= 1770 in architecture =

The year 1770 in architecture involved some significant events.

== Buildings and structures ==
=== Buildings ===
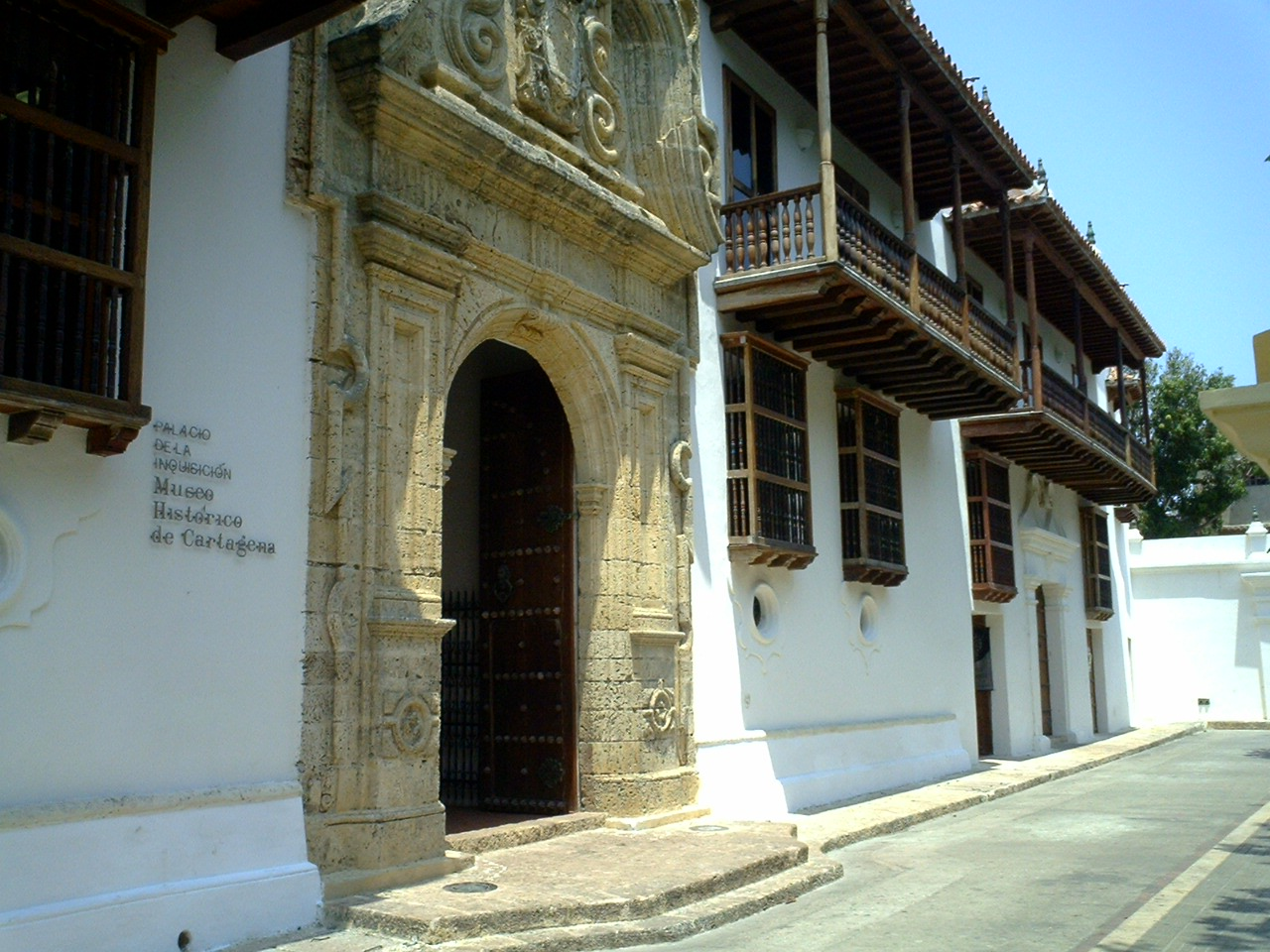
Palace of Inquisition, Cartagena

- Radcliffe Infirmary in Oxford, England, designed by Stiff Leadbetter and John Sanderson, completed
- Shire Hall, Nottingham, England, designed by James Gandon and Joseph Pickford, completed
- New National Mint of Bolivia in Potosí completed
- Palace of Inquisition in Cartagena, Viceroyalty of New Granada, completed about this date
- Liria Palace in Madrid, designed by Ventura Rodríguez, built about this date
- Church of Our Lady of Mount Carmel, Rio de Janeiro, Brazil, probably designed by Manuel Alves Setúbal, consecrated
- Church of Santissimo Nome di Maria e degli Angeli Custodi, Genoa, begun in 1712, completed about this date
- Church of La Magdalena, Getafe, Spain, designed by Alonso de Covarrubias and Juan Gómez de Mora and begun in the 16th century, completed
- Wooden Saint Parascheva Church, Desești, Romania, built
- New Théâtre du Palais-Royal (rue Saint-Honoré), Paris, designed by Pierre-Louis Moreau-Desproux, opened
- New L'Opéra of the Palace of Versailles, France, designed by Ange-Jacques Gabriel, opened
- College Edifice, Brown University, Providence, Rhode Island, designed by Robert Smith of Philadelphia, built
- Somerset House, Park Lane, London, designed and built by John Phillips, completed
- Zois Mansion in Ljubljana, Slovenia, completed
- Summer residences in the Frederiksberg district of Copenhagen, Denmark, built about this date include
  - Rolighed
  - Store Godthåb, probably designed by Johan Christian Conradi
- Temple of Friendship in Sanssouci Park, Potsdam, Prussia, designed by Carl von Gontard, completed
- The Eryilou Fujian tulou in China is built
- Approximate date – Mesi Bridge in Ottoman Albania built

== Births ==
- March 4 – Christian Zais, German architect and city planner (died 1820)
- 1765/1770 – Fryderyk Bauman, Polish architect and sculptor-decorator (died 1845)
- Approximate date – Daniel Robertson, American-born British architect and garden designer (died 1849)

== Deaths ==
- March 27 – José Ramírez de Arellano, Spanish baroque architect and sculptor (born 1705)
- John Bastard, English architect working in Blandford Forum (born c.1688)
- George Tully, English architect working in Bristol
