= San Lazzaro =

San Lazzaro may refer to:

- San Lazzaro degli Armeni, a small island in the Venetian Lagoon
- San Lazzaro di Savena, an Italian comune in the Metropolitan City of Bologna, Emilia-Romagna

== Churches ==
- San Lazzaro dei Mendicanti
- San Lazzaro, Modena
- San Lazzaro, Pavia
- San Lazzaro, Sarzana

== See also ==
- Lazzaro (disambiguation)
- San Lazaro (disambiguation)
