= Marano =

Marano may refer to:

== Places ==
=== Municipalities ===
- Marano di Napoli, in the Province of Naples, Campania
- Marano di Valpolicella, in the Province of Verona, Veneto
- Marano Equo, in the Province of Rome, Lazio
- Marano Lagunare, in the Province of Udine, Friuli-Venezia Giulia
- Marano Marchesato, in the Province of Cosenza, Calabria
- Marano Principato, in the Province of Cosenza, Calabria
- Marano sul Panaro, in the Province of Modena, Emilia-Romagna
- Marano Ticino, in the Province of Novara, Piedmont
- Marano Vicentino, in the Province of Vicenza, Veneto

=== Hamlets ===
- Marano (Castenaso), in the municipality of Castenaso (BO), Emilia-Romagna
- Marano (Isera), in the municipality of Isera (TN), Trentino-South Tyrol
- Marano (Parma), in the municipality of Parma, Emilia-Romagna
- Marano Veneziano, in the municipality of Mira, Veneto

=== Rivers of Italy and San Marino ===
- Marano (river), in Emilia–Romagna and San Marino
- Marano di Reno, in Emilia-Romagna

== See also ==
- Marana (disambiguation)
- Marano (surname), a surname of Italian origin
- Merano (disambiguation)
- Marrano, an ancient term referring to Jews living in the Iberian Peninsula
- Marani (disambiguation)
- Mirano, town in Veneto
- Morano (disambiguation)
- Murano (disambiguation)
