= Merano (disambiguation) =

Merano (German Meran) is a spa city and comune in South Tyrol, northern Italy.

Merano may also refer to:

Surname

- Francesco Merano (1619–1657) Italian painter
- Giovanni Battista Merano (1632-1698) Italian painter
- Michelangelo Merano (1867–?) Italian painter

Sport

- HC Merano, ice hockey team
- Merano Cup, figure skating competition
- Merano Open, tennis tournament
- Gran Premio Merano, horse race

Other

- "Merano", choral piece from Chess (musical)

== Similar spellings ==
- Marano (disambiguation)
- Murano (disambiguation)
- Meran (disambiguation)
