= Camogli Molo Esterno Lighthouse =

Lighthouse in Liguria, Italy

Camogli Molo Esterno
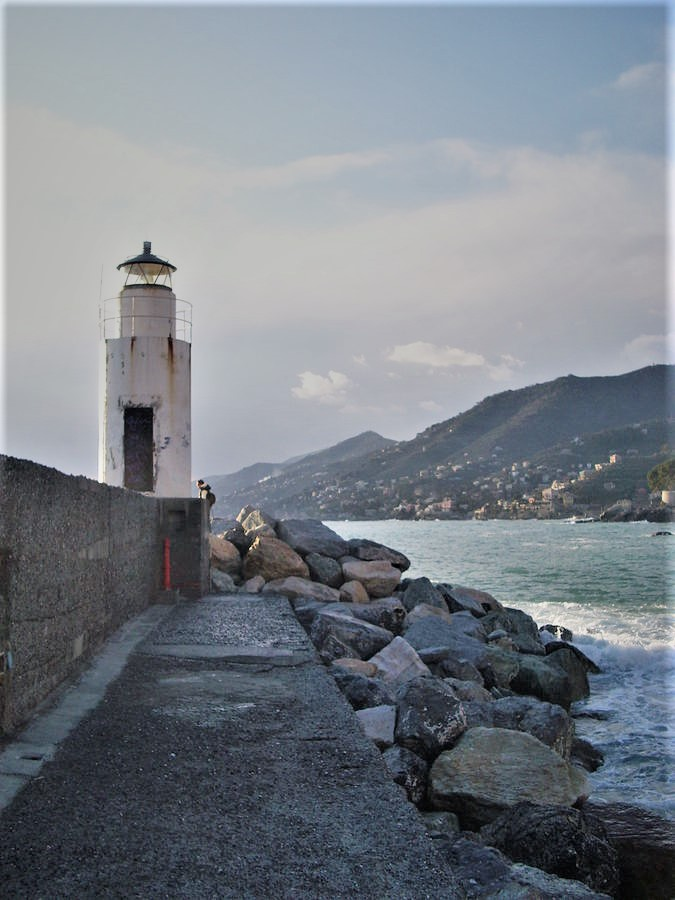
- Camogli Molo Esterno Lighthouse
- Location: Camogli; Liguria; Italy
- Coordinates: 44°21′06″N 9°08′57″E

Tower
- Constructed: 1950
- Foundation: concrete base
- Construction: concrete tower
- Automated: yes
- Height: 5 metres (16 ft)
- Shape: cylindrical tower with balcony and lantern
- Markings: white tower, grey metallic lantern dome
- Power source: solar power
- Operator: Marina Militare

Light
- First lit: 1950
- Focal height: 11 metres (36 ft)
- Lens: Type TD
- Intensity: MaxiHalo-60
- Range: 9 nautical miles (17 km; 10 mi)
- Characteristic: Fl W 3s.
- Italy no.: 1671 E.F.

Camogli Molo Esterno Lighthouse (Italian: Faro di Camogli Molo Esterno) is an active lighthouse located at the end of the external breakwater of the harbour of Camogli, Liguria on the Ligurian Sea.

== Description ==
The first lighthouse was a metal post with a light on the top; then a lighthouse was built in 1950 and consists of a white concrete cylindrical tower, 5 feet (1.5 m) high, with balcony and lantern, placed at the end of the external breakwater. The lantern, painted in white and the dome in grey metallic, is positioned at 11 metres (36 ft) above sea level and emits one white flash in a 3 seconds period, visible up to a distance of 9 nautical miles (17 km; 10 mi). The lighthouse was damaged several times from the fury of the sea but was always rebuilt; in the night of December 16, 2011 a furious tempest took away the lantern that was lost. The lighthouse is powered by a solar unit, is completely automated and operated by the Marina Militare with the identification code number 1671 E.F.

== See also ==
- List of lighthouses in Italy
- Camogli
