= Murano (disambiguation) =

Murano is a series of islands linked by bridges in the Venetian Lagoon, northern Italy.

Murano may also refer to:

- Nissan Murano, an automobile
- Murano (restaurant), a restaurant in Mayfair, London, England
- Murano (skyscraper), a skyscraper in Center City, Philadelphia, Pennsylvania, United States
- Murano, Toronto, a skyscraper in Toronto, Ontario, Canada
- Murano (surname)
- Murano Station, a railway station in Hirakata, Osaka Prefecture, Japan
- Murano glass

== Similar spelling ==
- Marano (disambiguation)
- Merano (disambiguation)
