= Zerbi =

Zerbi is a surname. Notable people with the surname include:

- Gabriele Zerbi (1445–1505), Italian physician and professor
- Giovanni Vincenzo Zerbi, 17th-century Italian painter
- Tranquillo Zerbi (1891–1939), Italian engineer
