= 1712 in architecture =

The year 1712 in architecture involved some significant events.

== Buildings and structures ==
=== Buildings ===
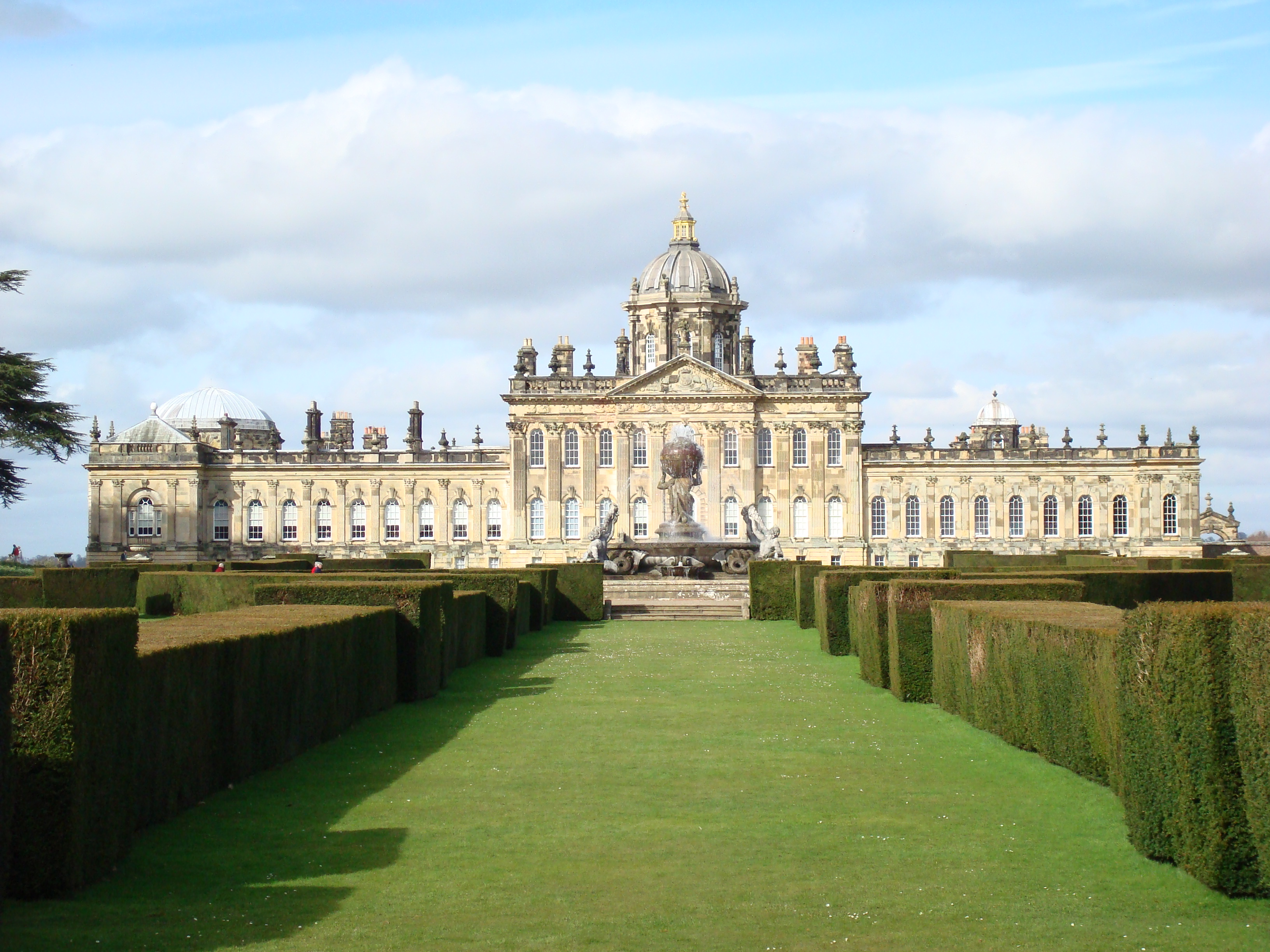
Castle Howard

- Castle Howard in Yorkshire, England (begun 1699), designed by Sir John Vanbrugh and Nicholas Hawksmoor, is completed.
- Roehampton House in Roehampton, London, England, designed by Thomas Archer is completed.
- Palais Trautson in Vienna is built.
- St Alkmund's Church, Whitchurch, Shropshire, England, designed by John Barker, is consecrated.
- Construction of church of Santissimo Nome di Maria e degli Angeli Custodi, Genoa, begins (completed c.1770).

== Births ==
- November 7 – Antoine Choquet de Lindu, French architect and military engineer (died 1790)

== Deaths ==
- October 27 – Sir William Robinson, English architect, worked in Ireland (born 1645)
