= Lazarou =

Lazarou may refer to:

- Lefteris Lazarou (born 1952), Greek chef
- Maria Lazarou (born 1972), Greek football player
- Papa Lazarou, a character from BBC TV's The League of Gentlemen

== See also ==
- Lazzaro (disambiguation)
- Lazarus (disambiguation)
