= San Lazaro =

San Lazaro may refer to:

- St. Lazarus:
  - Lazarus of Bethany, a figure in the Gospel of John, which describes him being raised by Jesus from the dead
  - Rich man and Lazarus, a story spoken by Jesus and unrelated to the Lazarus "raised from the dead"
  - Lazarus of Persia (died 326), Persian martyr
  - Lazarus Zographos (died 867), Christian saint
  - Order of Saint Lazarus, a religious/military order which picked Lazarus as their patron saint
  - St. Lazarus Parish, a parish in Macau
  - Tomb of Lazarus (al-Eizariya), near which is the Church of Saint Lazarus

== Places ==
- San Lazaro archaeological site in the U.S. state of New Mexico
- San Lázaro town in the Concepción department of Paraguay
- San Lazaro Tourism and Business Park in Manila, Philippines
- San Lazzaro Island in Venice, Italy
- San Lazzaro di Savena, a municipality in the Province of Bologna, Italy
- San Lazzaro, Sarzana, parish church and neighborhood near Sarzana, Italy
- San Lazzaro, Modena, church in Modena, Italy

=== Mexico City ===
- Palacio Legislativo de San Lázaro, seat of the Chamber of Deputies
- Metro San Lázaro, a station on the Mexico City metro

== Films ==
- San Lazaro (film), a 2011 Filipino horror film directed by Wincy Aquino Ong
