= Giovanni Battista Merano =

Italian painter (1632–1698)

- Born: 1632; Genoa, Republic of Genoa
- Died: 1698 (65–66)
- Known for: Painting
- Movement: Baroque

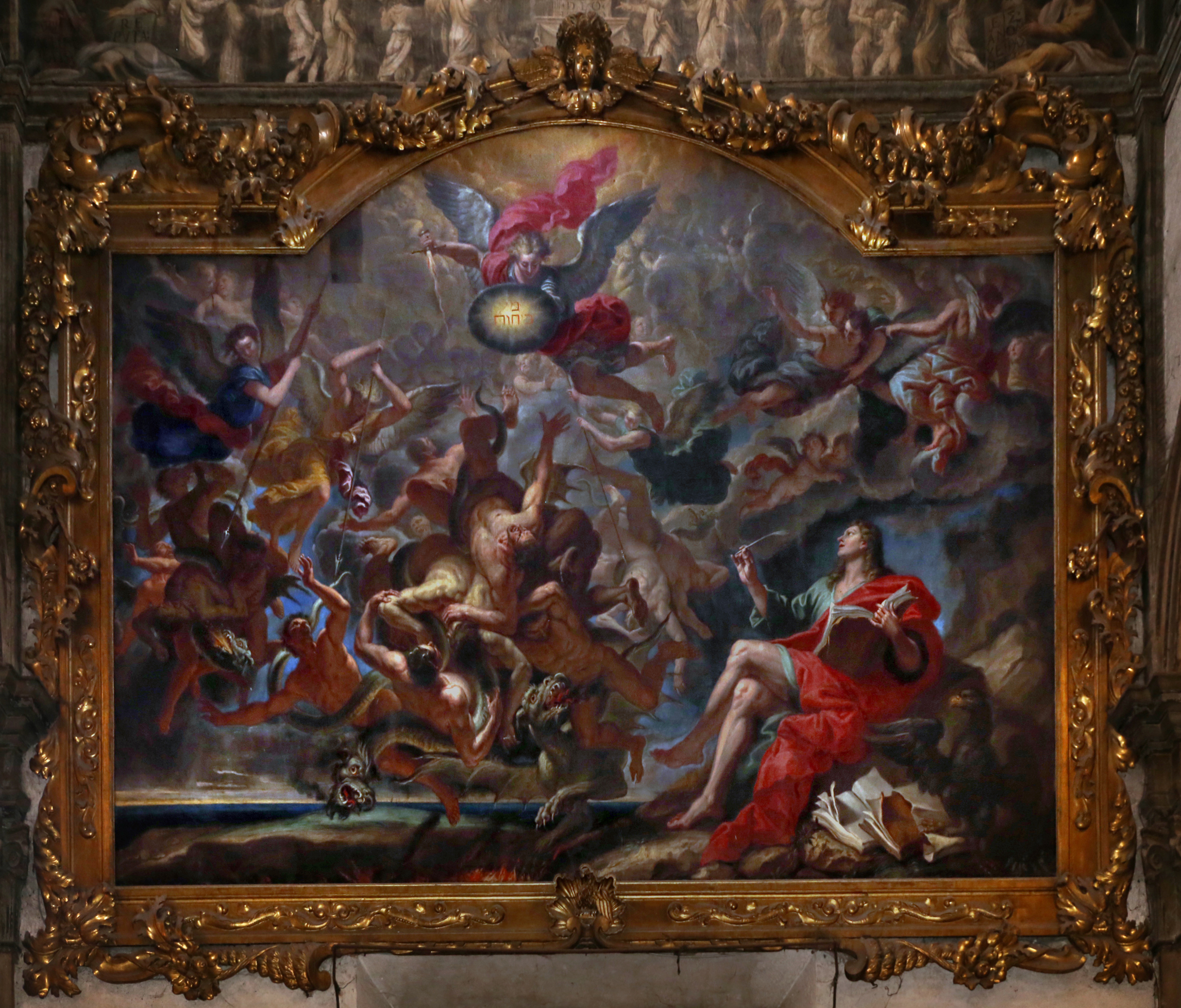
Fresco in San Giovanni Evangelista in Parma, 1687

Giovanni Battista Merano (1632–1698) was an Italian painter of the Baroque period, mainly active in Genoa.

== Biography ==
Merano was born in Genoa, Republic of Genoa. He was one of the pupils of Valerio Castello. He spent some years in Parma, returning after the death of Castello, and painted in various churches. He returned to Parma in 1668, where he soon obtained a pension from the Duke Ranuccio II.

Giovanni Battista Merano appears unrelated to Francesco Merano.

In 1698, he painted in the town of San Remo. Among his disciples were Giovanni Battista Resoaggi and Davide Campi.

== Works ==
- Painted the chapel in the Ducal Palace of Colorno.
- Frescoes for the chapels of the church of San Giovanni Evangelista in Parma belonging to the Benedictines.
