= Murano (surname) =

Murano is an Italian surname. Notable people with the surname include:

- Andrea da Murano, Italian painter
- Elsa Murano (born 1959), American university president
- Jacopo Murano (born 1991), Italian footballer
- Maria Murano (1918–2009), French opera singer
- Nadalino da Murano, Italian painter
- Yiya Murano (1930–2014), Argentine murderer

Murano (written: 村野 or 邑野) is also a Japanese surname. Notable people with the surname include:

- Masao Murano (村野 正夫, born 1935), Japanese ice hockey player
- Mia Murano (邑野 未亜, born 1986), Japanese model and actress
- Tetsutaro Murano (村野 鉄太郎, born 1929), Japanese film director
- Togo Murano (村野 藤吾, 1891–1984), Japanese architect
