= Angelica Veronica Airola =

Italian artist (c. 1590–1670)

Angelica or Angiola Veronica Airola (c. 1590 – 1670) was an Italian painter of the Baroque period, active mainly in 17th century Genoa. She was a pupil of the painter Domenico Fiasella. She became a nun of the order of San Bartolommeo dell' Oliveta at Genoa. She painted several works, mainly religious, while in the convent.
