= Francesco Capurro =

Italian painter

Francesco Capurro, also known as Capuro, was a 17th-century Italian painter of the Baroque period, mainly active in Genoa and Modena. He was born in Camogli, south east of Genoa. He was one of the main pupils of the genoese Domenico Fiasella. During a trip to Rome, he was apparently influenced by the Caravaggisti painter from Naples, Jusepe Ribera. He was employed some time at the Court of Modena, and died young at Genoa, of a malignant fever.
