= Santissimo Nome di Maria e degli Angeli Custodi, Genoa =

Baroque church in Genoa, Italy

Coordinates: 44.408333°N 8.930556°E

Church of the Most Holy Name of Mary and the Guardian Angels
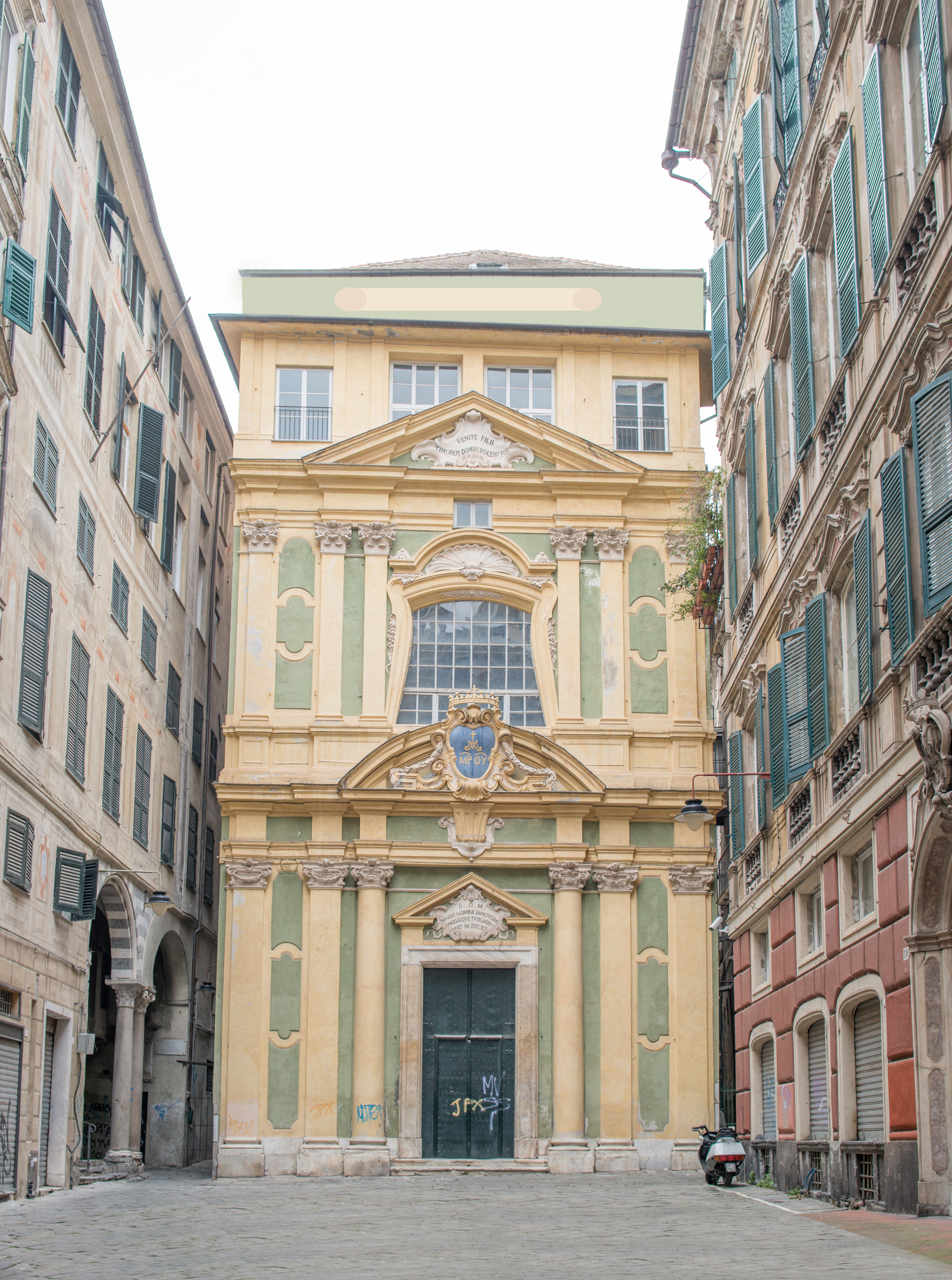
- The façade
- Church of the Most Holy Name of Mary and the Guardian Angels
- Location: Genoa
- Country: Italy
- Denomination: Catholic Church

Architecture
- Architectural type: Baroque
- Groundbreaking: 1712
- Completed: 18th century

The Church of the Most Holy Name of Mary and the Guardian Angels, commonly known as the Church of the Scuole Pie, is a place of worship located in Piazza delle Scuole Pie, in the historic center of Genoa, a few dozen meters from the Cathedral of San Lorenzo.

== History ==
The church was built, partly using a pre-existing building, by the community of the Poor Clerics Regular of the Mother of God of the Pious Schools, present in the city since the early 17th century and coming from Savona, who also built a school in the square. Construction work began in 1712, but was completed only around 1770.

After the expropriation of monasteries and convents decided by the Ligurian Republic, the Scolopi fathers transferred the school to the former Benedictine monastery located in the Piano di Sant'Andrea, while keeping the church active.

During restoration work on the church, which took place in the second half of the 1980s, archaeological remains from both the Republican Roman era and later periods came to light.

The square where the building is located had been for some centuries (the first testimonies date back to 1277) the residence area of the Cicala noble family, probable original owners of the building used as a base for the construction of the church. In previous centuries, the family had also built two buildings nearby, later included in the Rolli list, now known as Palazzo Cicala-Raggio and Palazzo Gio Andrea Cicala.

== Description ==
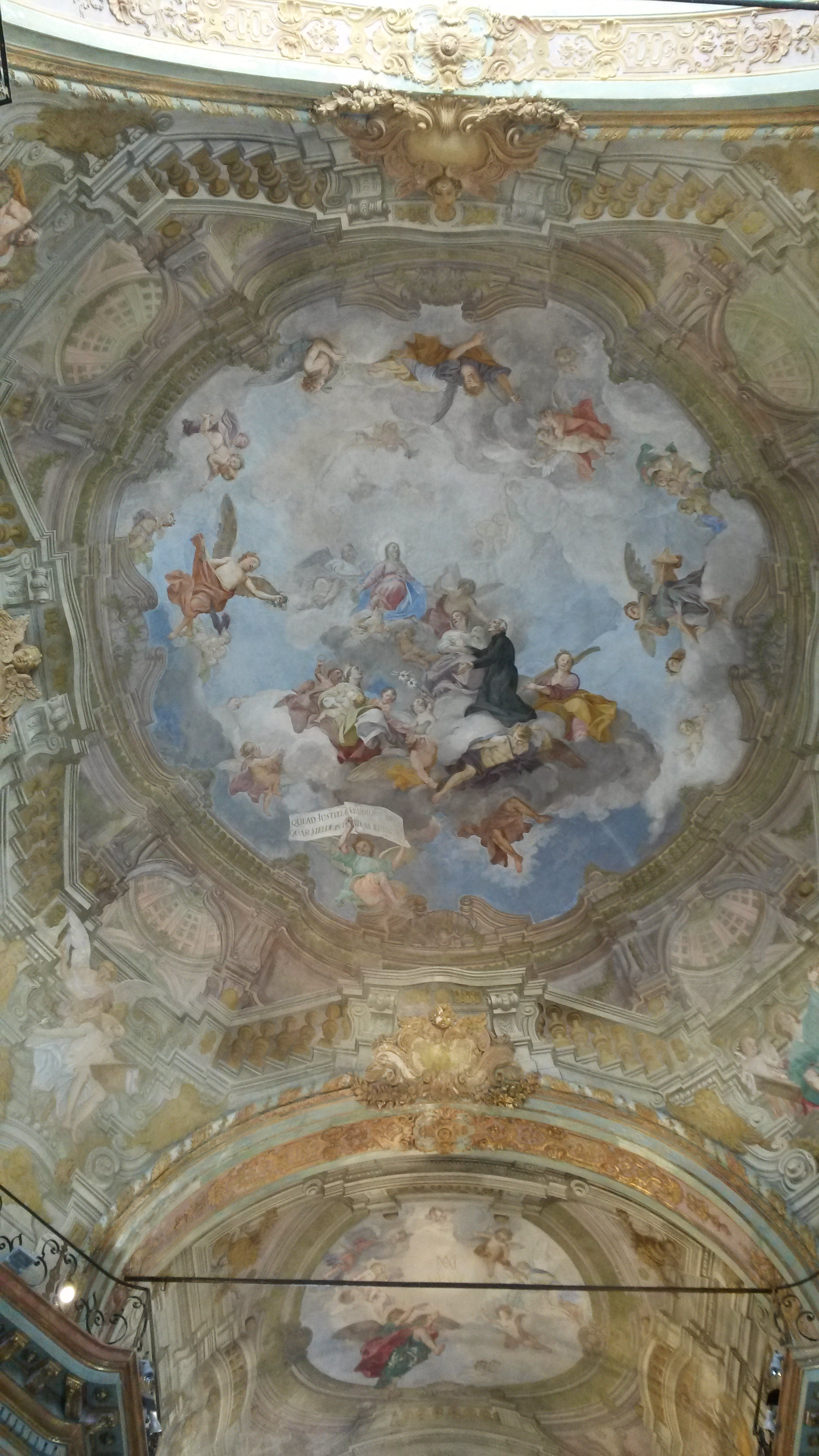
Frescoes on the vault by Galeotti

The church is one of the best examples of late-Baroque architecture in Genoa.

The facade, with a double order of half-columns and pilasters, ends with a triangular pediment, above which an elevation housed the Scolopi college. In the center of the facade opens a large window framed by stucco.

Giuseppe Galeotti (1709–1778) and Andrea Leoncini created several works inside the church, including the frescoes representing Joseph Calasanz, founder of the Scolopi order. On the sail vault of the single octagonal nave, Leoncini is the author of the architectural quadratures while Galeotti celebrated in fresco the Glory of the Virgin and Saint Joseph Calasanz, while at the back, in the barrel vault above the altar, the same artist frescoed the Exaltation of the Name of Mary. Galeotti also created four paintings, placed on as many pillars of the church, representing the saints Jerome, Ambrose, Gregory, and Augustine of Hippo.

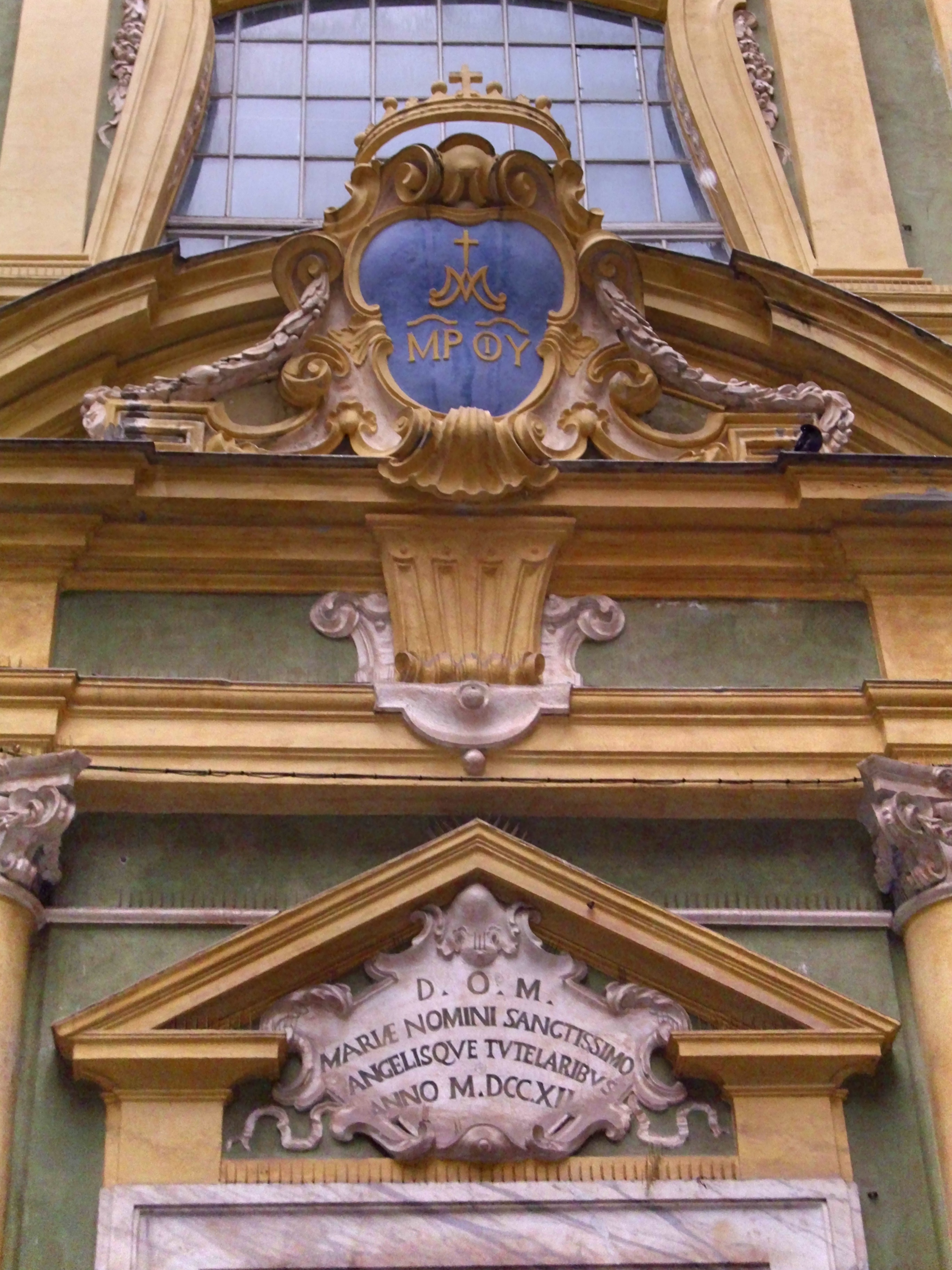
Detail of the facade above the entrance of the building

Francesco Maria Schiaffino designed nine bas-reliefs present in the church, with episodes from the Life of the Virgin, but having died during the execution of the work (in 1765), the remaining ones were made, based on Schiaffino's drawings, by his students. Considered works directly by the sculptor are the three representing the Nativity, the Purification, and the Dispute of Jesus in the Temple, while works by his students are the Marriage of the Virgin, the Annunciation, the Visitation, the Death of Our Lady, the Pentecost, and the Flight into Egypt (the latter perhaps an early work by Nicolò Traverso).

The statue of the Madonna and Child placed on the high altar is attributed to Tommaso Orsolino or to Francesco Fanelli, while a pictorial representation of the guardian angel is a work by Giovanni Paolo Oderico.

In 1980, from the unguarded church, the two canvases placed on the side altars were stolen, depicting Saint Calasanz (by Jacopo Cestaro, student of Solimena) and the Guardian Angel (by Gian Paolo Oderico, follower of Fiasella). The latter was recovered in 2010 by the Carabinieri Cultural Heritage Protection Unit and restored with ministerial funds. In place of the first canvas, a green cloth is hung.

Under the floor level is a crypt where the religious were buried.

== See also ==
- Historic center of Genoa

== Bibliography ==
- Federico Alizeri, Guida artistica per la città di Genova [Artistic guide to the city of Genoa] (in Italian), printed by Gio. Grondona q. Giuseppe, 1846
- Piera Melli, Intervento di emergenza nella chiesa delle Scuole Pie [Emergency intervention in the church of Scuole Pie] (in Italian), in edited by Piera Melli Archeologia in Liguria III 2 Scavi e scoperte 1982–86 [] (in Italian), Genova, Sovraintendenza archeologica della Liguria, 1990
- Piera Melli, Scuole Pie. Lo scavo [Scuole Pie. The excavation], edited by Piera Melli, in La città ritrovata, Archeologia urbana a Genova 1984–1994 [The rediscovered city, Urban archaeology in Genoa 1984–1994] (in Italian), Tormena Editore, 1996, ISBN 88-86017-62-6, pp. 283–289
- Riccardo Navone, Viaggio nei caruggi. Edicole votive, pietre e portali [Journey through the alleyways. Votive shrines, stones, and portals] (in Italian), Fratelli Frilli Editori, Genova, 2007 ISBN 978-88-7563-334-9
