= Meran (disambiguation) =

Meran (Italian Merano) is a spa city and comune in South Tyrol, northern Italy.

Meran may also refer to:

- Duchy of Merania or Meran, Adriatic fiefdom of the Holy Roman Empire from 1152 until 1248
- Franz, Count of Meran (1839–1891), Austrian noble, and his heirs
- Marcel Meran, French sailor at the 1900 Olympics
- Meran Variation, chess Semi-Slav Defense variation

== See also ==
- Merano (disambiguation)
- Lake Meran, Victoria, Australia
