= Luca Saltarello =

Italian painter (c.1610–1645)

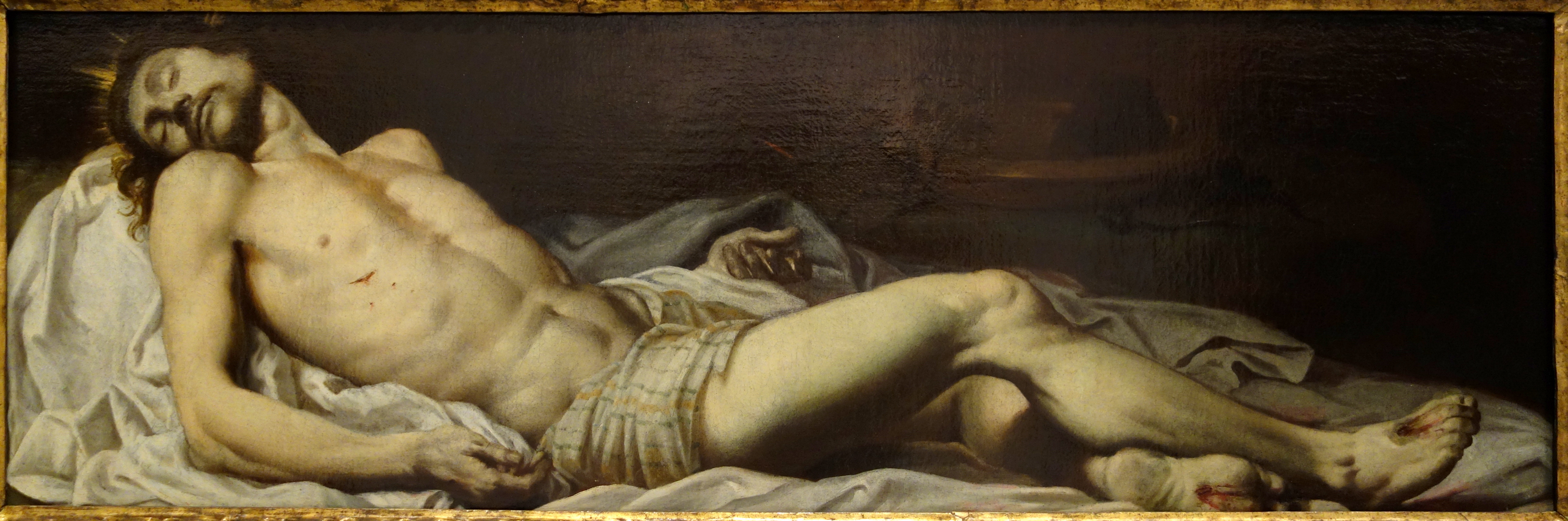
The dead Christ

Luca Saltarello (c. 1610 – c. 1645) was an Italian Baroque painter known for his religious compositions. After training in Genoa he worked the rest of his short life in Rome.

== Life ==
Little is known about the background of this artist who was born in Genoa around 1610. He trained with Domenico Fiasella. From the mid-1630s, he was working in Rome where he later died.

His early death has been attributed to his slavish dedication to his work.

== Work ==
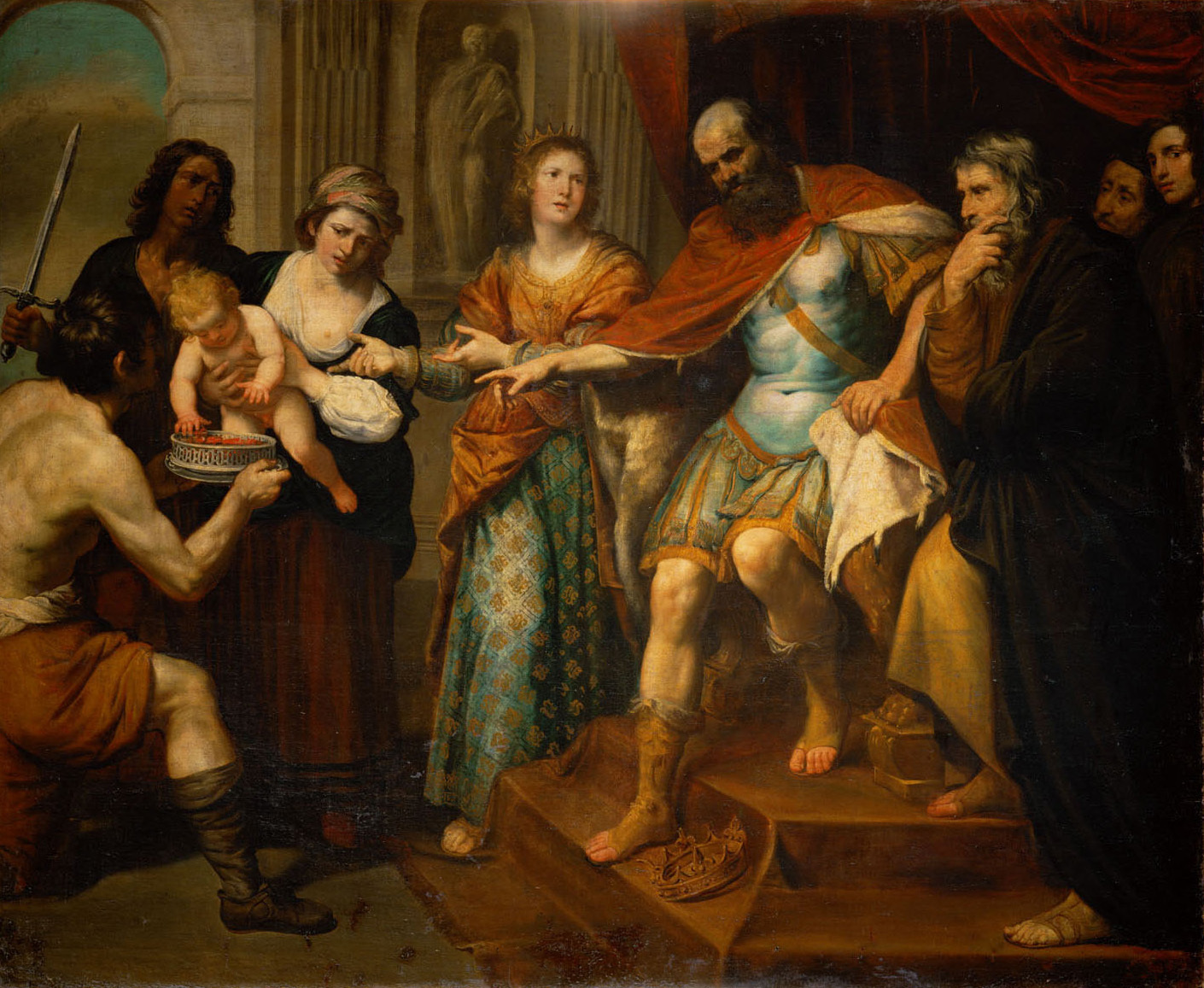
The ordeal of the young Moses

Only a small body of work consisting of religious compositions is currently ascribed to Luca Saltarello. It has been difficult to define the scope of work to be attributed to the artist as only one securely documented work by the artist is known, a large altarpiece representing Saint Benedict Reviving a Fallen Worker, which was painted for the Chiesa di Santo Stefano in Genoa in 1632. Various of his works were in the past attributed to his master Fiasella of whom he was the most accomplished pupil.

In his early work, Saltarello used thick paint layers as did his master Fiasella with whom he worked in the late 1620s and early 1630s. In Genoa Saltarello also underwent the strong influence of various members of the Flemish artist community that had settled down there permanently or visited the city for long periods of time. In particular, the technique of Antony van Dyck was of important influence on his early work. This showed itself in a delicate style with less heavy strokes as those characteristic of his master' style. His style thus gained a greater freedom than that of Fiasella.

Other Flemish artists who influenced him included the landscape painter Jan Wildens who resided in Genoa around 1614 where he left many large landscapes. Saltarello's chromatic range was likely derived from other Flemish residents in Genoa in particular Jan Roos and the brothers Cornelis and Lucas de Wael.
