= Marana =

Marana may refer to:

- Maraña, a village in León, Spain
- Maraṇa, the Pali/Sanskrit term for death
- Marana, Arizona, a town in Pima County, Arizona, United States
- Marana, Estonia, a village in Estonia
- Marana, Syria, a village in Syria
- Uva Marana, a synonym of the Italian wine grape Verdicchio
- Marana Regional Airport, an airport in Arizona, United States

== See also ==
- Marano (disambiguation)
