= Lazzaro (disambiguation) =

Lazzaro , a masculine name from the Romance languages

Lazzaro may also refer to:

- Lazzaro (album), album by D'erlanger
- Lazzaro (producer), an Armenian record producer

== See also ==
- San Lazzaro (disambiguation)
