= Morano =

Morano may refer to:

== People ==
- Albert P. Morano (1908–1987), American politician
- Emma Morano (1899–2017), Italian supercentenarian
- Jacinto Morano (born 1984), Spanish lawyer and politician
- Juan Morano (1941–2018), Spanish politician
- Maddalena Caterina Morano (1847–1908), Italian beatified Roman Catholic nun
- Marc Morano (born 1968), American climate change denier and journalist
- Michael L. Morano (1915–2000), American politician
- Nadine Morano (born 1963), French politician
- Pellegrino Morano (1877–unknown), American mobster
- Reed Morano (born 1977), American cinematographer and director
- Sue Morano (born 1960), American politician

== Places ==
- Morano sul Po, a place in Alessandria, Italy
- Morano Calabro, a place in Cosenza, Italy

== Other uses ==
- Morano (publishing house)
