= Palace of the Inquisition (Cartagena, Colombia) =

- Palacio de la Inquisición
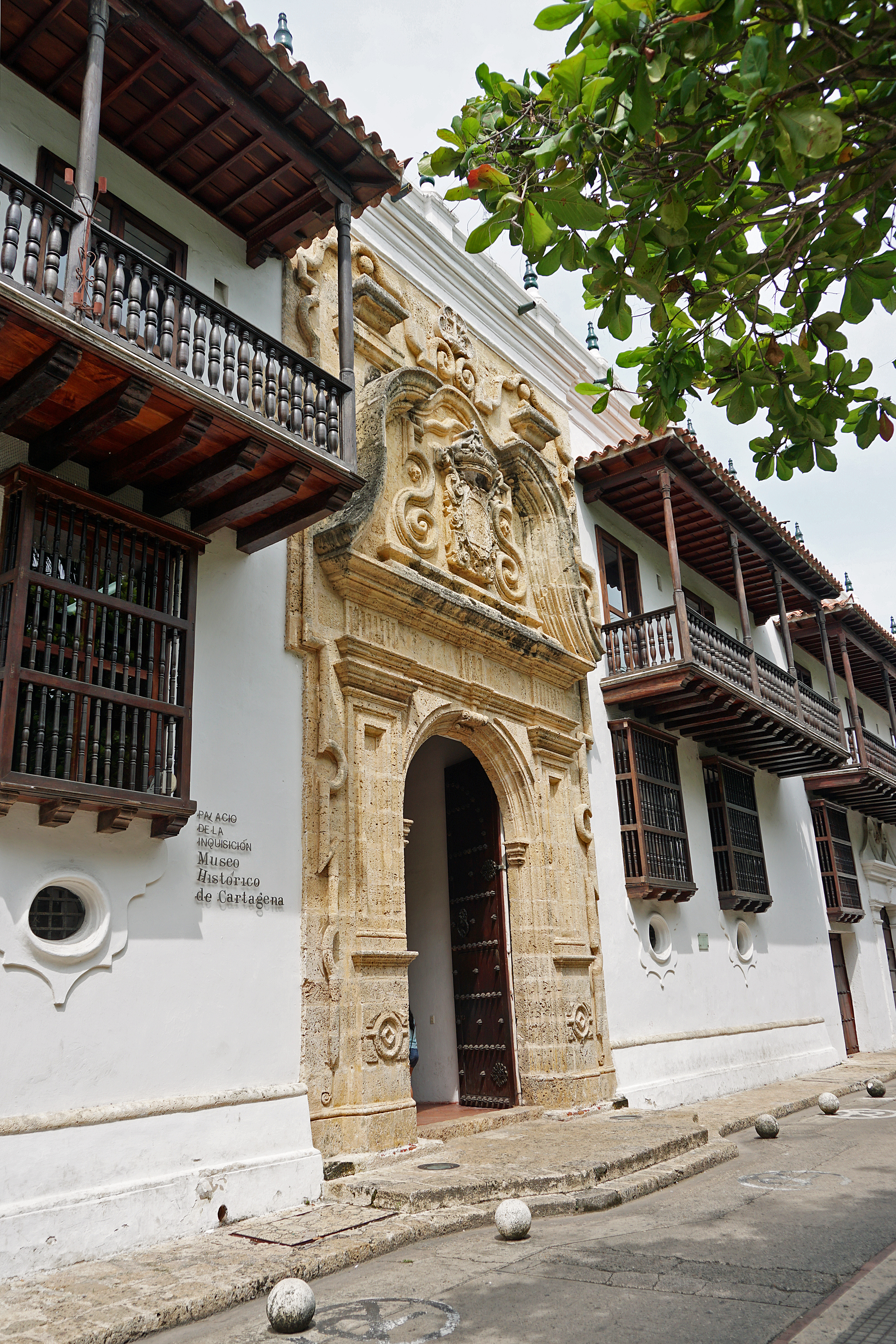
- Palace of the Inquisition
- Alternative names: Inquisition Palace

General information
- Architectural style: Spanish Colonial, Baroque
- Location: Cartagena, Colombia, Cartagena, Colombia
- Coordinates: 10°25′22.47″N 75°33′4.88″W
- Construction started: 1610
- Completed: 1770
- Owner: Colombian government

Technical details
- Floor count: 2

The Palace of the Inquisition, also known as the Inquisition Palace, (Spanish: Palacio de la Inquisición, Spanish pronunciation: [paˈlasjo ðe lajŋkisiˈsjon]) is an eighteenth-century seat of the Holy Office of the Inquisition in Cartagena, now in modern Colombia. Completed in 1770, the building now houses the Museo Histórico de Cartagena, which presents exhibits on the city’s colonial and republican past and on the operation of the Holy Office in Cartagena. Alongside information on trials, imprisonment and autos-da-fé, the museum shows alleged Inquisition torture devices; however, many of these items appear to be modern replicas or generic “medieval” reconstructions, and there is little evidence that they were actually used by the tribunal in Cartagena.

Some of the devices commonly associated with the Inquisition, such as the so‑called "iron maiden", are now considered nineteenth‑century inventions created for sensational exhibitions, rather than genuine instruments used by early modern tribunals. When similar objects appear in "Inquisition museums", they are generally regarded by historians as later fabrications rather than authentic Spanish Inquisition equipment.

== History ==
The establishment of the Palace was decreed by Philip III of Spain. Since Cartagena was a center of commerce, a transit point between the Caribbean and Spanish settlements in western South America, the city became the third in the Spanish empire to have a tribunal of the Holy Office of the Inquisition. Some merchants were Portuguese and suspected of being crypto-Jews (Jews passing as Christian). During the period 1580–1640, the crown of Portugal and that of Spain were ruled by the same monarch, and the period saw many Portuguese merchants active in Spain's overseas colonies. Established in 1610, the current building was completed much later. (Note: One source gives the date of completion as 1776, while another states 1770.) The tribunal operated for over two centuries until 1821, processing approximately 800 cases with only 3 to 5 executed.Despite its notorious reputation, only between 3 and 5 people were executed during this entire period, with most convicted individuals receiving sentences of flogging. The relatively low number of executions has led some historians to characterize the Cartagena tribunal as one of the more lenient inquisitorial courts of its era.

== Architecture ==
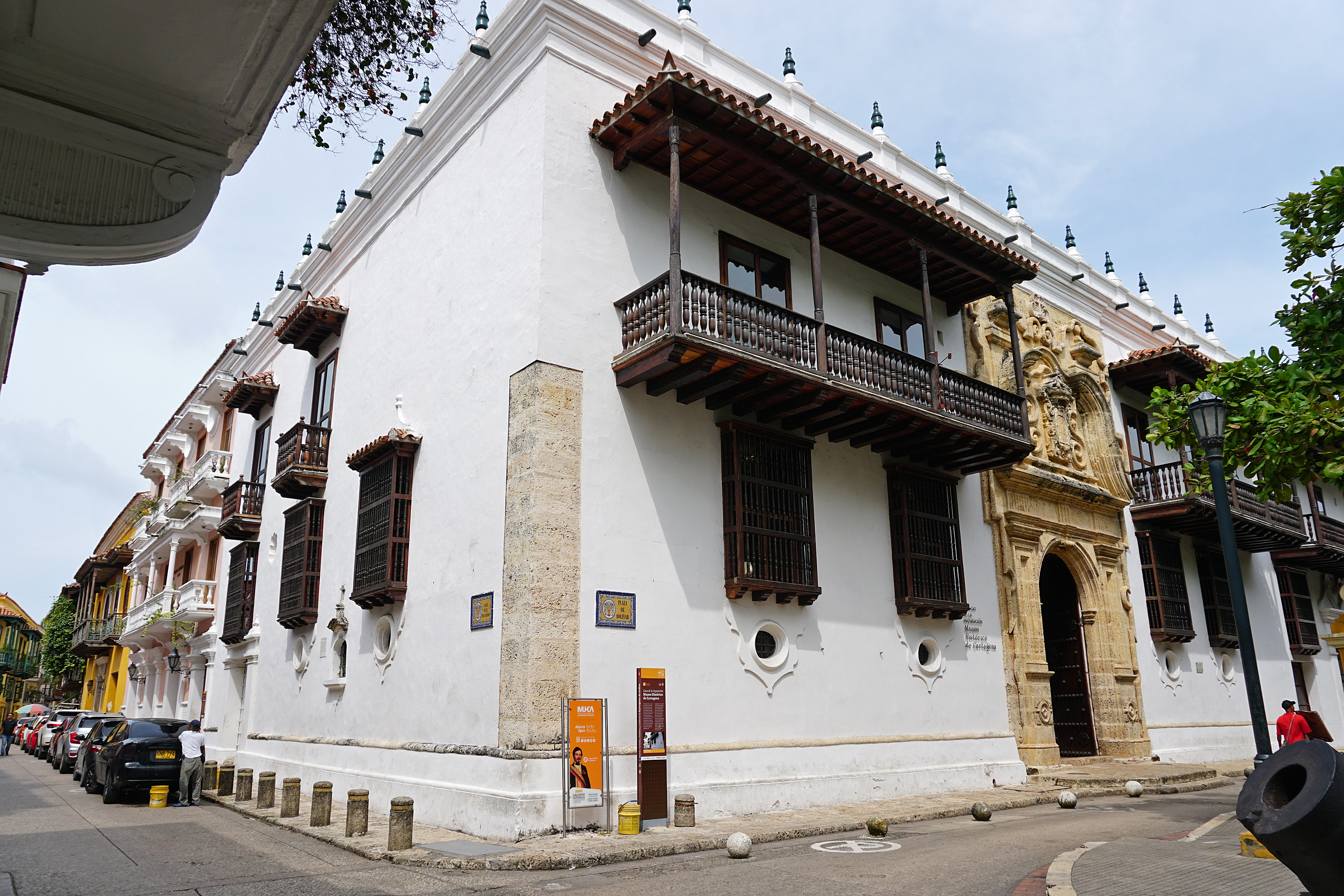
Facade

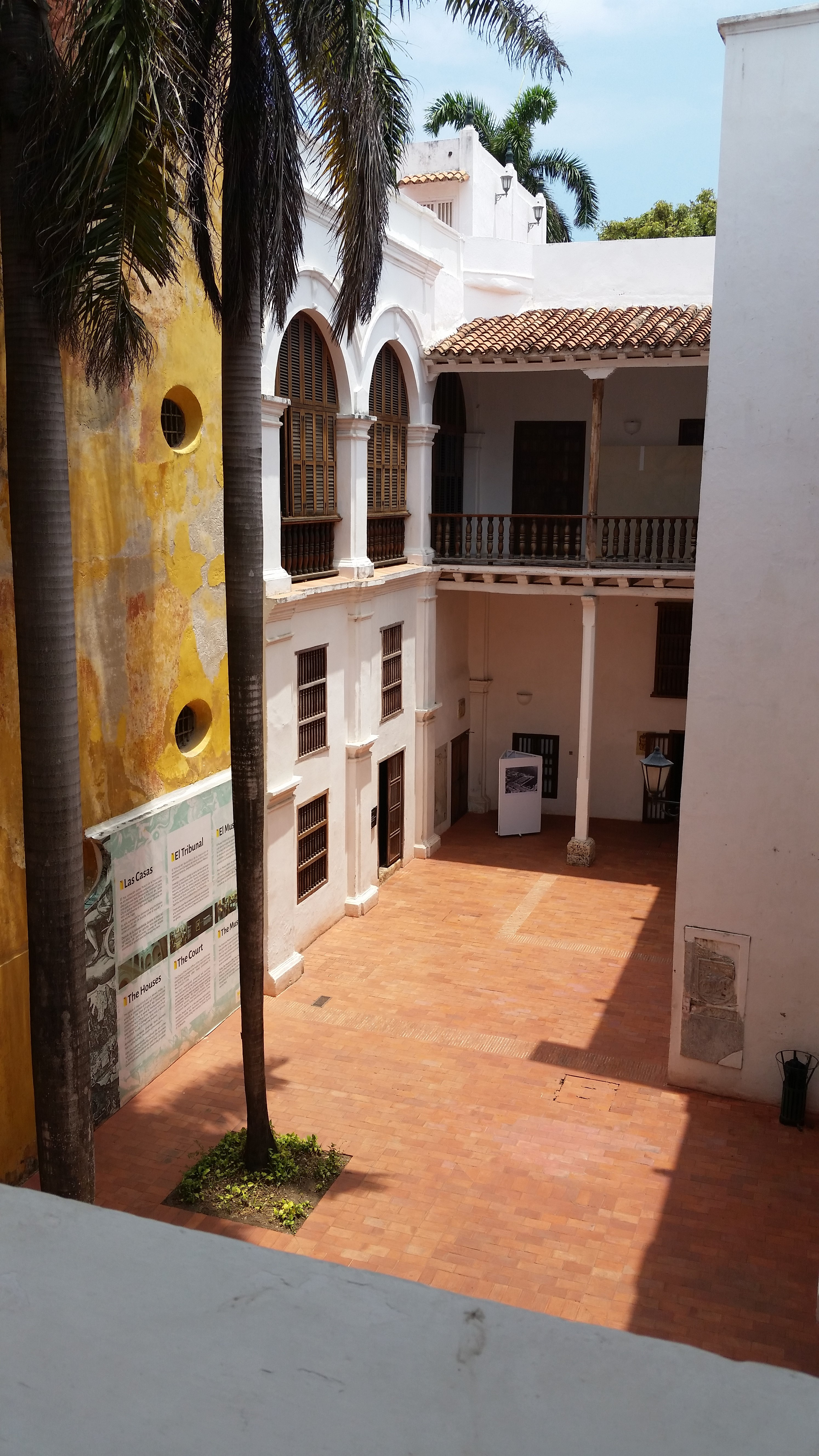
Palace of Inquisition interior

The Palace is built in Spanish Colonial style, with elements from the Baroque era. A crucifix occupies one of the walls facing a torture equipment. The white brick structure has gateways made of stone. The rooms of the Palace are mostly made up of masonry. The framework of the Palace is built out of wood; double-storey limestones were also used in the making of the Palace. The museum displays coins, maps, weapons, furniture, church bells, and depictions of notable generals, in addition to the torture equipment used previously. The Palace was partially restored to preserve Colombia's cultural heritage.

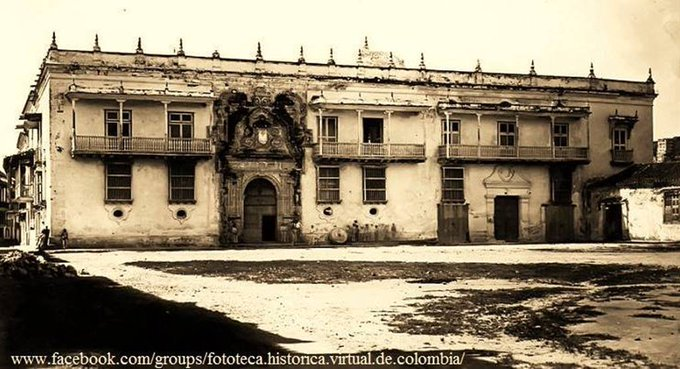
Palace of the Inquisition in 1875 (cleaned photo).

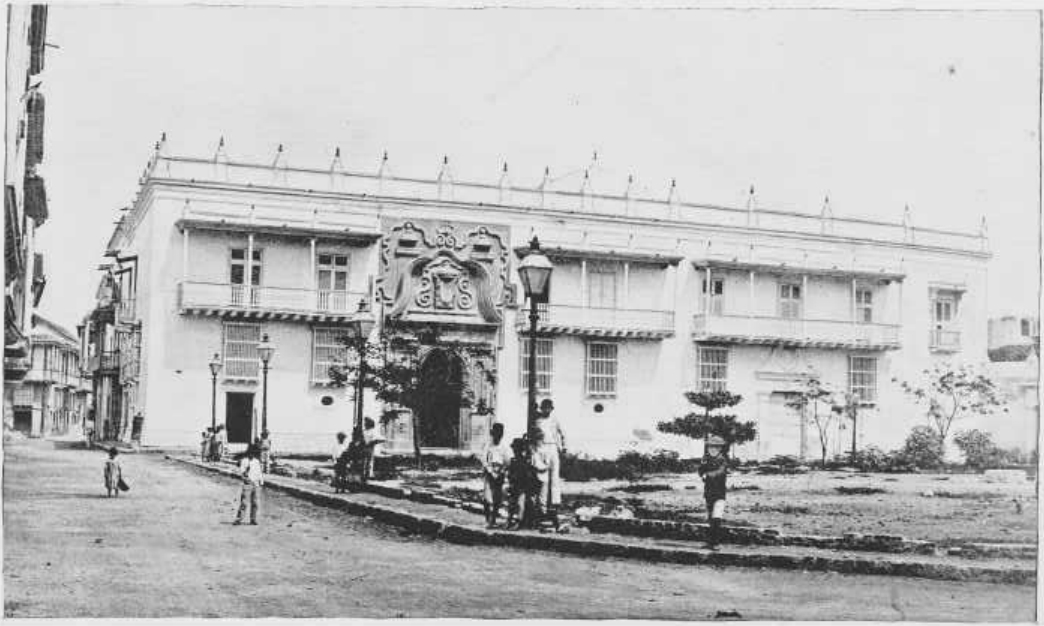
Palace of the Inquisition in 1893. Yale University Library.

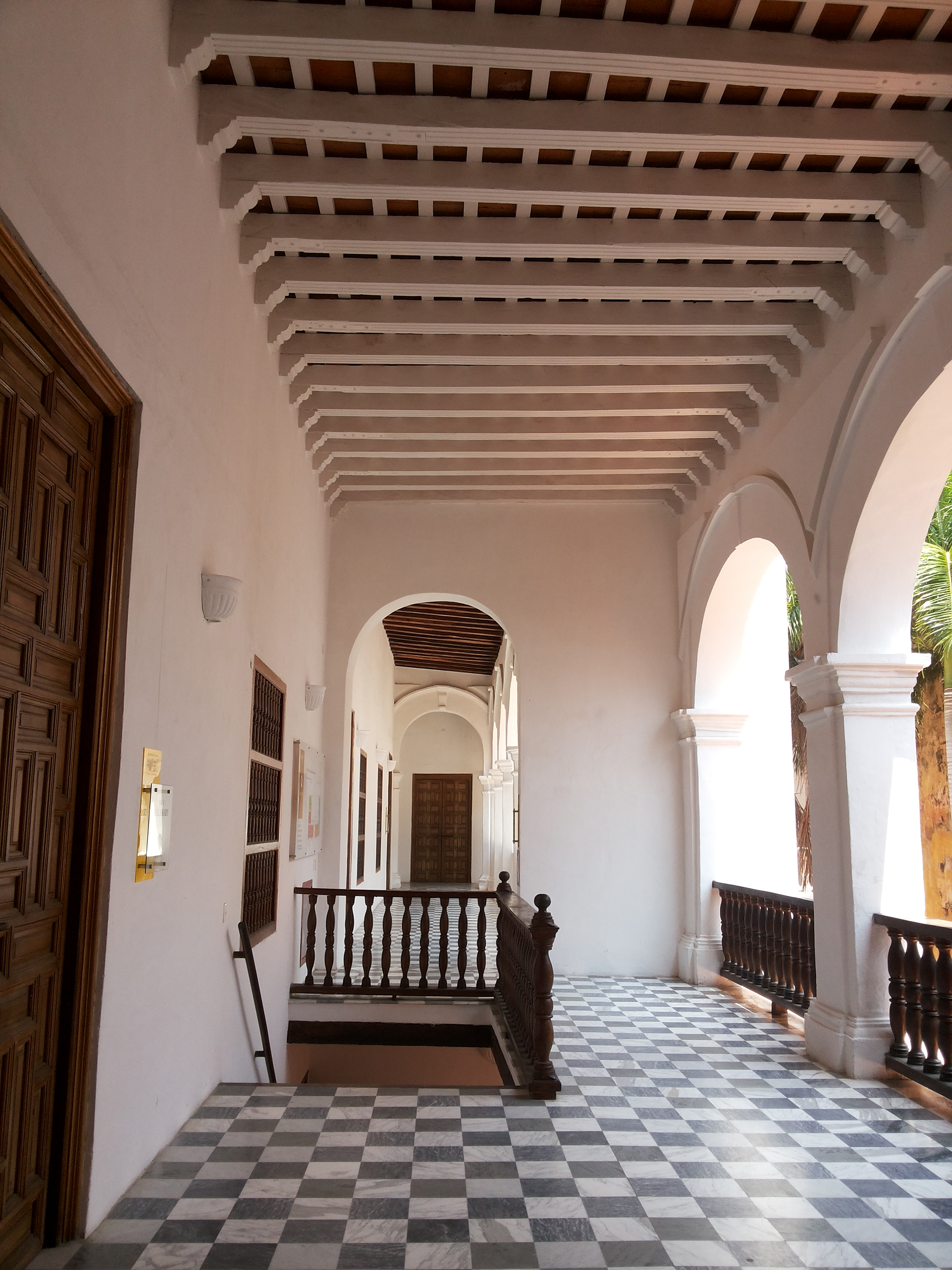
Colonial corridor

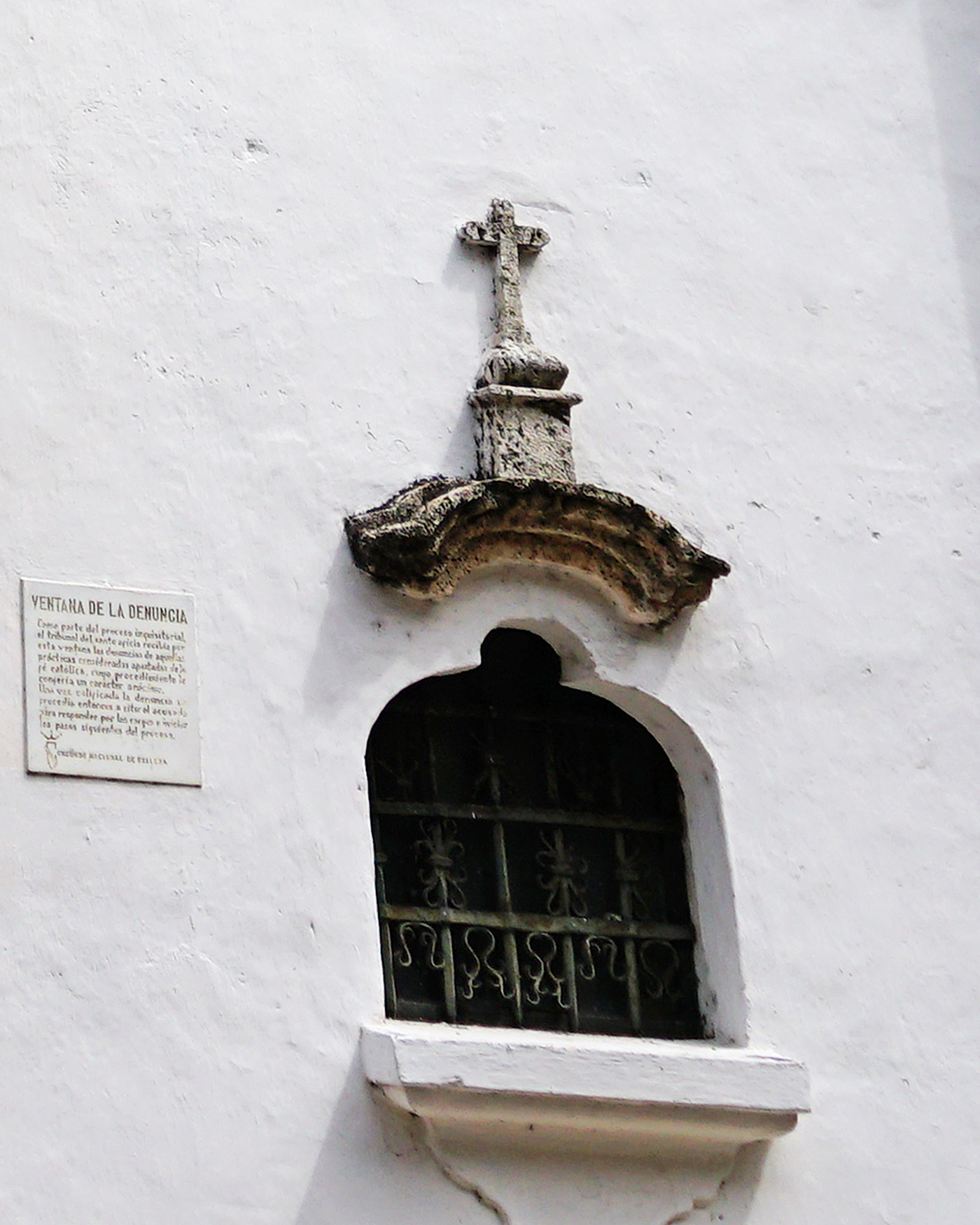
Anonymous Complaint Window

== See also ==
- List of colonial buildings in Cartagena, Colombia
- Mexican Inquisition
- Peruvian Inquisition
- Architecture of Colombia
