= Getafe Cathedral =

Catholic Cathedral in Getafe, Spain

- Cathedral of Saint Mary Magdalene
- Catedral de Santa Maria Magdalena
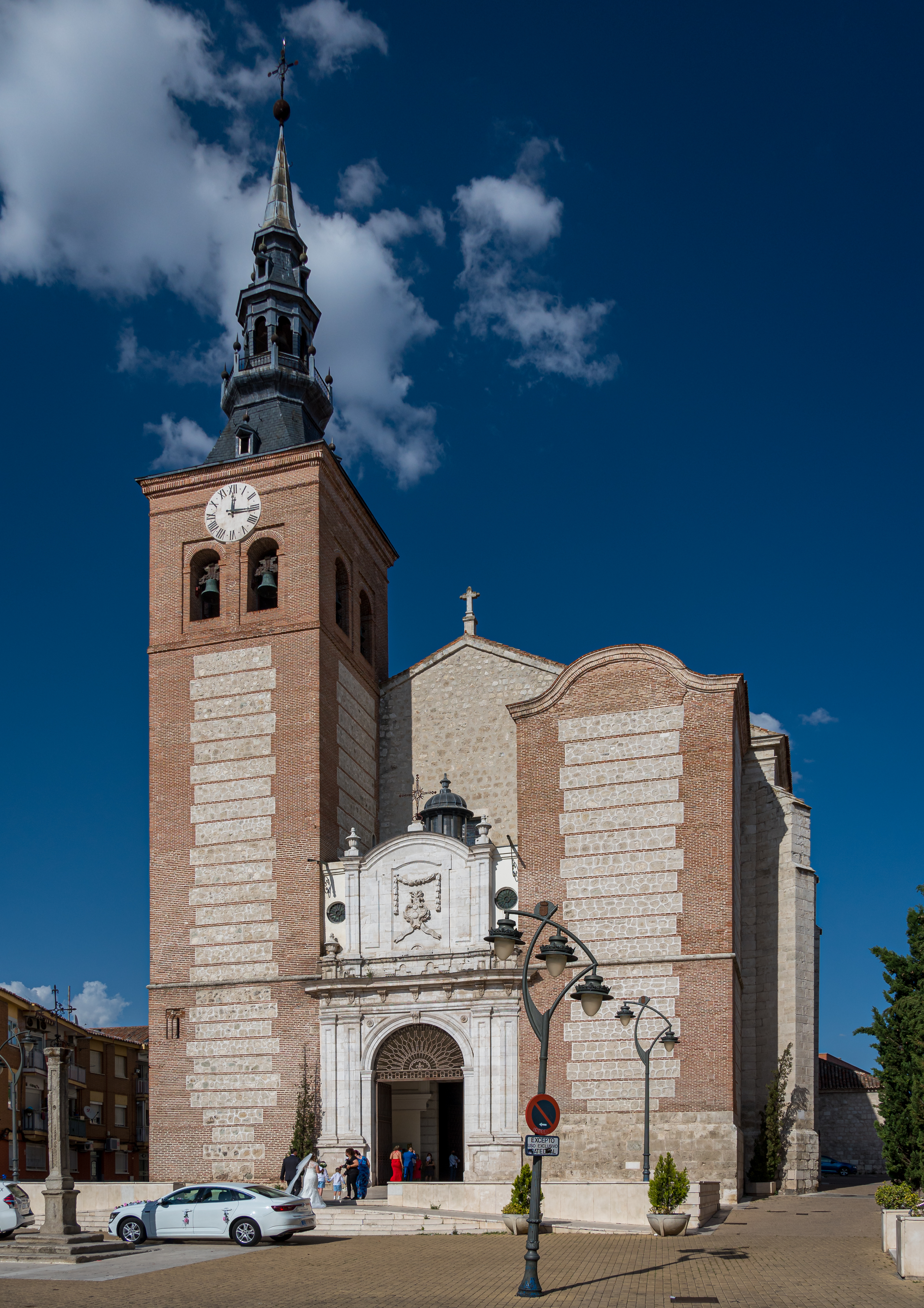
- West façade during a wedding
- Getafe Cathedral
- 40.303992°N 3.729199°W
- Location: Getafe
- Address: 1, Plaza de la Magdalena
- Country: Spain
- Denomination: Catholic
- Website: catedralgetafe.es

History
- Status: Cathedral
- Dedication: Mary Magdalene
- Dedicated: 23 July 1995

Architecture
- Architect(s): Alonso de Covarrubias, Juan Gómez de Mora
- Style: Mudéjar, Baroque, Neoclassic
- Years built: 1549 - 1770

Administration
- Metropolis: Madrid
- Diocese: Getafe

Clergy
- Bishop: Ginés García Beltrán

Spanish Cultural Heritage
- Type: Non-movable
- Criteria: Monument
- Designated: 9 May 1958
- Reference no.: RI-51-0001260

The Cathedral of Saint Mary Magdalene Catedral de Santa Maria Magdalena is a Roman Catholic cathedral located in Getafe, Spain. The edifice was a church for most of its existence, before becoming a cathedral in 1995 after the establishment of the Diocese of Getafe.

The church, designed by Alonso de Covarrubias and Juan Gómez de Mora, was begun in the 16th century and finished in 1770. The bell tower, dating to a pre-existing edifice from the mid-14th century, is in Mudéjar style, while the rest of it is predominantly Renaissance or Baroque.

== Gallery ==
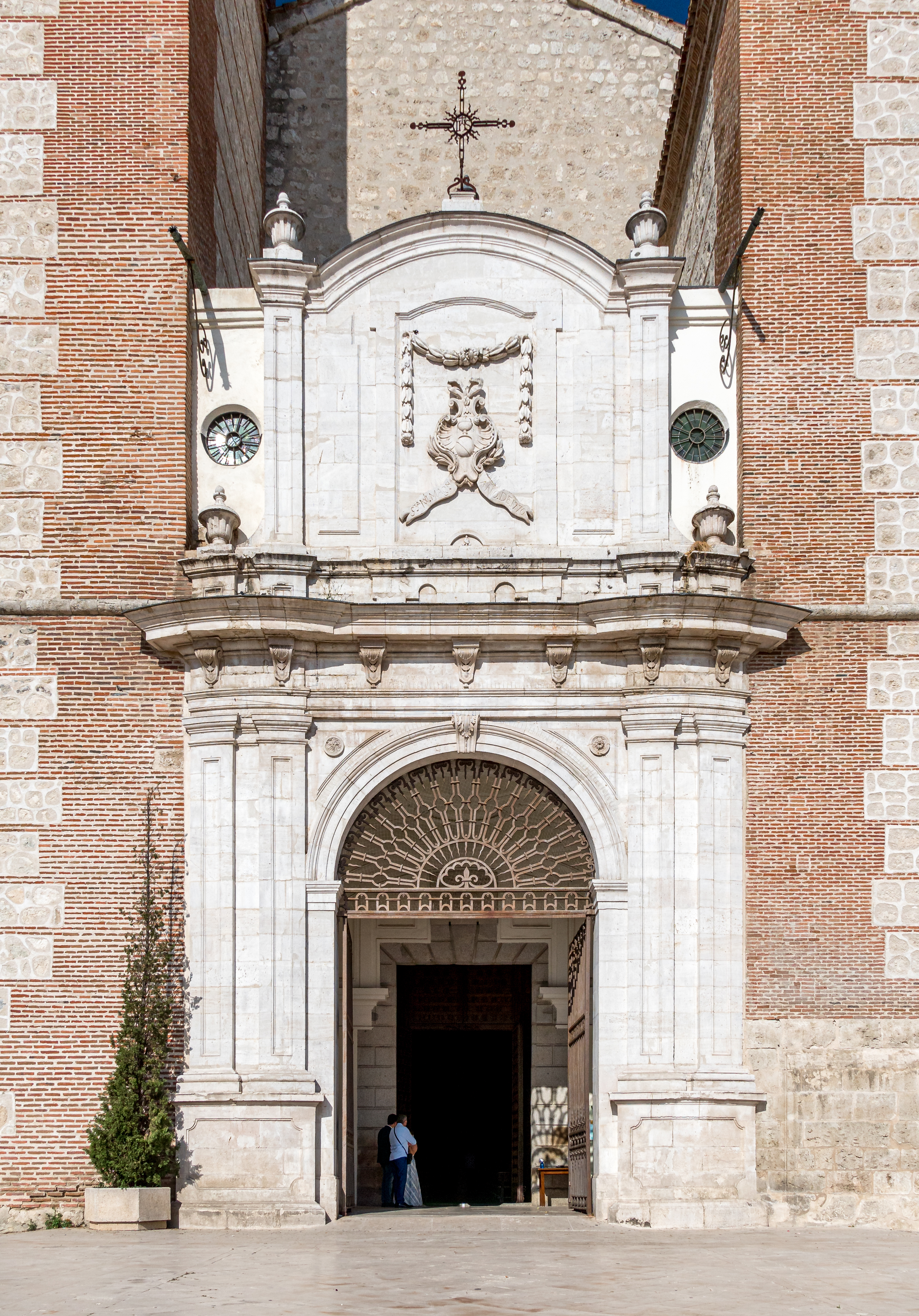
West portico

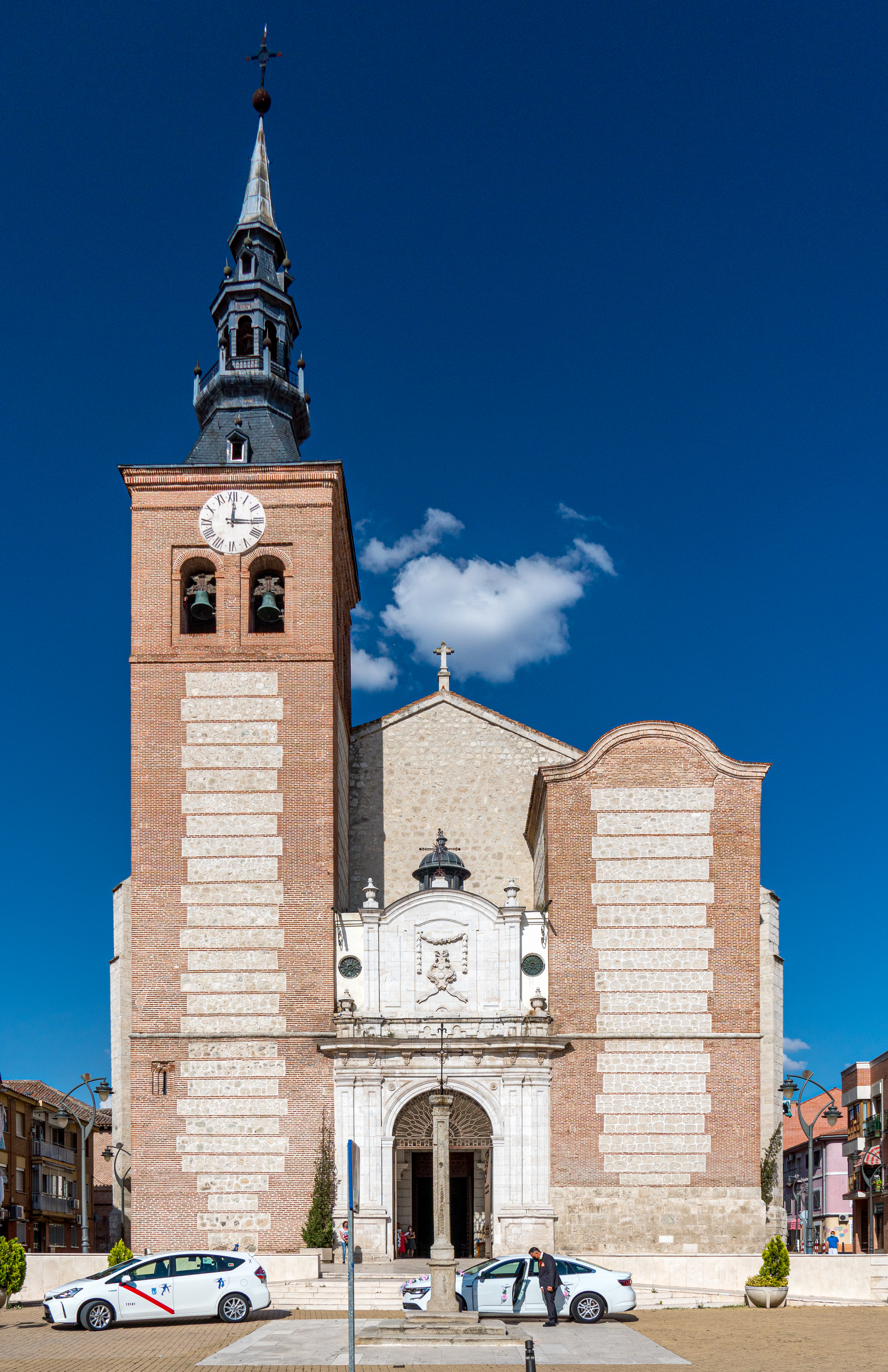
Frontal view

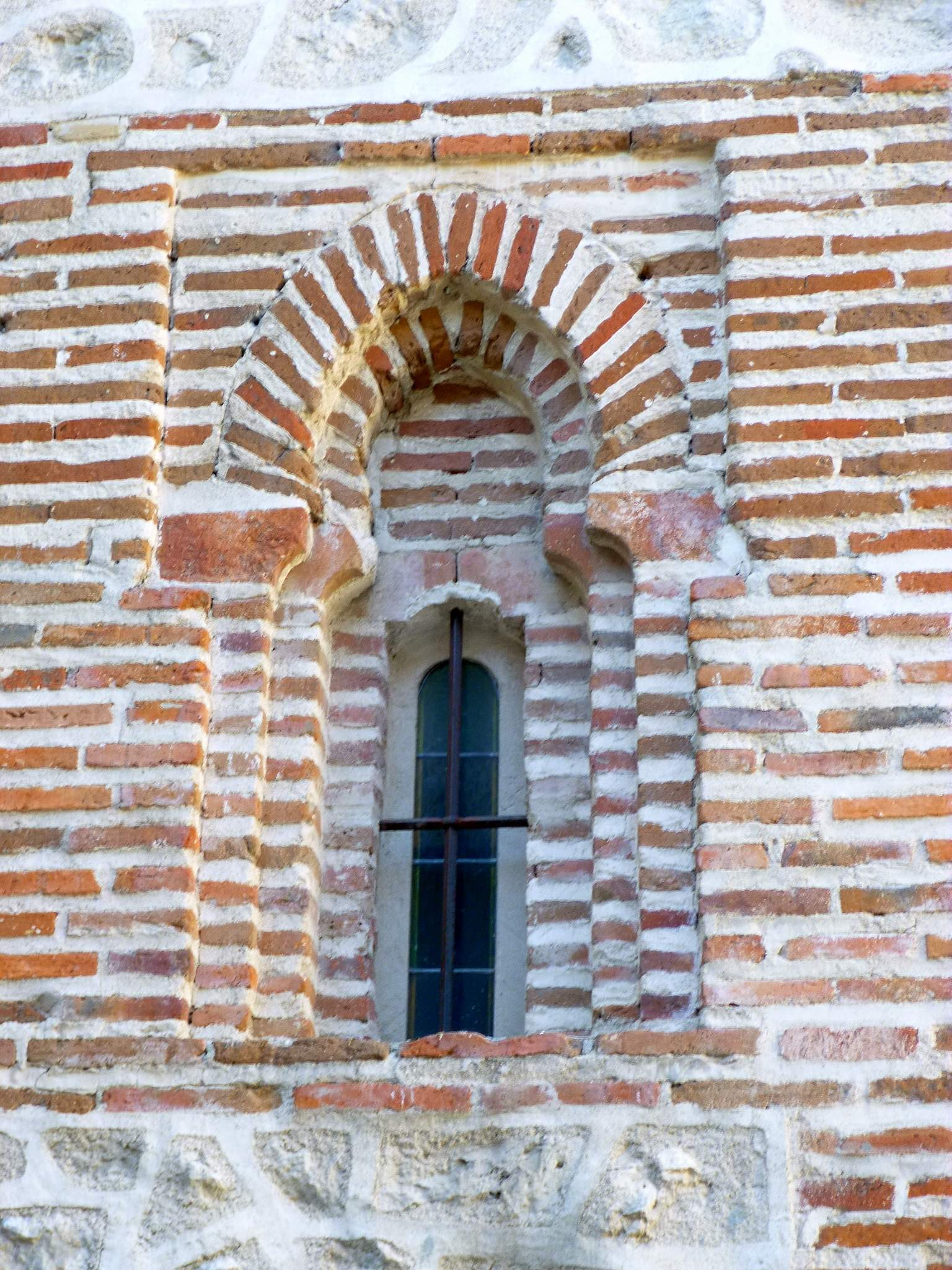
Mudéjar window

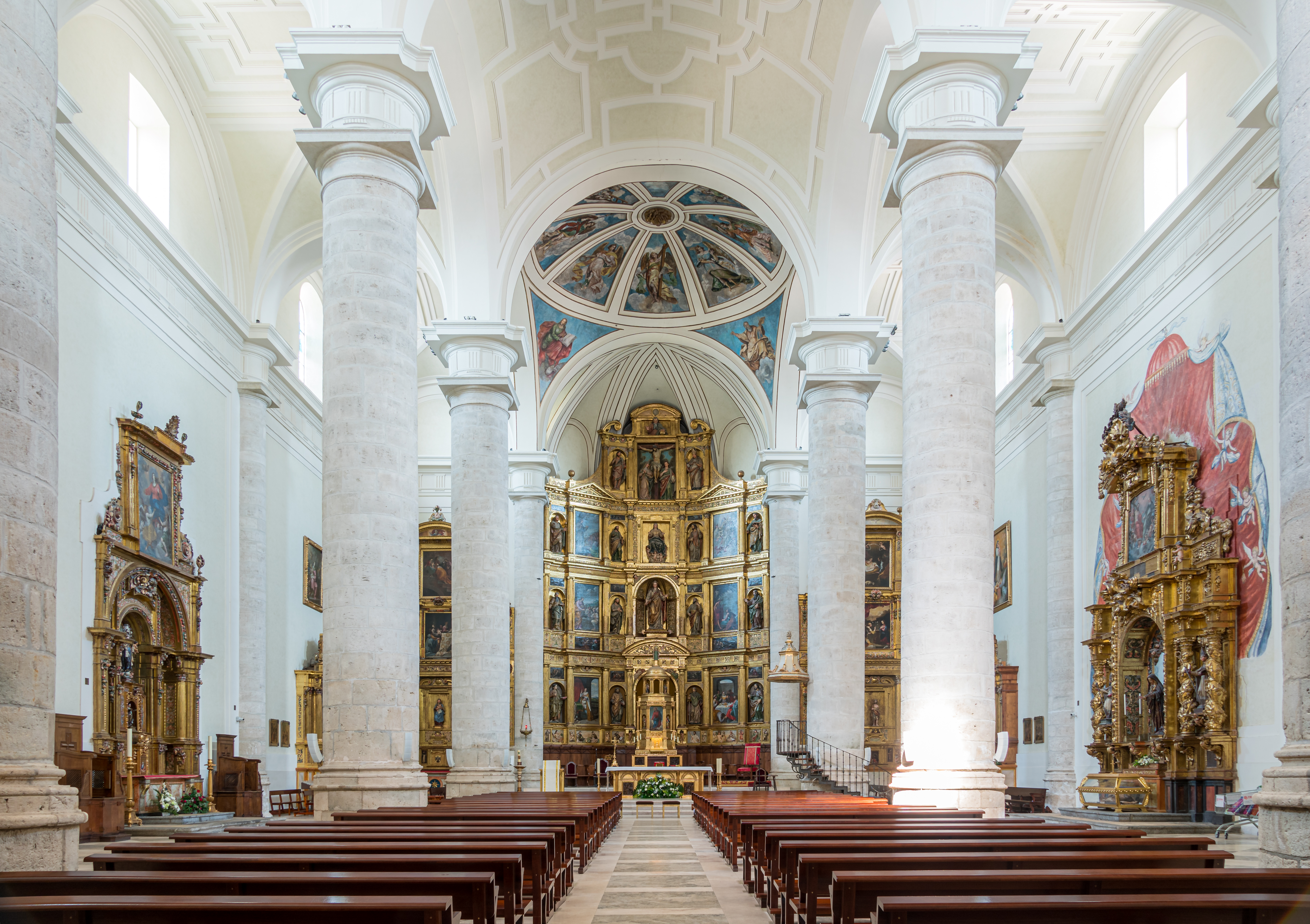
Central nave

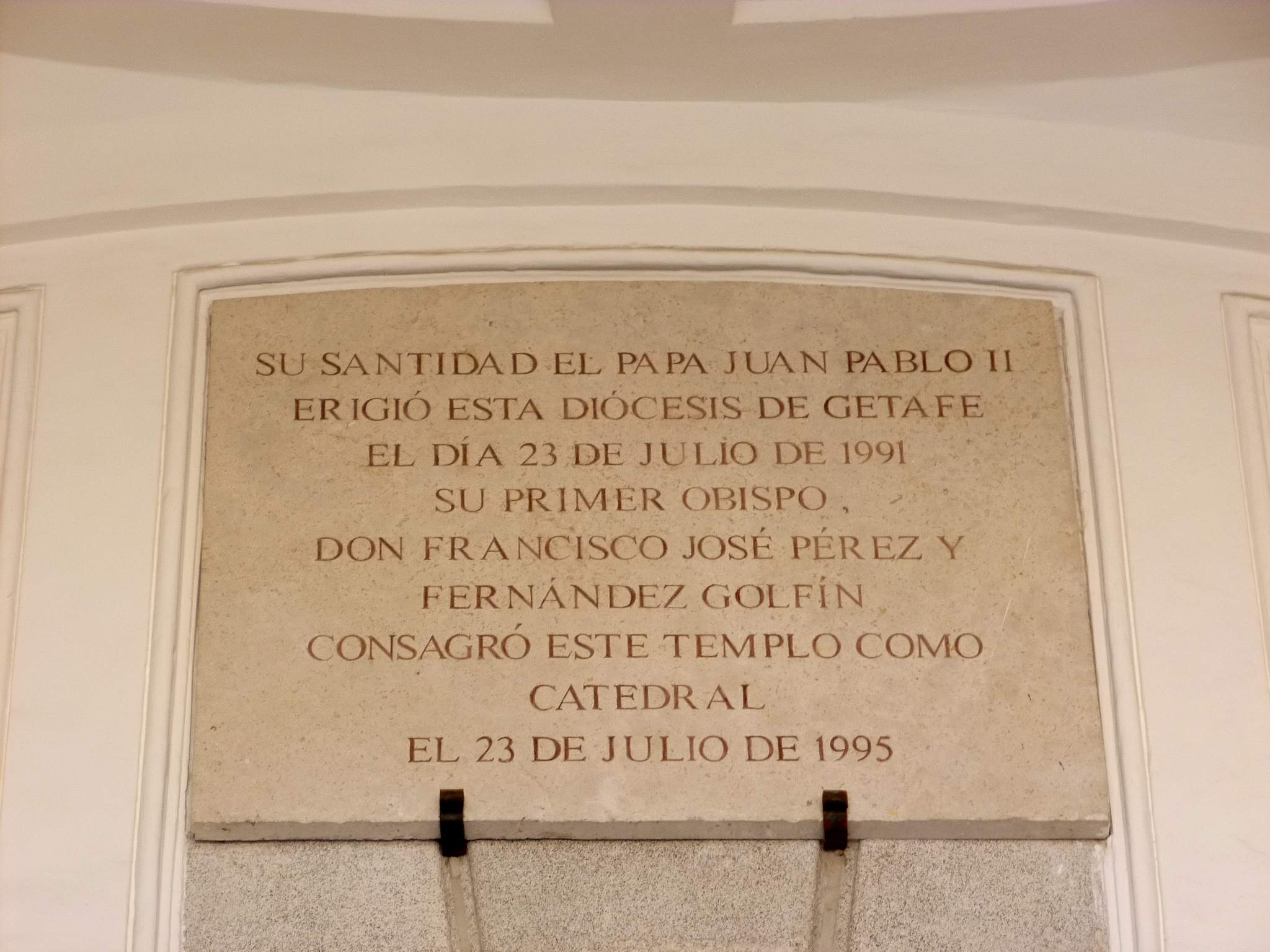
Plaque celebrating the dedication as cathedral.

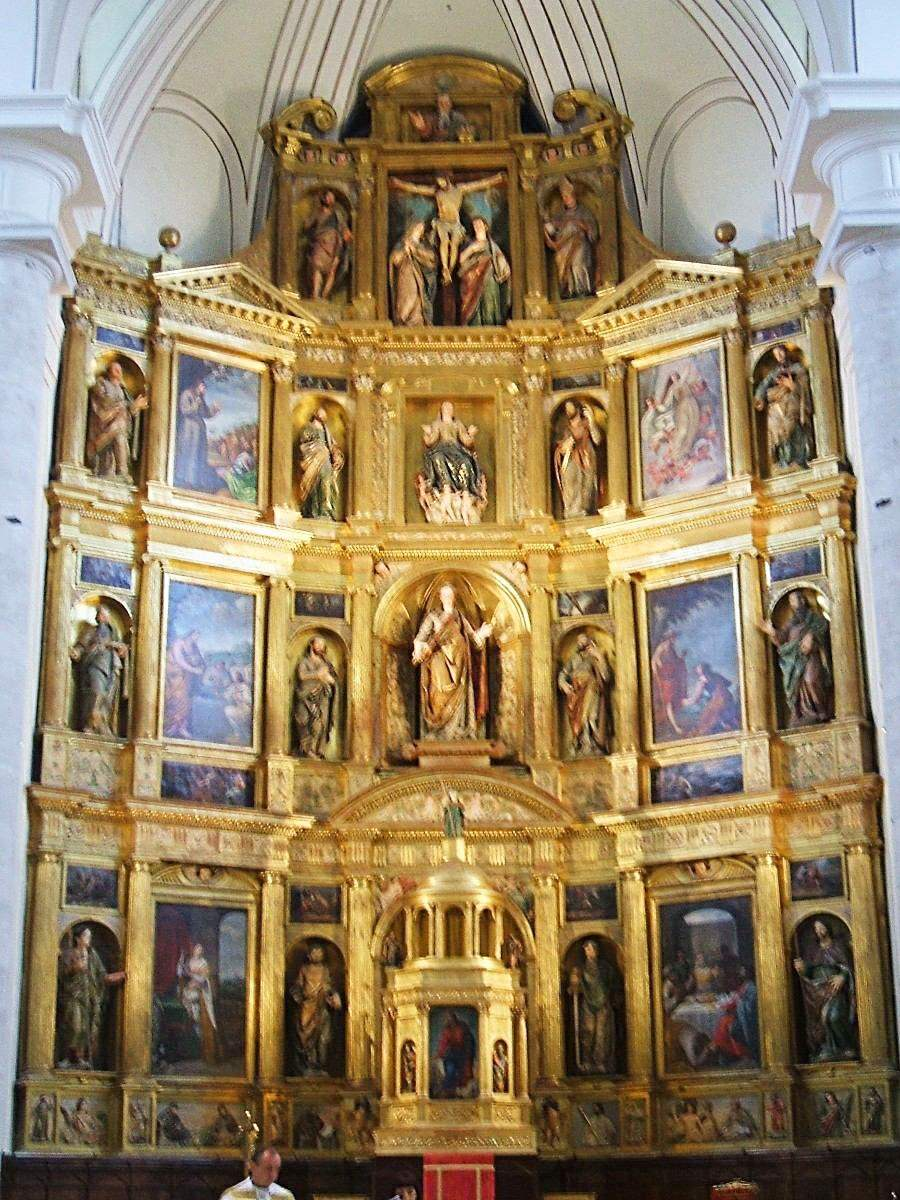
Altar

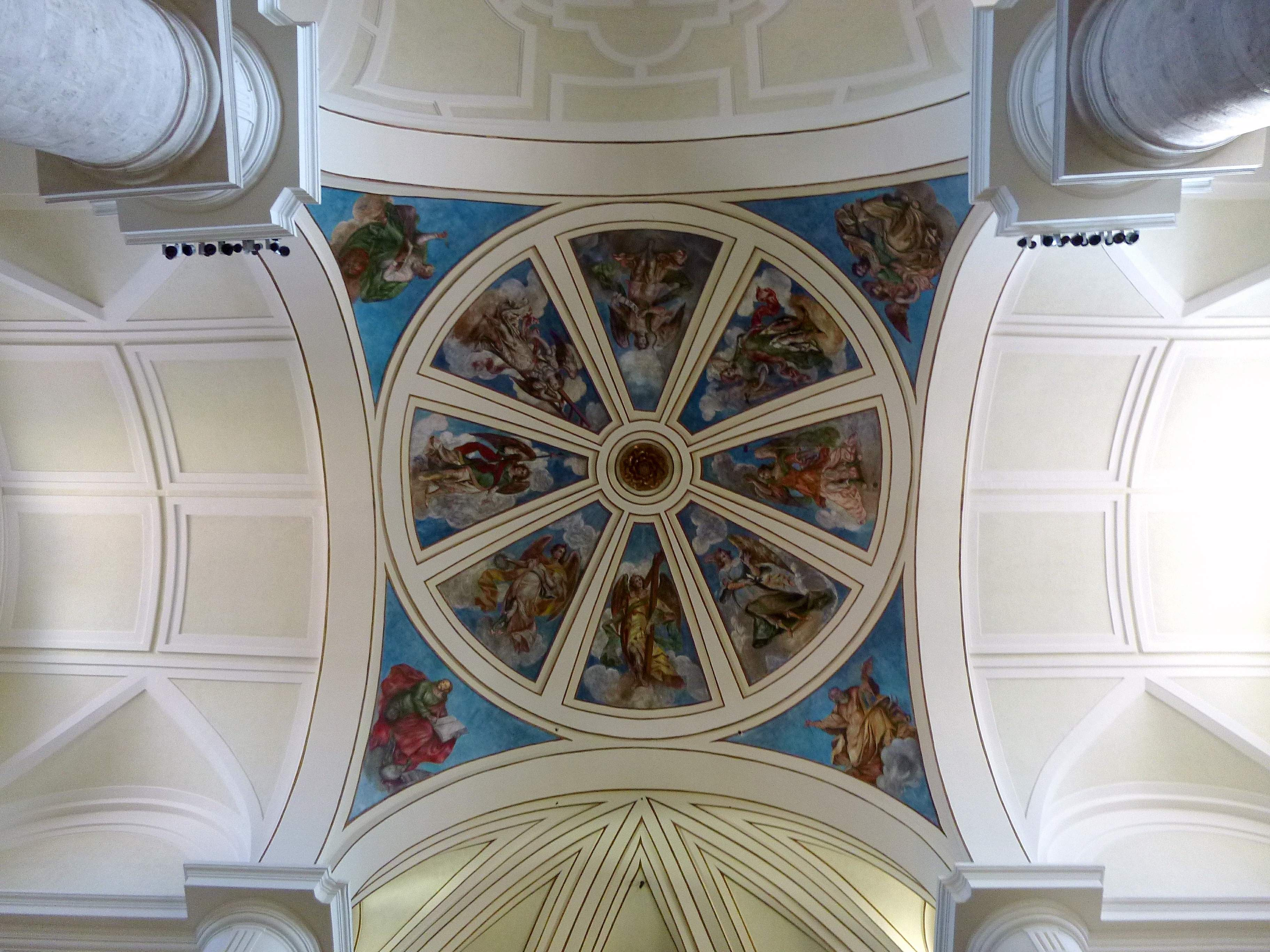
Dome

== Sources ==
- Sánchez González, Martín (1989). De Alarnes a Getafe. Getafe: Ayuntamiento de Getafe. ISBN 978-84-505-8587-2.
