= Giovanni Vincenzo Zerbi =

Italian painter

Giovanni Vincenzo Zerbi was a 17th-century Italian painter of the Baroque period, who was mainly active in Genoa as a portrait artist. He was a disciple of the Genoese painter Domenico Fiasella. He also painted under the name Vincenzio Zerbi.

== Sources ==
- Soprani, Raffaello (1769). Carlo Giuseppe Ratti (ed.). Delle vite de' pittori, scultori, ed architetti genovesi; Tomo secundo scritto da Carlo Giuseppe Ratti. Genoa: Stamperia Casamara. pp. 237. "Genovesi Raffaello Soprani."
