= Marani =

Marani may refer to:

== People ==
- Diego Marani, Italian writer and EU-policy advisor and translator
- Manuel Marani (born 1984), Sammarinese international footballer
- Mauro Marani (born 1975), Sammarinese international footballer
- Michele Marani (born 1982), Sammarinese international footballer
- Mohammad Marani (born 1963), Iranian military leader within the Islamic Revolutionary Guard Corps
- Pietro C. Marani (born 1952), Italian art historian
- Rosanna Marani (born 1946), Italian journalist and television presenter

== Other ==
- marani, Georgian word for winery
- Marani, Georgia, a village in Abasha District, Georgia
- Marani, Iran, a village in Namin County, Iran
- Mirani, Iran, a village in Ardabil County, Iran
- 21306 Marani, an asteroid
