= Domenico Fiasella =

Italian painter (1589–1669)

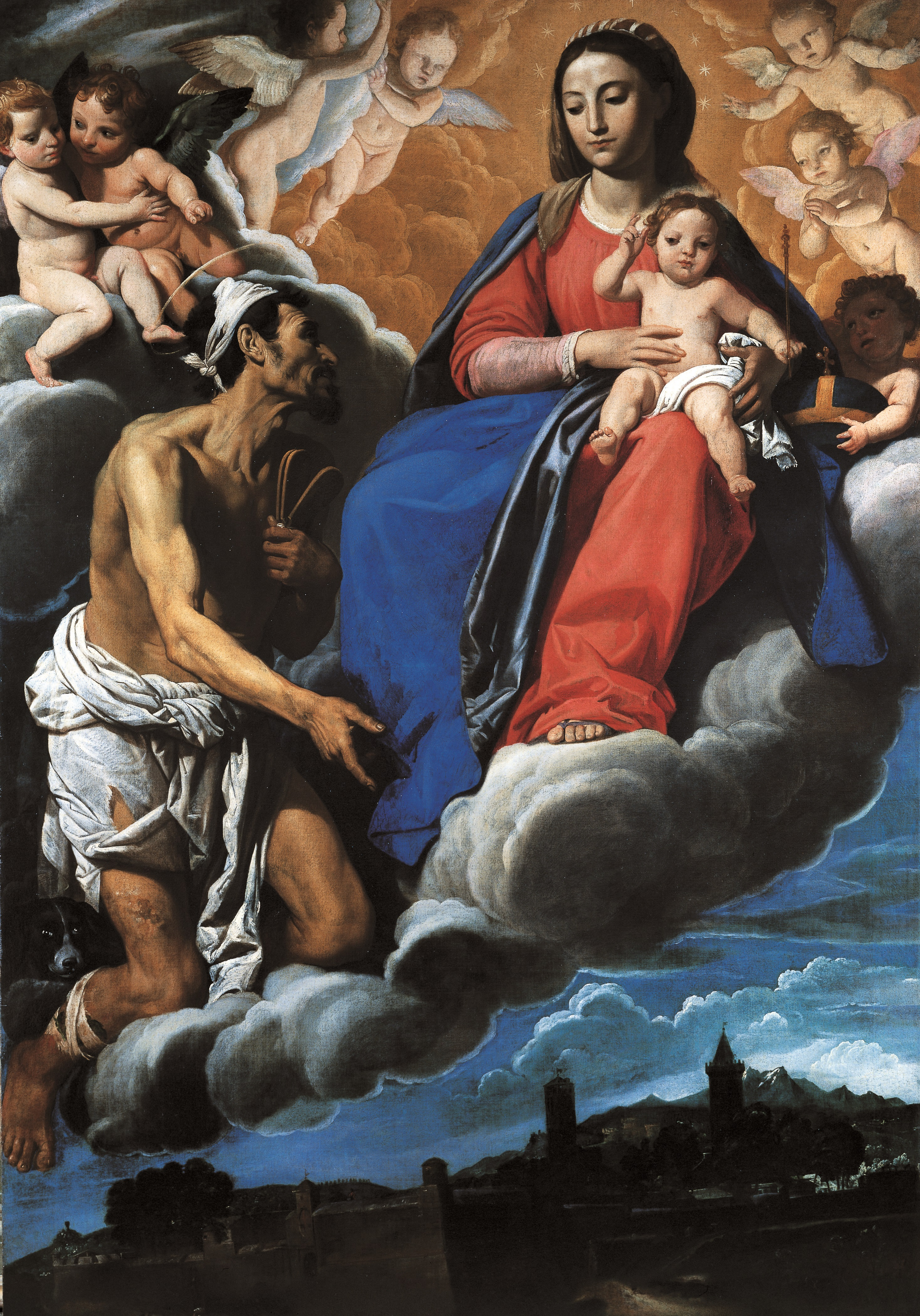
- Saint Lazarus Imploring the Virgin for the City of Sarzana (1616), Church of Saint Lazarus, Sarzana
- Born: 12 August 1589; Sarzana, Republic of Genoa
- Died: 19 October 1669 (aged 80); Genoa, Republic of Genoa
- Other name: Il Sarzana
- Education: Aurelio Lomi; Giovanni Battista Paggi
- Known for: Painting
- Movement: Baroque

Domenico Fiasella (12 August 1589 – 19 October 1669) was an Italian painter of the Baroque period, mainly active in Genoa. He was nicknamed Il Sarzana, after his birthplace of Sarzana near Genoa.

== Biography ==
He was the son of Giovanni Fiasella, a silversmith, who, noting his skills apprenticed him as a boy of 11 years to work with Aurelio Lomi in Genoa, and from there he moved to work with Giovanni Battista Paggi.

Around 1607 he left for Rome, where he frequented the Accademia del Nudo. His ability was first recognized by Guido Reni and Ciriaco Mattei, which led Domenico Passignano and Cavalier D'Arpino to employ him. The Marchese Vincenzo Giustiniani commissioned paintings from him, including Christ Healing the Blind and Christ Raising the Son of the Widow of Nain (both of which were ultimately purchased by John Ringling and bequeathed to the John and Mable Ringling Museum of Art upon his death). During his stay in Rome, he also completed The Flight into Egypt (now in the Museum & Gallery collection), which may also be the work described by biographer Raffaello Soprani in 1674. He writes: “One of the most famous performances by Fiasella in Rome was the picture representing the Holy Virgin with Saint Joseph and the Infant Jesus on their way to Egypt. This picture was presented to Pope Paul V, who liked it very much.”

Fiasella's painting of Flight into Egypt had been a gift to Paul V. His Assumption of the Virgin altarpiece for Santa Maria Assunta church in Roccasecca dei Volsci, was commissioned by Valerio Massimi for 70 scudi. An Annunciation in the same church was sold for 40 scudi. He returned to Genoa by 1616, where he set up a prolific studio. He frescoed the Story of Esther for the Palazzo Lamellini alla Zecca in Genoa. Gregorio De Ferrari was one of his pupils during 1664–1668. Other pupils include Angelica Veronica Airola, Valerio Castelli, Francesco Capurro, Francesco Gentileschi, Francesco Merano, Giovanni Paolo Oderico, Luca Saltarello, Giovanni Stefano Verdura, Lazzaro Villanova, Giovanni Andrea Podestà and Giovanni Vincenzo Zerbi. He collaborated occasionally with the Flemish born painter Giacomo Legi who lived and worked in Genoa. Fiasella also designed frontispieces, including one for the Leggi delle compere di S. Giorgio (Genoa, 1634), another for Il genio ligure (Rome, 1650), engraved by Cornelis Bloemaert in Rome, and another for La Grillaia by Angelico Aprosio (Naples, 1668). He died in Genoa.

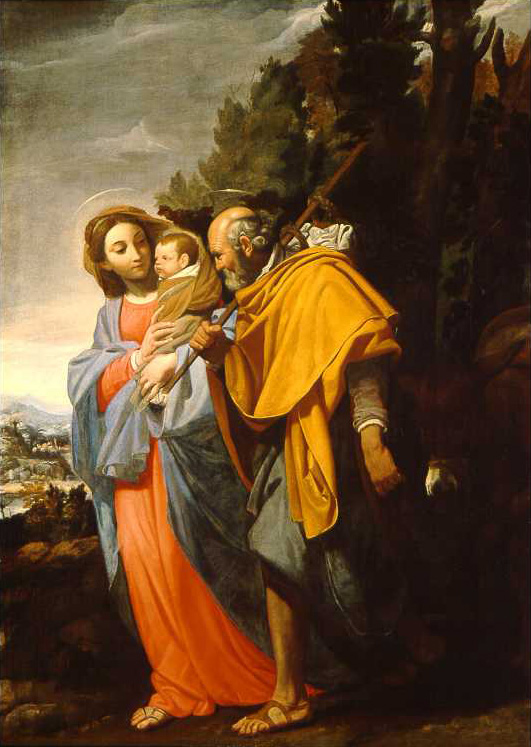
Flight to Egypt (Roman period 1607–1615), Greenville, South Carolina (US)

== Works ==
- Cathedral of Sarzana
  - The Visitation, Saints Lazzaro, Nicola and Giorgio, Glory of Holy Blood in the Chapel of Relics,
  - Saints Apollinare, Lucia, and Cecilia (1626), St Andrew’s martyrdom (1653) with a supposed self-portrait, and The massacre of the Innocents
- St. Andrew Church
  - Vocation of SS. James and John.
- San Lazzaro, Sarzana
  - St. Lazzaro (with a view of Sarzana)
- Lerici
  - The Sacred Family with Bishop Eligio and Abbot Andrew, in the Oratory of St. Rocco
  - Madonna with Child and SS. Bernardino and Francis, in the Oratory of St. Bernardino.

== Sources ==
- Comune di Sarzana biography
- Two Roman Paintings by Domenico Fiasella, by Francesca Cappelletti, The Burlington Magazine (1998) pp28–30.
- Flight into Egypt, Museum & Gallery, Greenville, South Carolina
- Grove Encyclopedia biography on Artnet.
- Newcome, M. (2003). "Fiasella, Domenico [il Sarzana]". Grove Art Online. doi:10.1093/gao/9781884446054.article.T028152.
