= Nadalino da Murano =

Italian painter

Nadalino da Murano, also known as Natalino (active first half of 16th century) was an Italian painter, known for painting or copying works in the style of Titian, his master.

Presumably born in Murano, he trained under Titian. He painted both portraits and sacred subjects. He painted a Madonna with St Roch and St Sebastian for the cathedral of Ceneda. Many of his paintings were sold in the foreign markets, and some had risqué themes. Many were sold in foreign markets in the low countries and England.

Giorgio Vasari claims he completed one of the works of Battista Franco.
