= Camogli =

Camogli Camoggi (Ligurian)
- Comune
- Comune di Camogli
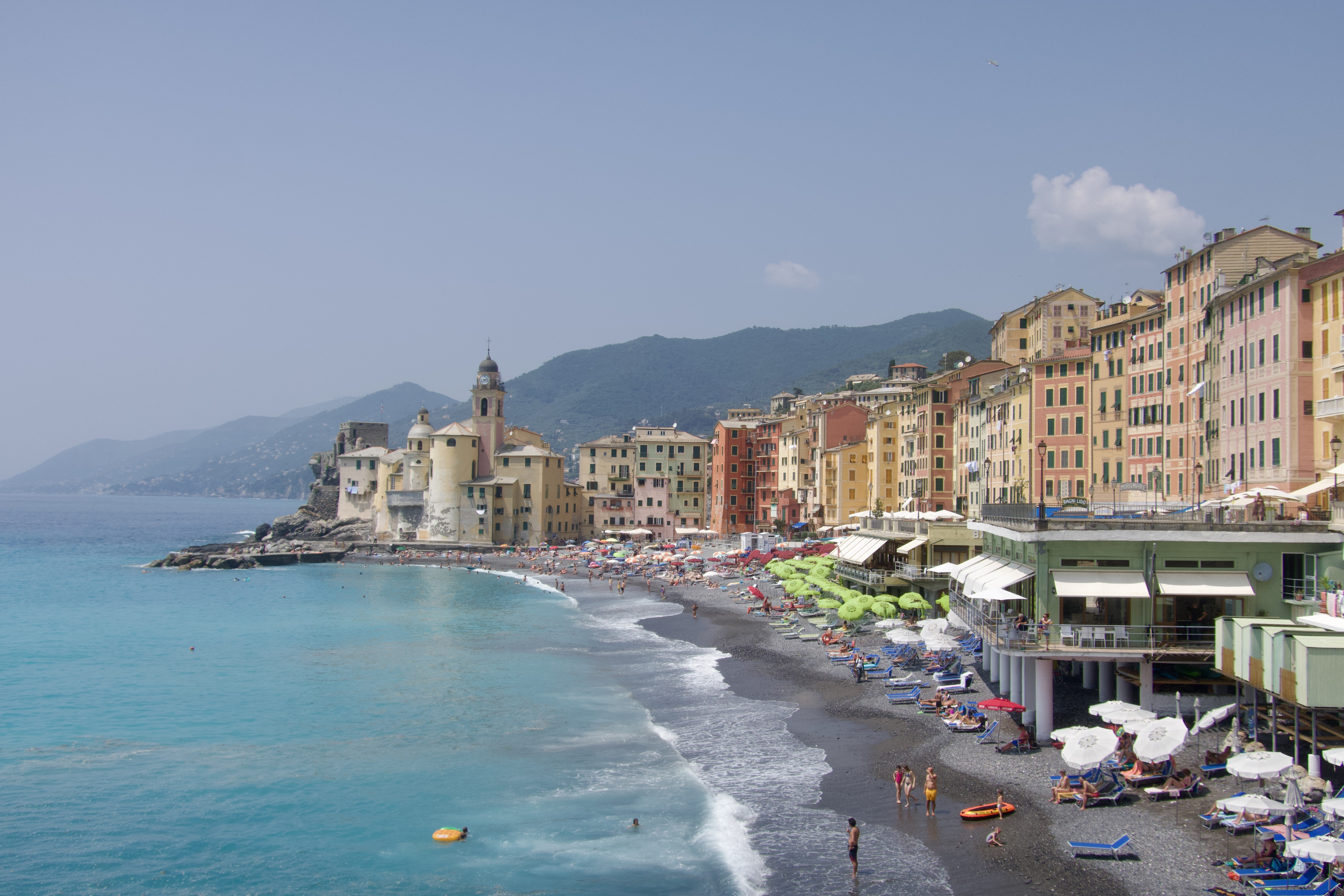
- Camogli waterfront

- Flag Coat of arms

- Location within Italy Location within Liguria
- Coordinates: 44°21′N 9°9′E
- Country: Italy
- Region: Liguria
- Metropolitan city: Genoa (GE)
- Frazioni: Ruta, San Fruttuoso, San Rocco

Government
  - Mayor: Giovanni Anelli

Area
  - Total: 9.9 km^{2} (3.8 sq mi)
- Elevation: 9 m (30 ft)

Population (31 July 2024)
  - Total: 4,898
  - Density: 490/km^{2} (1,300/sq mi)
- Demonym: Camoglini or Camogliesi
- Time zone: UTC+1 (CET)
  - Summer (DST): UTC+2 (CEST)
- Postal code: 16032
- Dialing code: 0185
- Patron saint: N. S. del Boschetto
- Saint day: 2 July
- Website: Official website

Camogli (Italian: [kaˈmoʎʎi, -ˈmɔʎʎi]; Genoese: Camoggi [kaˈmudːʒi]) is a fishing village and tourist resort located on the west side of the peninsula of Portofino, on the Golfo Paradiso in the Riviera di Levante, in the Metropolitan City of Genoa, Liguria, northern Italy. As of 30 April 2017 its population was 5,332. Camogli is one of the largest areas of the Parco Naturale Regionale di Portofino, and a part of the Portofino Marine Protected Area.

== History ==
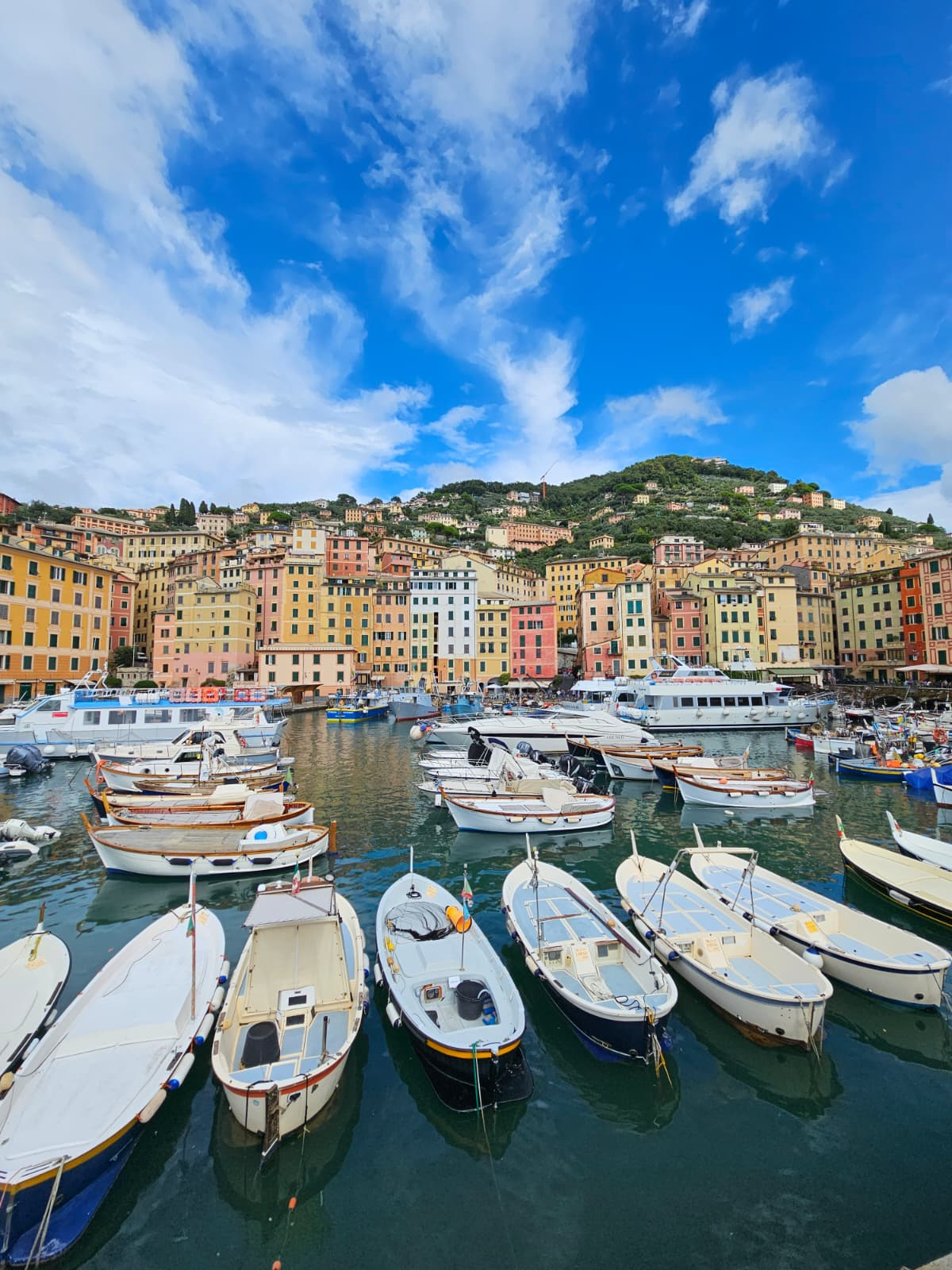
Port of Camogli

The name of the town is of ancient, though of disputed origin.

A folk etymologic story suggests it comes from the shortened Casa de Moglie. When the ship captains sailed, they put their wives (mogli) in a sort of home for all of them (casa), and the town was well known for this.

In the late Middle Ages, Camogli was a considerable seaport. In its heyday, its fleet consisted of hundreds of Tall Ships, and it was called the "city of a thousand white sails". In 1798 the city hosted a large contingent of Napoleon's fleet, which was then beaten in the Egyptian waters of the Nile by Admiral Nelson. The prestigious naval college "Cristoforo Colombo" was founded in Camogli in 1874, named after the Genoese navigator Christopher Columbus.

In 1880, the former fishing village had, in a population of 12,000, 500 registered as ship captains. Camogli now relies mainly on tourism and is known for its colorful houses that line the beach. The house colors once helped the fishermen of Camogli find the way back to their port.

The local swimming club water polo RN Camogli has won several Italian championships and is known nationwide.

In February 2021, the cliff collapsed below the cemetery that is sited 70m above the water, and coffins fell into the sea. 11 caskets were recovered from the water, and more from the landslide.

== Trivia ==
Camogli Hospital on the South Atlantic island of Tristan da Cunha is named after the town, to commemorate the fact that it was the home of Andrea Repetto and Gaetano Lavarello, who settled on the island in 1892.

== People ==
- Francesco Capurro, 17th-century painter
- Ruggero Chiesa (1933–1993), classical guitarist and editor
- Carlo Taranto 20th-century TV satirical writer

== Twin towns ==
- Tuningen, Germany, since 1998
- Carloforte, Italy, since 2004
