= Giovanni Paolo Oderico =

Italian painter (1613–1657)

Giovanni Paolo Oderico (1613–1657) was an Italian painter of the Baroque period, mainly active in Genoa. He was born in Genoa. One of many sons to a lesser nobleman, Tomasso Oderico, he showed affinity to painting, and was apprenticed to the Genoese painter Domenico Fiasella.

== Sources ==
- Soprani, Raffaello (1769). Carlo Giuseppe Ratti (ed.). Delle vite de' pittori, scultori, ed architetti genovesi; Tomo secundo scritto da Carlo Giuseppe Ratti. Genoa: Stamperia Casamara. pp. 237. "Genovesi Raffaello Soprani."
