= Marano (surname) =

Family name

Marano as a surname has noble Italian origin, derives from last name Marani of Vicenza that came to Naples in the 16th century with Francesco Antonio buried in the church of Sant'Antonelli to Caponapoli in the ancient center of Naples city. Afterwards succeed to Francesco Antonio, Domenico, baron of the Preturo in 1591; Nicola with decree of the Gran Court on December 11, 1691, inherited all the properties of family and getting the title of marquis of Petruro on May 28, 1695, in Madrid; Alexander Marano was last marquis of the Petruro in the 19th century.

== Overview ==
The surname was ascribed to the Register of the Vassals and recognized of ancient nobility in 1843 for the admission in the "Company of the Regal Watches" in person of Giovanni Camillo. Pietro Antonio Marano 1° lieutenant of the "12° Battalion Hunters" has participated in the 1860/61 against Piemontesi that invaded the Kingdom of the Two Sicilies. Registered in the list "Official Noble Italian" since 1922.

First found in Modena, anciently Multina, a city in Emilia capital of the province of Modena. It became Roman in 215 B.C. It was successfully defended by Brutus against Mark Antony. It changed hands many times between Church and Duchy. In 1859 the inhabitants declared in favor of unity with the Kingdom of Italy. The Ducal Palace is notable. Rick in art the city has many museums and galleries. But many noted scholars were born there. In those ancient times only persons of rank, the podesta, clergy, city officials, army officers, artists, landowners were entered into the records. To be recorded at this time in itself a family honor.

Some of the first settlers of this family name or some of its variants were: Francis Marano, who settled in Charles Town (Charleston), South Carolina in 1843; Pater E. Maregno, who arrived in Vermont sometime between 1854 and 1923.

== Marano family name ==
Italian: habitational name from any of various places named with the Latin personal name Marius + the suffix -anu, notably Marano di Napoli (Campania), Marano Lagunare (Friuli-Venezia Giulia), Marano Marchesato (Cosenza, Calabria), and Marano dei Marsi (L’Aquila, Abruzzo).

Spelling variations of this family name include: Marano, Maranto, Maurano, Mauritano, Marangoa and many more.

== People with the surname ==
- Adam Marano, American music producer of T.P.E. Featuring Adam Marano
- Cindy Marano (1947–2005), American economist
- Ezio Marano (1927–1991), Italian actor
- Francesco Marano (born 1990), Italian professional footballer
- Julie Marano (born 1996), French triathlete
- July Marano (born 2008), Italian artistic gymnast
- Kristie Marano (born 1979), American wrestler
- Laura Marano (born 1995), American teen actress and singer
- Lizbeth Marano (born 1950), American artist and photographer
- Luigi R. Marano (1921–2017), American politician
- Philomena Marano (born 1952), American artist
- Vanessa Marano (born 1992), American actress

== See also ==
- Aby Maraño (born 1992), Filipino volleyball player
