= Francesco Merano =

Italian painter (1619–1657)

Francesco Merano (1619–1657) was an Italian painter of the Baroque period, mainly active in Genoa, where he was born. He was one of the pupils of the Genoese Domenico Fiasella. Merano was also known as il Paggio. He married the niece of the painter Giovanni Andrea de' Ferrari.

== Sources ==
- Soprani, Raffaello (1769). Carlo Giuseppe Ratti (ed.). Delle vite de' pittori, scultori, ed architetti genovesi; Tomo secundo scritto da Carlo Giuseppe Ratti. Genoa: Stamperia Casamara. pp. 324–326. "Genovesi Raffaello Soprani."
