= San Lazzaro, Modena =

San Lazzaro
- Chiesa di San Lazzaro
- San Lazzaro
- 44.6375°N 10.9474°E
- Location: via Emilia Est, Modena
- Country: Italy
- Denomination: Roman Catholic

History
- Founded: 12th century

San Lazzaro is a Roman Catholic church in Modena, Italy. It is all that now remains of the former lazaretto or lepers' hospital built to the east of the city in the 12th century.
