= San Lazzaro, Sarzana =

Church building in San Lazzaro di Sarzana, Italy

San Lazzaro is a 19th-century, Roman Catholic church located on Via Aurelia number 298 in the neighborhood of San Lazzaro di Sarzana, just south-east of Sarzana, region of Liguria, Italy. The parish church happens to be located, for historical reasons, within the region of Tuscany.

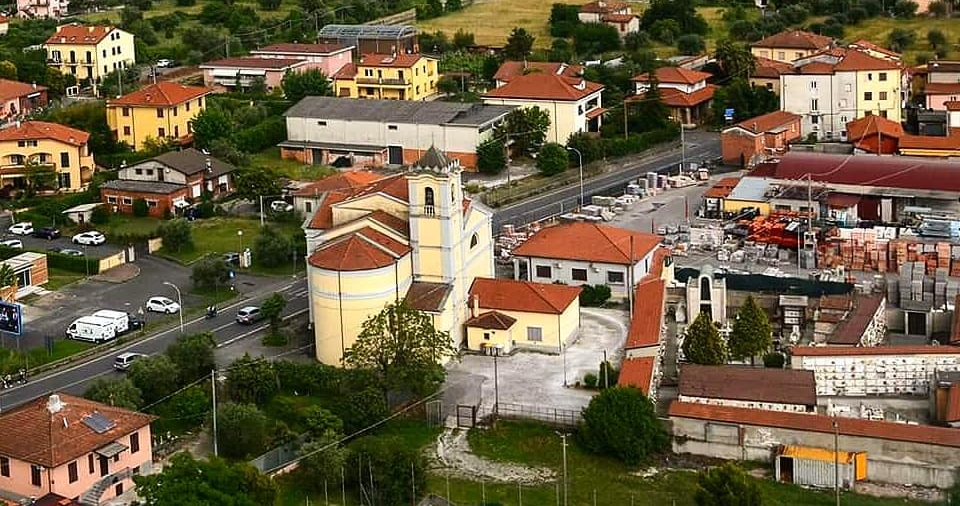
Panoramic of San Lazzaro, with the parish church

The parish church has a Greek-cross plan and its façade has some classical features. The large wooden portal is a remarkable 19th-century manufacture.

== History ==
The church was built between 1843 and 1880, and replaced the chapel of the ancient hospital on Via Francigena. As was typical, this type of hospital (also called leprosariums) were erected distant and outside of the walls of towns. A number of hospitals lined the routes of Via Francigena to host the pilgrims, who often travelled until Rome or Santiago de Compostela.

The hospital of San Lazzaro (also called the hospital of Servarecia) is almost certainly mentioned in the Codice Pelavicino from about 1150, and recalled in documents and testaments from 1228 and 1262. It may have been on the route taken in the year 990 by Sigeric on his itinerary on the Via Francigena.

Over the years, the hospital's wealth grew thanks to the income imposed on the land and the donations of sicks. Because of this reason, in 1469 Pope Paul IV placed the hospital under the administration of the Cathedral of Sarzana. In 1584, the ecclesiastical official Monsignor Angelo Peruzzi visited the hospital and ordered that the small chapel had to be restored and adorned with a new sacred icon.

In 1616, the painter Domenico Fiasella was hired to perform an important painting work: San Lazzaro implora la Vergine per la città di Sarzana (in english: St. Lazarus implores the Virgin for the city of Sarzana).

The painting is a set of artistic styles: from the classicism of the figure of the Virgin, typical of Renaissance art, to the realism of the figure of Lazarus, typical of the style of Caravaggio. The whole work is also a play of lights and shadows, which on the one hand represent the divine salvation and on the other hand the danger that symbolically hangs over the city. The view of Sarzana, in the lower part of the painting, is a thorough representation of the city and its landscape during the 17th century and includes the defensive walls, the bell towers, the fortress of Sarzanello and the Apuan Alps. In the painting, the realism of Lazarus' body and drapery it’s striking, as well as the brilliance of the Mary’s robe colours. The blue colour used here by Fiasella is a very rare color, whose pigment directly came from Middle East.

The history of the hospital of San Lazzaro ended at the end of the 18th century: the whole structure was transformed into a dwelling for poor people. The population of San Lazzaro began to grow and the small chapel was not large enough. So that, people decided to build a new larger church, and the project was followed by Genoese architect Nestore Pucci. The new church was consecrated on 22 October 1880.

In addition to the painting by Domenico Fiasella, in the new church were brought other artworks that were originally hosted in the old chapel: For instance, the painted frame by Giovanni de Negri (1630), representing a series of Saints; A 15th century bas-relief representing Saint John the Baptist and Saint Catherine of Alexandria; A 14th century holy water font and a baroque bas-relief depicting the Annunciation. Tiziano and Angelo Triani, two painters from Pontremoli, made the interior decorations and frescoes.

The flank of the present church runs parallel and adjacent to the south-bound lane of the Via Aurelia, on the road from Sarzana southwest to Avenza and subsequently Massa.

== Gallery ==
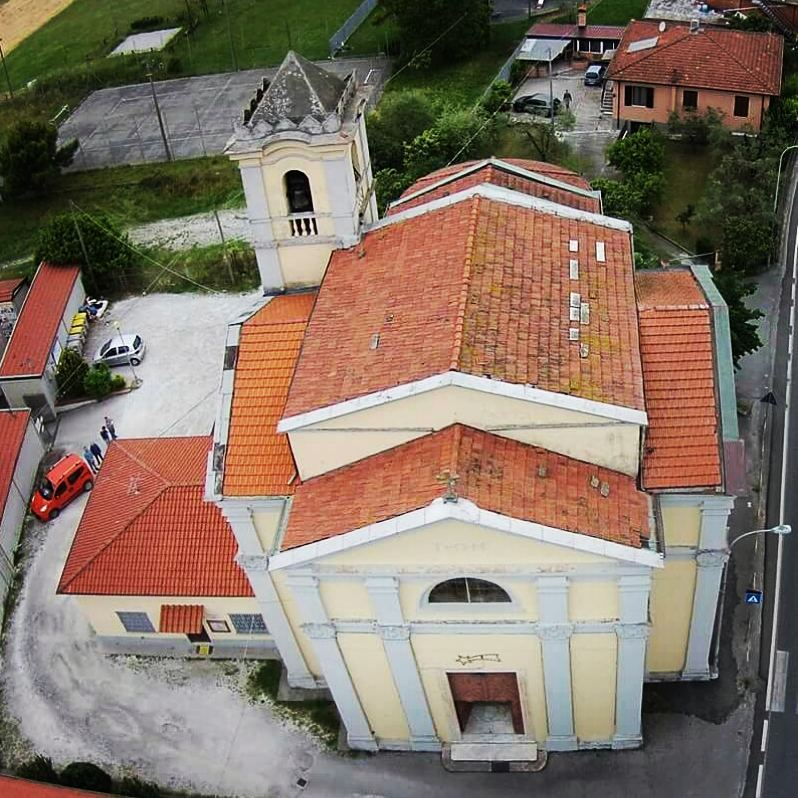
The parish church, from the drone

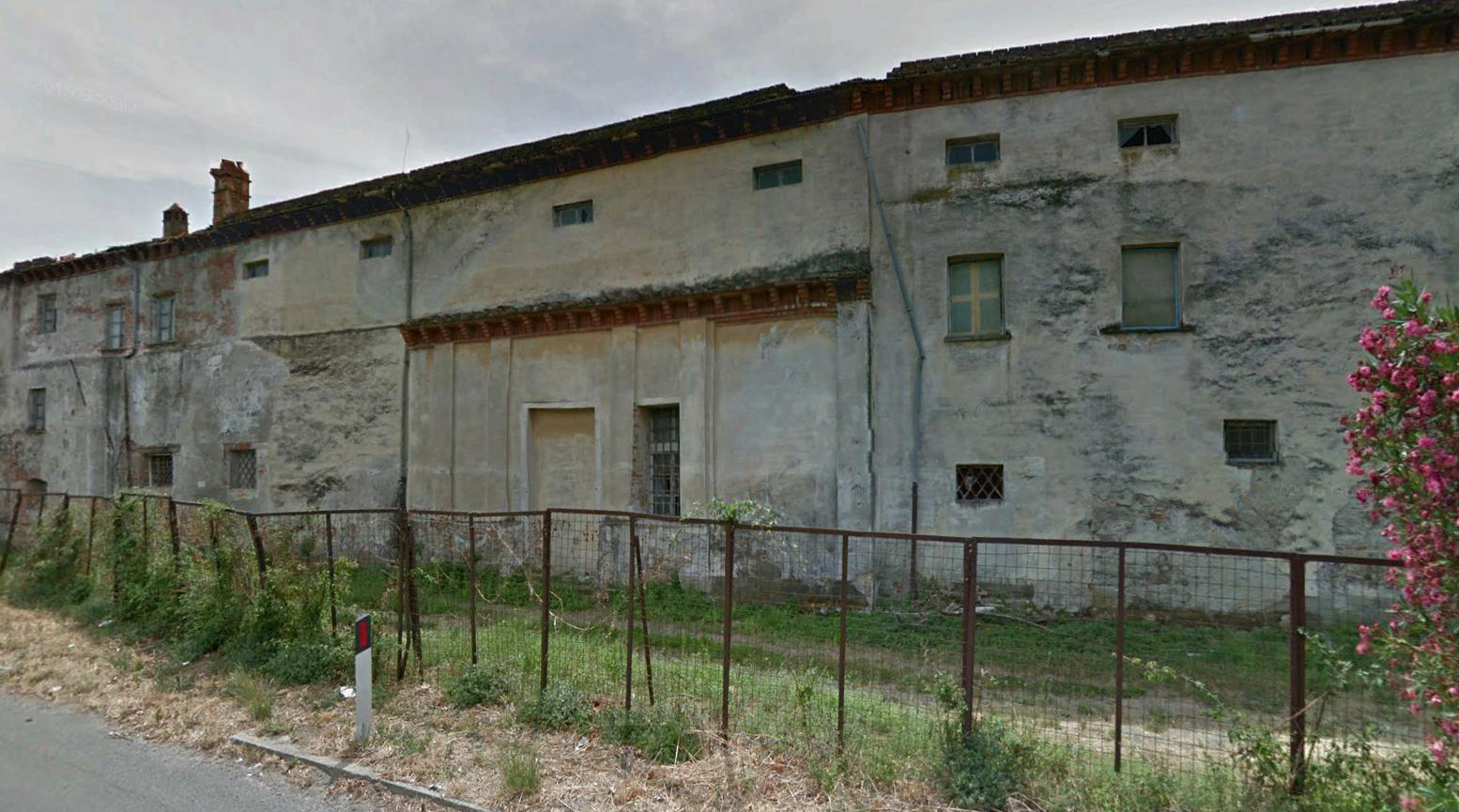
The ancient ospital of San Lazzaro

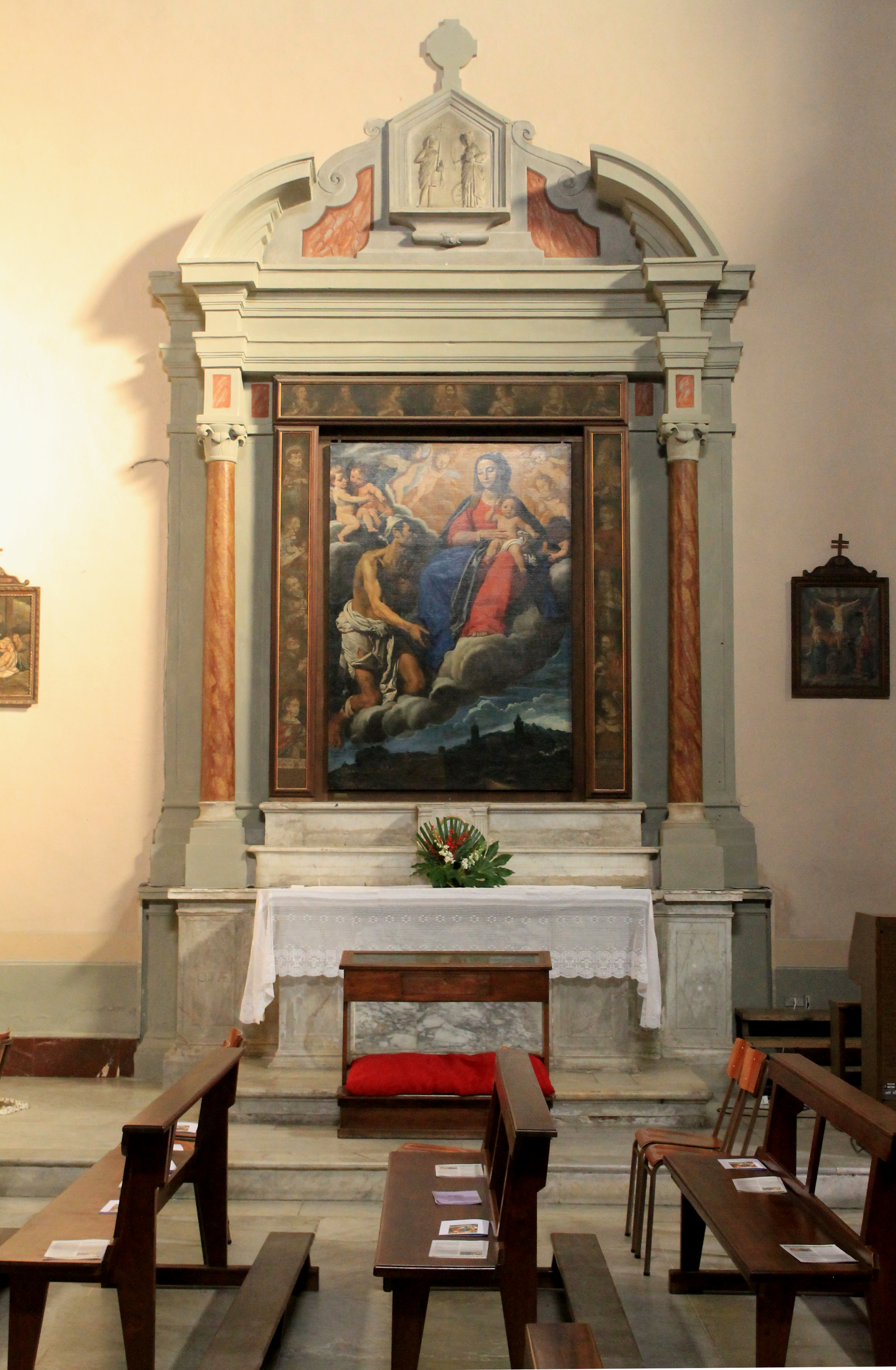
The altar with the painting of Domenico Fiasella.

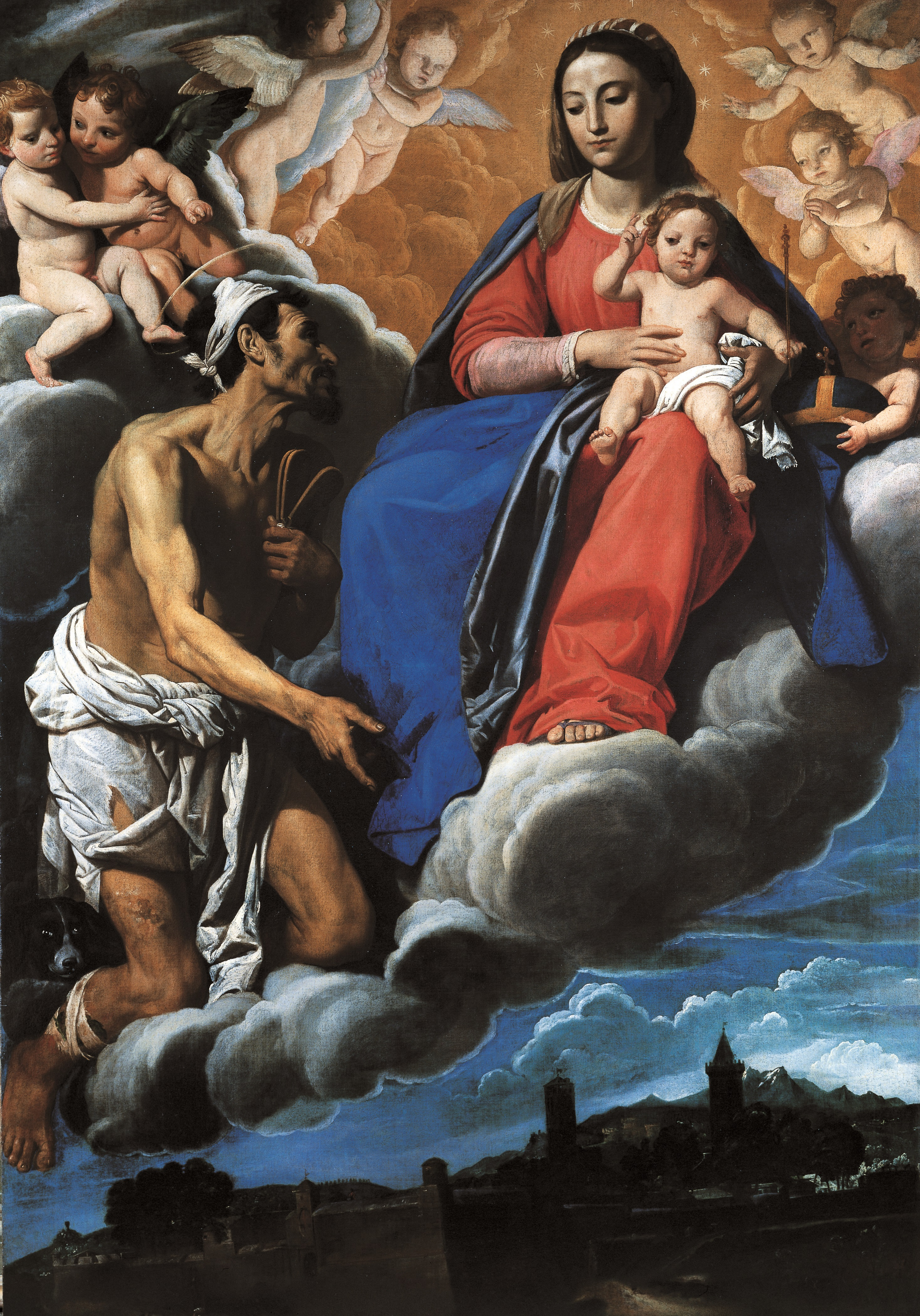
Domenico Fiasella, Saint Lazarus imploring the Virgin for the city of Sarzana (1616)
