= Artists in biographies by Filippo Baldinucci =

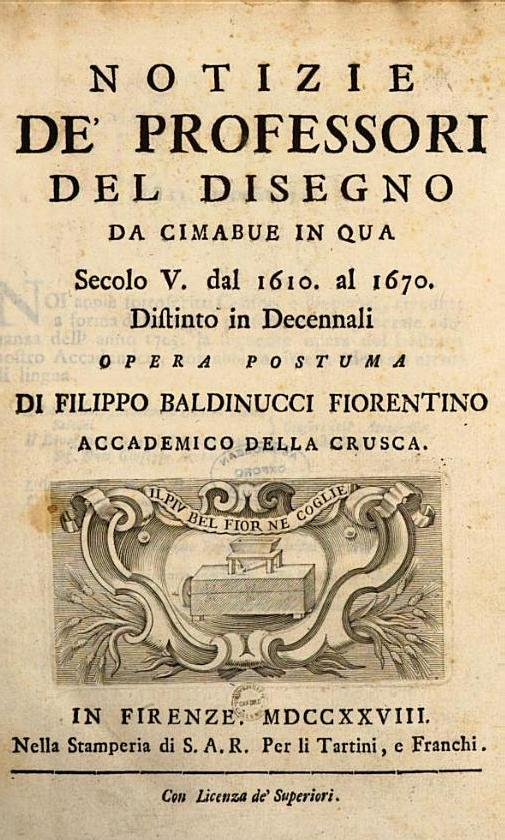
Titlepage of Notizie de' Professori del Disegno, Da Cimabue in qua, Secolo V. dal 1610. al 1670. Distinto in Decennali (or Notice of the Professors of Design, from Cimabue to now, from 1610–1670). Stamperia S.A.R. per li Tartini, e Franchi (1681)

Filippo Baldinucci's Notizie de' Professori del Disegno, Da Cimabue in qua, Secolo V. dal 1610. al 1670. Distinto in Decennali (or Notice of the Professors of Design, from Cimabue to now, from 1610–1670) was a major art biography of Baroque painters. The work covered 6 volumes, published between 1681 and 1728.

== Contents ==
Written by the erudite Florentine professor of the Accademia della Crusca, the work is often verbose and rife with factual errors; however, it is a broad compendium of stories about generally contemporaneous Baroque painters.

Dozens of Flemish and Dutch painters, including Rembrandt, were judged to merit inclusion. Though Baldinucci may have met some of these Northern painters on their travels to Italy, the majority of the Dutch and Flemish names he included had biographical notes under portraits engraved by Jan Meyssens, whose work was popular, and whose engravings were reused by Cornelis de Bie for his 1682 book Het Gulden Cabinet. Baldinucci included both De Bie (in his father "Adriano de Bie"'s entry) and Meyssens in his book. The posthumous edition (1681) includes (in order of appearance in the text) and expanding list of artists:

== Decennale II ==
- Giovanni da S. Giovanni; p. 1
- Gio: Lorenzo Bernini; p. 54
- Giovanni Bilivert; p. 68
- Fra Arsenio Mascagni (Donato Mascagni); p. 79
- Agostino Bugiardini; p. 83
- Astolfo Petrazzi; p. 85
- Astasio Fontebuoni (Anastasio Fontebuoni); p. 86
- Rutilio Manetti; p. 92
- Gherardo Silvani; p. 93
- Jacopo Callot; p. 109
  Artists from the low countries
  Francesco Snyders (Frans Snyders); p. 120
  Guglielmo de Nicolant (Willem van Nieulandt II); p. 120
  Adamo Willaerts; p. 120
  Gasparo Cleayer (Caspar de Crayer); p. 120
  Rolando Saveri (Roelant Savery); p. 121
  Enrico Van der Borcht (Hendrik van der Borcht the elder); p. 121
- Jacopo Ernesto Thoman de Hagelstein; p. 121
- Giovanni Stefano Marucelli; p. 122
- Giovanni Coccapani; p. 123
- Sigismondo Coccapani; p. 132
- Chiarisimo d'Antonio Fancelli; p. 136
- Orazio Mochi; p. 137
- Raffaello Curradi; p. 138
- Ottavio Vannini; p. 141
- Giovanni Lanfranco; p. 151
  Artists from Genoa and its territories
  Sinibaldo Scorza; p. 154
  Giovanni Andrea Ansaldo; p. 156
  Bernardo Strozzi; p. 157
  Giovanni Maria Bottala; p. 159
  Luciano Di Silvestro Bolzone; p. 159
  Giovambatista Capellino (Giovanni Domenico Capellino?) p. 161

== Decennale III ==
- Fra Giovanni Battista Stefaneschi; p. 163
- Monsu Giusto Subtermans (Justus Sustermans); p. 167
- Michelangelo Cerquozzi; p. 189
  Artists from Low Countries
  Adriano van Utrecht (Adriaen); p. 197
  Giovanni Guglielmo Bawr, (Johann Wilhelm Baur, Strasbourg); p. 197
  Niccola Canupfer, (Nikolaus Knüpfer); p. 197
  Jacopo di Giordano or Giacomo Giordans (Jacob Jordaens); p. 197
  Baldasarr Gerbier, (Balthazar Gerbier); p. 197
  Lionardo Bramer (Leonaert Bramer); p. 197
  Adriano de Bie (Adriaan de Bie, father of Cornelis de Bie); p. 198
  Adriano Vander Venne, (Adriaen van de Venne); p. 198
  Gheraldo Honthorst (Gerard van Honthorst); p. 198
  Pietro Snayers (Peter Snayers); p. 198
  Jacopo Vrancqaert; p. 198
- Francesco Lauri; p. 199
- Francesco Rustici; p. 200
- Snyders D'Anversa, (Frans Snyders); p. 201
- Giovambatista Vanni; (Giovanni Battista Vanni); p. 201
- Cesare Dandini; p. 210
- Felice Ficherelli; p. 219
- Filippo Uffembach; p. 226
- Orazio Riminaldi; p. 227
- Andrea Camassei; p. 228
- Mario Balassi; p. 233
- Cornelio Bloemaert; p. 238
- Stefano della Bella; p. 242
- Giovanni Gonelli; p. 253
- Francesco Furini; p. 258
- Girolamo Curti; p. 267
- Cavaliere Gio. Francesco Barbieri, (Giovanni Francesco Barbieri)
- Angiol Michele Colonna; p. 276
- Antonio Vandich (Anthony van Dyck); p. 279
- Francesco Diquesnoy (Francesco Duquesnoy); p. 283
- Agostino Metelli; p. 286
  Artists from the city of Venice and its territories
  Cavaliere Carlo Ridolfi; p. 289
  Marc'Antonio Bassetti (Verona); p. 292
  Tommaso Sandrino (Brescia); p. 292
  Piero Damini, (Pietro Damini, Castelfranco); p. 293
  Filippo Zaniberti (Brescia); p. 293
  Matteo Ingoli (Ravenna); p. 294
  Francesco Zugni, (Francesco Zugno, Brescia); p. 294
  Giovambatista Brisone (Padua); p. 295
  Tiberio Tinelli
- Niccolo Possino (Nicolas Poussin); p. 297
  Artists from Genoa or Liguria
  Giovambatista Carlone; p. 303
  Giovacchino Axereto (Gioacchino Assereto); p. 304

== Decennale IV ==
- Angiol Maria Colomboni (Angelo Maria Coloboni); p. 305
- Cosimo Lotti; p. 306
- Baccio del Bianco; p. 311
- Alfonso Parigi; p. 332
- Alessandro Algardi; p. 235
- Pellegrino Piola; p. 338
- Antonio Novelli; p. 339
- Claudio Gellee; p. 353
- Pietro Ricchi; p. 360
- Pietro Paolino; p. 364
- Cav. Giovanni Miel (Jan Miel); p. 366
- Cav. Francesco Borromino; p. 370

- Painters from low countries
  Jacopo Backer (Jacob Adriensz Backer); p. 375
  Giovanni Van Hoeck, (Jan van de Hoeck); p. 375
  Andriano Van Nieulaht (Adriaen van Nieulandt the younger); p. 375
  Piero Francesco o Franchoys (Peter Franchoys) p. 375
  Giovanni Bot (Jan Both) p. 375
  David Beck; p. 376
  Teodoro Rombouts; p. 376
  Tommaso Willeborts Bossaert (Thomas Bosschaert Willeboirts); p. 376
  Buonaventura di Piero; p. 376
  Francesco Wouters; p. 376
  Andrick Andriesens; p. 376
  David Teniers il Giovane; p. 376
  Ruberto Van Hoeck (Robert van den Hoecke); p. 376
  Gio Batista Van-Heil (Jan Baptist van Heil); p. 377
  Pietro Meert (Pieter Meert); p. 377
  Giovanni Vanden-Heckc, (Jan van den Hoecke); p. 377
  Carlo da Savoia; p. 377
  Giovanni Meyssens (Jan Meyssens); p. 377
  Gasparo de Wit; (Gaspar de Witte) p. 377
  Paolo de Ponte; p. 377
- Pietro de Jode (Pieter de Jode II); p. 378
  Leone Van-Heil (Leo van Heil); p. 378
  Pietro Verbrugghen (Pieter Verbrugghen I); p. 378
  Simone Bosboon; p. 378
  Vincislao Hollar (Wenceslas Hollar); p. 378
  Artu Chellini (Artus Quellinus I); p. 378
  Geraldo Segiers; p. 378
  Giovani Bylort (Jan van Bylert); p. 378
  Cornelio Poulenbourgh (Cornelis van Poelenburgh); p. 378
  Erasmo Chellino (Erasmus Quellinus II); p. 378
  Giovanni Corsiers; p. 379
  David Bally (David Bailey; p. 379
  Erasmo Saftleven Herman Saftleven; p. 379
  Giovanni Van Brochorst (Jan Gerritsz van Bronkhorst); p. 379
  Abramo Van Diepenbecck; p. 379
  Pietro Danckerse de Ry (Peter Danckerts de Rij); p. 379
  Daniello Van-Heil (Daniel van Heil); p. 379
  Cornelio Janssens (Cornelis Janssens van Ceulen); p. 379
  Jacopo di Artese; p. 379
  Jacopo Wan Campen (Jacob van Campen); p. 380

== Decennale V ==
- Baldassare Franceschini; p. 381
  Painters from the low countries
  Daniel Segiers (Daniel Seghers; p. 415
  Jacopo Van Es (Jacob Foppens van Es); p. 415
  Pietro Van Lint (Peter van Lint); p. 415
  David Ryckaert (David Ryckaert II); p. 416
  Gonsalo Coques (Gonzales Coques); p. 416
  Niccola de Helt Stocade (Nicolaes van Helt Stockade); p. 416
  Giovambatista Van Deynum (Jan Baptist van Deynum); p. 416
  Giorgio Van Son (Joris van Son); p. 416
  Giovanni Van Ckesselles (Jan van Kessel, senior); p. 416
  Errico Berckmans; p. 416
  Gian Filippo Van Thielen (Jan Philips van Thielen); p. 417
  Giovanni Peters (or Pietri); p. 417
- Padre Jacopo Cortesi; p. 417 (Jacques Courtois)
- Alfonso Boschi; p. 426
- Prete Francesco Boschi; p. 428
- Lorenzo Lippi; p. 450
- Roberto Nantevil; p. 461
- Gasparo Dughet; p. 473
- Reimbrond Vainrein (sic); p. 476, (Rembrandt Van Rijn)
- Nicasius Bernaerts; p. 478
- Pietro Testa; p. 479
- Guobert Flynk; p. 484
- Cavaliere Carlo Rainaldi; p. 487
- Carlo Dolci; p. 491
- Eberhart Keilhau, or Bernhardt Keil or (Monsù Bernardo); p. 510
- Ercole Ferrata; p. 516
- Pierfrancesco Silvani; p. 528
  Artist from Genoa
  Francesco Merano (il Paggio); p. 532
  Giovambatista Bajardo; p. 533
  Giovambattista Mainero; p. 533
  Giovampaolo Oderico; p. 533
  A. Silvestro Chiesa; p. 534
  Giovambatista Monti; p. 534
  Orazio da Voltri; p. 534
  Gio. Benedetto Castiglione; p. 534 (Giovanni Benedetto Castiglione)
  Anton Maria Vassallo (scholar of Vincenzo Malo, pittore Fiammingo); p. 535
  Valerio Castello; p. 535
  Giulio Benso; p. 536
  Antonio Travi, also Antonio da Sestri; p. 536
  Piero Andrea Torre; p. 537
  Domenico Fiasella da Sarzana; p. 537
  Giovanni Andrea de' Ferrari; p. 538
  Francesco Capuro; p. 539
  Stefano Magnasco; p. 539
  Pier Maria Groppallo; p. 539
- Gio. Franc. Romanelli; p. 540
- Salvatore Rosa; p. 553
- Teodoro Helmbrecker (Dirk Helmbreker, Haarlem); p. 592
- Livio Mehus
- Diacinto Brandi (sic) (Giacinto Brandi); p. 613
- Francesco Allegrini; p. 614
- Ottaviano Jannella; p. 616

== Decennale VII and Part II ==
- Matteo Withoos (Matthias Withoos); p. 622
- David Coninche (David Koninck, Antwerp); p. 623
- Pietro Boel; p. 624
- Pietro van Bredael (Peeter van Bredael); p. 624
- Francesco Spierre (François Spierre); p. 625
- Cavalieri Fra Mattio Preti; p. 633
