= 1657 in art =

Events from the year 1657 in art.

== Events ==
- July - The outbreak of plague in Genoa reaches its height; it results in the deaths of many artists, as well as both the parents of 19-year-old painter Giovanni Battista Gaulli and two of the three sons of Luciano Borzone.
- Nicolaes van Verendael becomes a member of the Guild of St Luke at Antwerp.

== Paintings ==
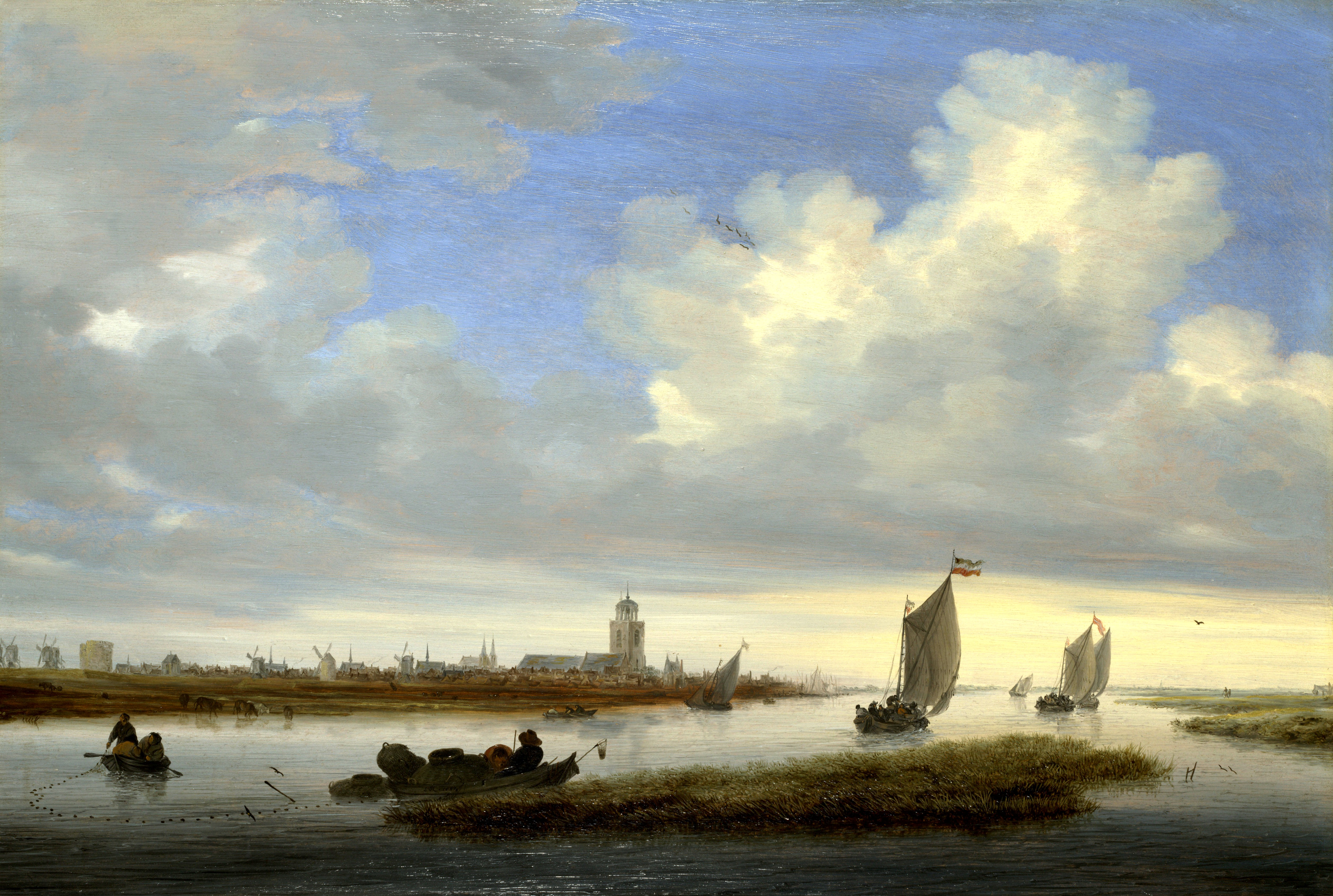
van Ruysdael – View of Deventer

- Nicolaes Maes – Portrait of Four Children
- Nicolas Poussin – The Flight into Egypt
- Salomon van Ruysdael – View of Deventer Seen from the North-West
- Diego Velázquez – Las Hilanderas (c.1657)
- Jan Vermeer – A Girl Asleep (c.1657)

== Births ==
- January - Pieter van Bloemen, Flemish painter (died 1720)
- May 8 – Martino Altomonte, Italian painter of frescoes (died 1745)
- October 4 - Francesco Solimena, Italian painter and draughtsman (died 1747)
- October 8 - Wigerus Vitringa, Dutch seascape painter (died 1725)
- date unknown
  - Gioseffo Maria Bartolini, Italian painter (died 1725)
  - Michiel Carree, Dutch painter (died 1727)
  - Louis de Boullogne, French painter and brother of Bon Boullogne (died 1733)
  - Giovanni Evangelista Draghi, Italian painter (died 1712)
  - Gregorio Lazzarini, Italian painter of religious, historical and mythological subjects (died 1730)
  - Pârvu Mutul, Romanian muralist and church painter (died 1735)
  - Giuseppe Nicola Nasini, Italian painter of frescoes, director of Grand-Ducal Academy for the Arts (died 1736)
  - Joseph Vivien, French painter (died 1735)

== Deaths ==
- February 7 - Cesare Dandini, Italian painter (born 1596)
- February 19 - Evert van Aelst, Dutch still life painter (born 1602)
- March 7 - Balthasar van der Ast, Dutch Golden Age painter who specialized in still lifes of flowers and fruit (born 1593/1594)
- April 29 - Jacques Stella, French painter (born 1596)
- June - Jan Antonisz van Ravesteyn, Dutch painter to the Dutch court in The Hague (born 1572)
- July - Luigi Baccio del Bianco, Italian architect, engineer, scenic designer and painter (born 1604)
- August 16 - Pieter Soutman, Dutch Golden Age painter (born 1580)
- August 19 - Frans Snyders, Flemish still-life master, apprenticed to Pieter II Brueghel (born 1579)
- September 13 - Jacob van Campen, Dutch artist and architect of the Golden Age (born 1597)
- October
  - David Bailly, Leiden artist (born 1584)
  - Hendrik Gerritsz Pot, Dutch painter (born 1580)
- November 29 - Raffaello Vanni, Italian painter for churches of the Baroque period (born 1590)
- date unknown
  - Bartholomeus Breenbergh, Dutch painter (born 1598)
  - Carlo Bozzoni, Italian painter of the Baroque period (born 1605)
  - Giovanni Paolo Oderico, Italian painter mainly active in Genoa (born 1613)
  - Clara Peeters, Flemish still life painter (born 1594)
  - Pieter van Schaeyenborgh, Dutch painter of fish still lifes (born 1600)
- victims of the Genoa plague
  - Giuseppe Badaracco, Italian painter (born 1588)
  - Bartolomeo Biscaino, Italian painter, active in his native Genoa (born 1632)
  - Giovanni Andrea Biscaino (father of Bartolomeo), Italian painter of landscapes (date of birth unknown)
  - Silvestro Chiesa, Italian painter (b. unknown)
  - Giovanni Battista Mainero, Italian painter from Genoa (born 1600)
  - Francesco Merano, Italian painter mainly active in his native Genoa (born 1619)
  - Giovanni Battista Monti, Italian painter of portraits (date of birth unknown)
  - Giovanni Battista Primi, Italian marine landscapes and portrait painter (date of birth unknown)
  - Giovanni Stefano Verdura, Italian painter of the Baroque period, mainly active in Genoa (date of birth unknown)
