= Johann Wilhelm Baur =

German engraver, etcher and miniature painter

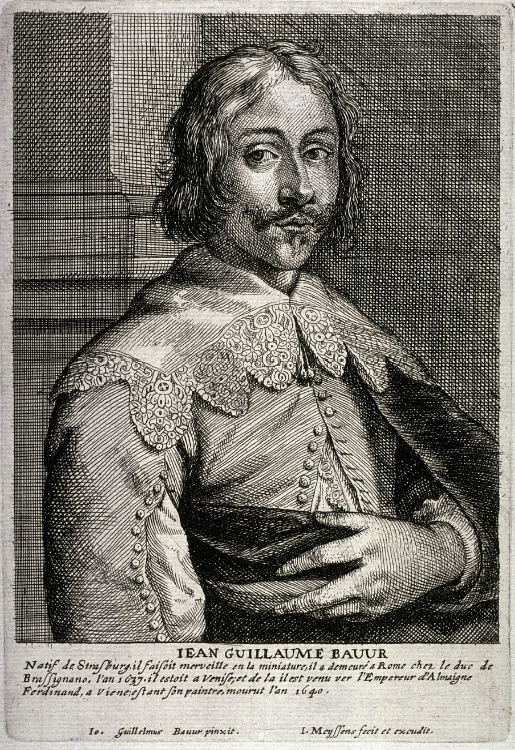
- Engraving by Jan Meyssens from a self-portrait.
- Born: Jean Guillaume; May 31, 1607; Strasbourg
- Died: January 1, 1640 (aged 32); Vienna
- Known for: Painting
- Movement: Baroque

Johann Wilhelm Baur, Joan Guiliam Bouwer, or Bauer (Strasbourg, 31 May 1607 - Vienna, 1 January 1640) was a German engraver, etcher and miniature painter. He is famous for a series of illustrations of Ovid's Metamorphoses.

== Biography ==
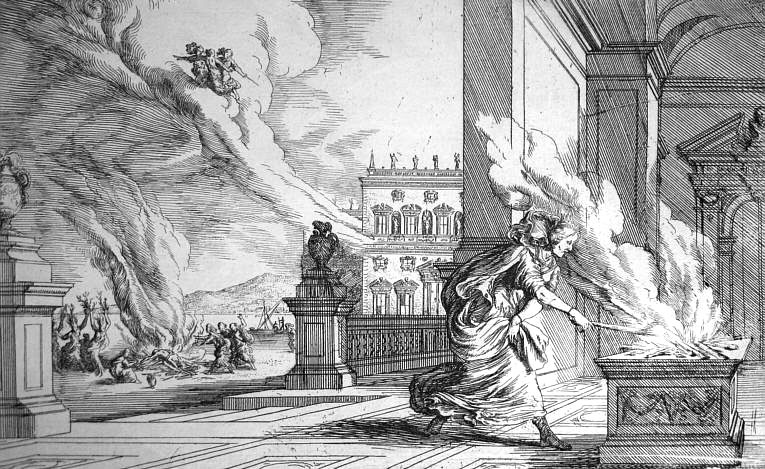
Baur's Althaea (from Greek mythology).

According to Houbraken, he learned to draw and paint from the miniaturist Friedrich Brentel in Strasbourg, before embarking on a Grand Tour to Rome, where he painted for Brassiano, a known patron of the arts. He specialized in watercolors of architectural follies in perspective, and for this reason was often employed to make pictures of gardens. He had the habit of talking when he was concentrating, and was known to have conversations with inanimate objects. In 1634 he broke off a trip to Naples to return to a woman in Rome. According to Cornelis de Bie, Baur lived with Karel Škréta (Carolus Creten) while he was in Rome. Creten was a member of the Bentvueghels with the nickname Slach-sweerd. The RKD has assigned this nickname Slagzwaard (longsword) to Baur himself, who was probably also a member of the Bentvueghels, but whose nickname was not recorded by De Bie.

Many of his drawings of Ovid's stories, the passion of Christ in 24 plates, and scenes of daily life in Rome (with costumes of various nationalities) were engraved by Melchior Küsel of Augsburg. He died in Vienna of a sudden illness while on a commission by Ferdinand III, Holy Roman Emperor.

== Sources ==
- Filippo Baldinucci's Artists in biographies by Filippo Baldinucci, 1610–1670, p. 197 Google books
