= Abbey of Sts. Justin and Clement =

- Badia dei Santi Giusto e Clemente
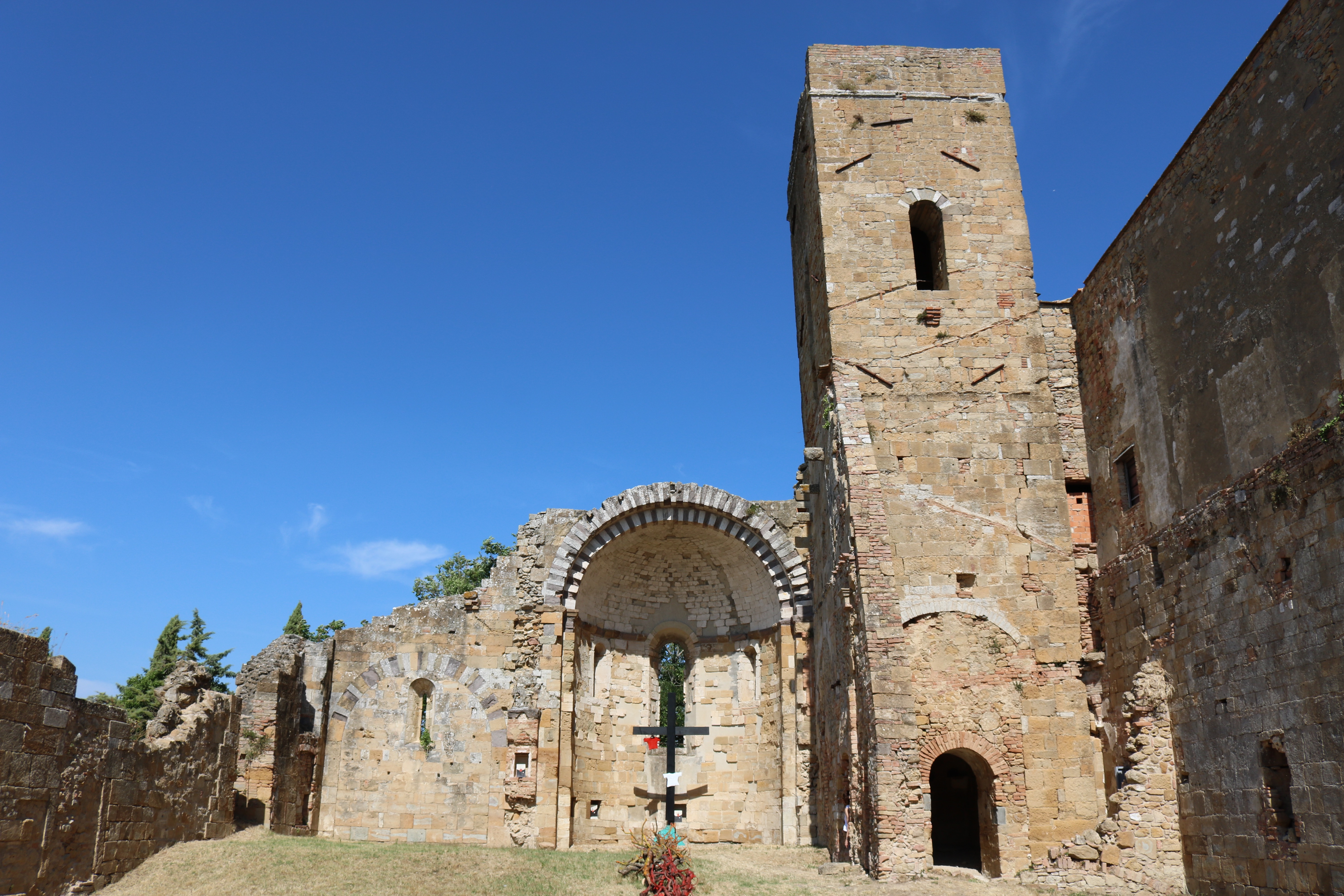
- Interactive map of Abbey of Sts. Justin and Clement

Monastery information
- Full name: Abbey of the Holy Savior and of Sts. Justin and Clement
- Other name: Badia Camaldolese di San Giusto
- Order: Benedictine (c. 1030-1113); Camaldolese (1113-1846)
- Established: c. 1030
- Disestablished: 1861
- Dedication: Saints Justin and Clement
- Diocese: Volterra
- Controlled churches: San Giusto

Architecture
- Functional status: dissolved
- Style: Romanesque
- Groundbreaking: c. 1030
- Completed date: 1034

Site
- Location: Volterra, Pisa, Italy
- Coordinates: 43.4158°N 10.8505°E
- Visible remains: church facade and chancel

The Abbey of the Holy Savior and of Sts. Justin and Clement (Italian: Badia dei Santi Giusto e Clemente), also known as the Camaldolese Abbey of St. Justin (Italian: Badia Camaldolese di San Giusto), is a former Italian monastery in the city of Volterra, Pisa, which was founded in the 11th century. It was a major religious institution of the region until it was initially abandoned by the monks due to earthquake damage in the 19th century and then taken over and dissolved under the Risorgimento movement for the political unification of the Italian peninsula. For most of its history, it operated as a monastery of Camaldolese monks.

== Origins ==
The site of the abbey was the shrine housing the remains of Justin and Clement, two African Christians, possibly brothers, who, according to tradition, had arrived in Volterra in AD 537 as refugees from the invasion of their homeland by the Visigoths. They soon began to preach the orthodox Christian faith to the local populace there, many of whom were adherents of Arianism. After successfully leading a resistance to the siege of the Ostrogoth king, Totila, Justin was declared the first Catholic bishop of the city. Clement was made a priest under his rule. After their deaths, the two religious leaders became venerated as patron saints of the city.

According to tradition, the first religious structures on the site were two chapels built at the burial sites of the saints during the second half of the 6th century. After the destruction of these original chapels, during the Lombard invasions, they were rebuilt and expanded at the end of the 7th century by the head of the guilds of the city, named Alchis.

Around the year 1030, the complex was completely renovated by Gunfredus of Novara, the bishop of the city, in an effort to renew devotion to those saints. At that time, he replaced the two chapels with a larger church, known as San Giusto al Botro. At that same time, he founded a Benedictine monastery on nearby Monte Nibbio, under the dedication of the Holy Savior (Italian: Badia di San Salvatore) to which he entrusted the care of the Church of Sts. Justin and Clement, in addition to their monastic church.

== Camaldolese era ==
In 1113, the monks of St. Justin joined the Camaldolese Order. About 1340, Abbot Fazio of Ravenna hired painters from the School of Giotto to do a series of paintings in both the shrine church and the abbey church. In 1485, however, the monks lost their independence as Abbot Giusto di Gherardo Buonvici surrendered control of the monastery to Cardinal Giovanni di Medici, who later became Pope Leo X. During this subsequent period, the monks came under the rule of a commendatory abbot, who was not a member of the monastery or even a monk.

Mario Maffei, brother of Raffaele Maffei and a member of a notable family of the city, was named commendatory abbot in 1515. Both he and his successor, Giovanni Battista Riccobaldi del Bava, began a number of renovation projects to restore the monastery. This work lasted from about 1520-1550. With this project, they began to embellish and expand the monastic complex, starting with the cloister of the monastery, which was rebuilt according to the design of the noted Florentine architect, Bartolomeo Ammannati. This was followed by a major renovation of the refectory, where the monks had their meals, under the hands of master stonecutters Bartolomeo Sandrini of Fiesole and Cosimo da Volterra. They restored the damage caused to the chamber during the period of 1530-1532 when the monks were forced to flee the abbey due to a siege of the city by the Republic of Florence. Del Bava ended the commendatory abbacy in 1562, returning control of the monastery to the Camaldolese Order.

In 1597, the refectory was further embellished with a large series of frescoes painted by Donato Mascagni depicting the lives of the patron saints of the house.

In the following century, the monks began work on the shrine church to which the monastery was attached, which was to become known as San Giusto Nuovo (the New St. Justin Church). The architect for this new monastic church is generally credited to have been Giovanni Coccapani.

In 1808, under the Napoleonic occupation of northern Italy, the abbey was suppressed, as part of the general closure of religious houses under French rule. In 1816, however, after the fall of the First French Empire, the Camaldolese were able to retake possession of the monastery. It was abandoned, however, after an earthquake devastated the abbey in 1846, and, seeing the decrepit state of the complex, with the fear of further earthquake damage and pressure from the political scene, the monks left the abbey and moved to the former monastery of the Friars Minor in the city. The monastery was definitively lost to the Catholic Church after Italian unification. In 1866, the land and buildings of the abbey were acquired by the Kingdom of Italy, which sold some of them to private parties and rented other portions.

With the continued deterioration of the buildings, and partial collapse due to earthquakes, the property passed back and forth between the Italian government and the City of Volterra. Currently the property is mostly owned and cared for by the Cassa di Risparmio of Volterra.
