= Borsboom =

Borsboom is a Dutch surname. It is a hypercorrected form of the toponymic surname Bosboom, meaning "forest tree".

Notable people with these surnames include:

Borsboom

- Denny Borsboom (born 1973), Dutch psychologist
- Matthieu Borsboom (born 1959), Dutch naval officer

Bosboom

- Anna Louisa Geertruida Bosboom-Toussaint (1812–1886), Dutch novelist
- Johannes Bosboom (1817–1891), Dutch painter and watercolorist
- Simon Bosboom (1614–1662), Dutch painter
- Tea Bosboom-Lanchava (born 1974), Dutch-Georgian chess player

== See also ==
- nl:Bosboom
