= Gonnelli =

Gonnelli is an Italian surname. Notable people with the surname include:

- Giovanni Gonnelli (1603–1664), Italian sculptor
- Lorenzo Gonnelli (born 1993), Italian footballer
- Tullio Gonnelli (1912–2005), Italian athlete
