= Sant'Andrea Apostolo, Volterra =

Church building and seminary in Volterra, Italy

Sant'Andrea Apostolo
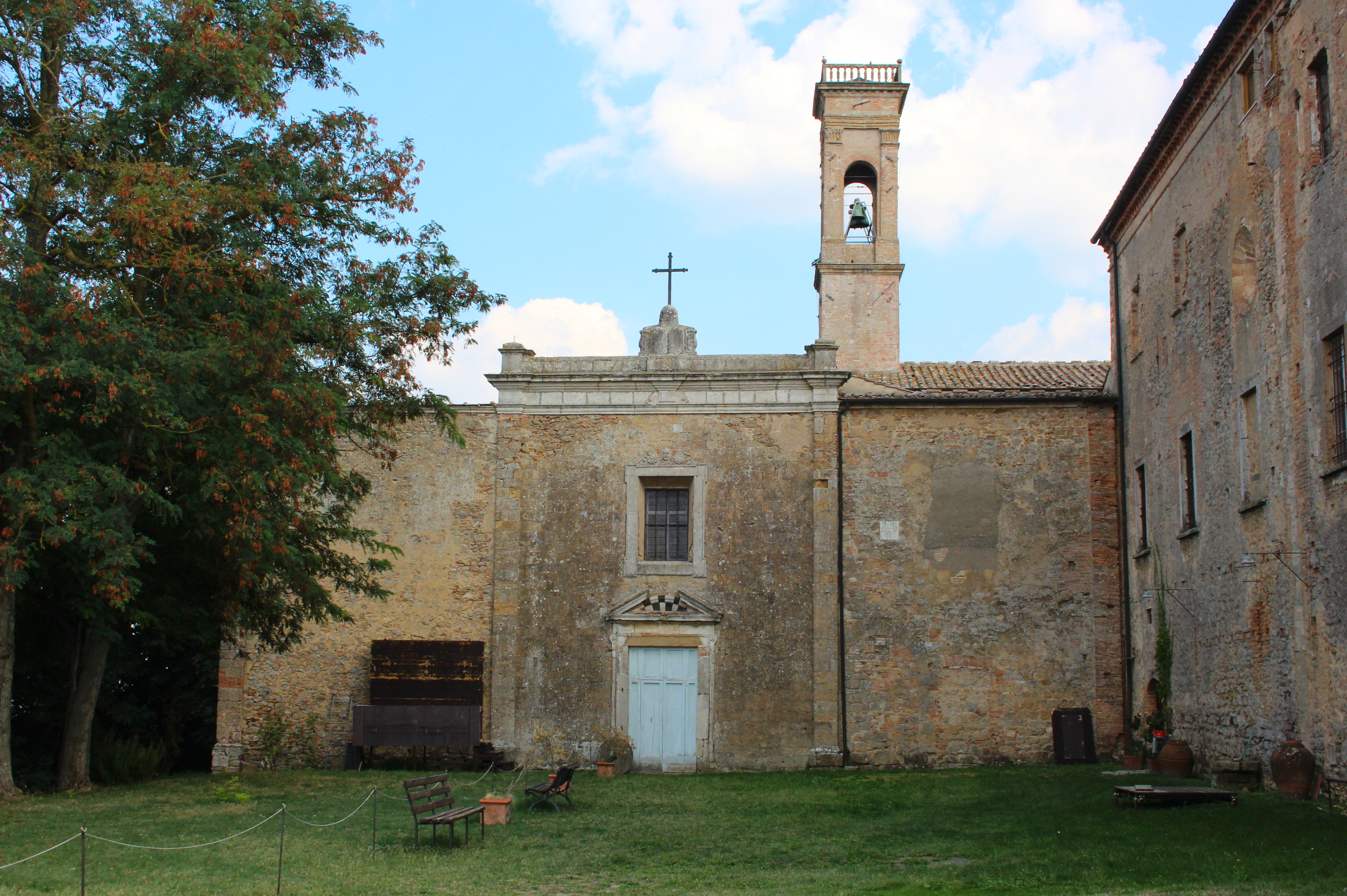
- View of church facade, with former monastery on right

Religion
- Affiliation: Roman Catholic
- Province: Pisa

Location
- Location: Viale Vittorio Veneto #2, Volterra, Italy
- Interactive map of Sant'Andrea Apostolo
- Coordinates: 43.40412°N 10.86683°E

Architecture
- Type: Church and monastery

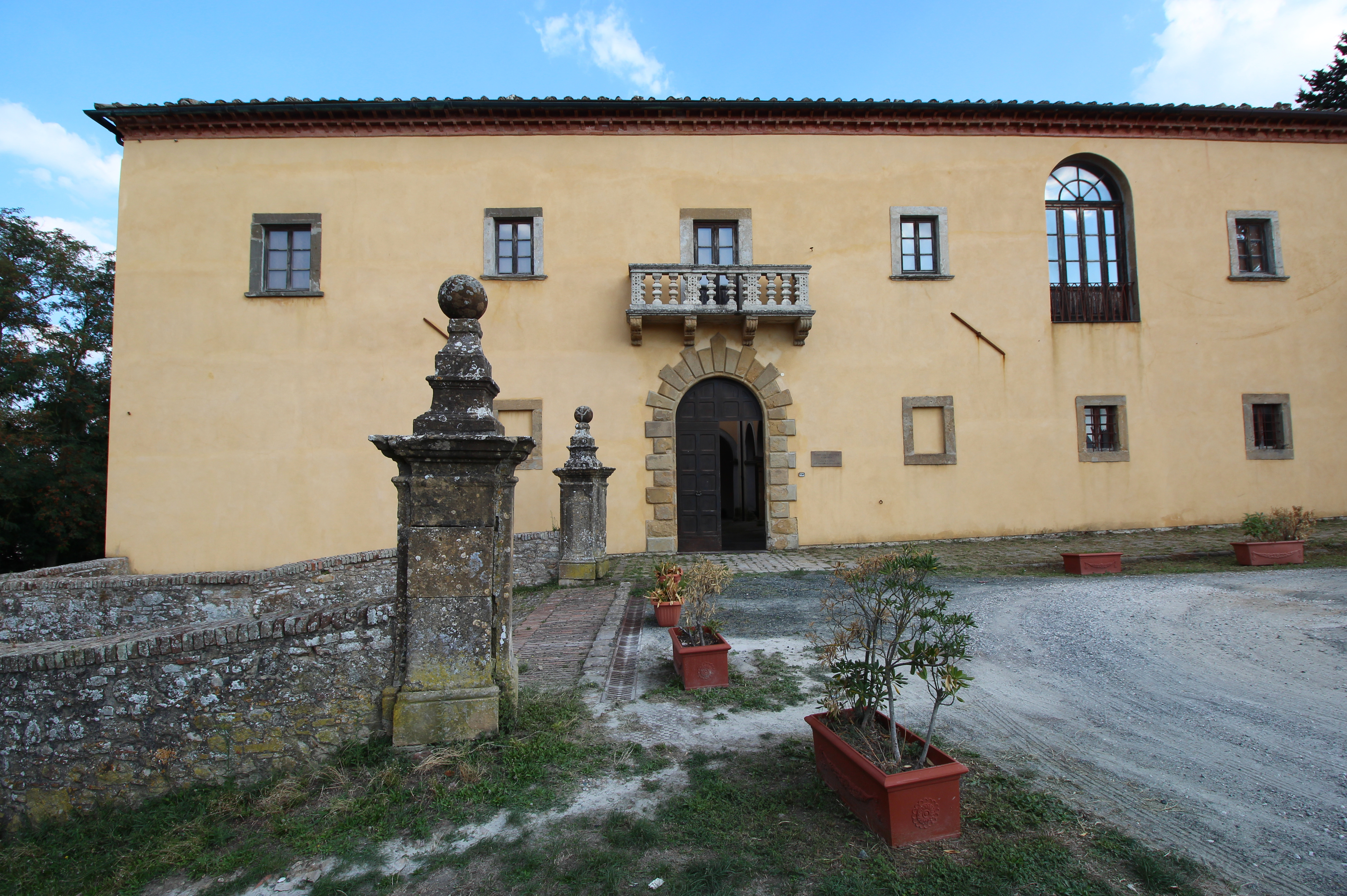
Seminary of Volterra

Sant'Andrea Apostolo (St Andrew the Apostle) is a Baroque-style, Roman Catholic church and monastery located just outside the walls of Volterra in the province of Pisa, region of Tuscany, Italy. The complex now serves as a seminary.

== Description ==
A pieve or rural parish church called Sant'Andrea in Postierla is documented since 1170. In 1339, commissioned by the Bishop Ranuccio Allegretti, an Olivetan monastery was built atop the old etruscan walls on this site. They remained in the monastery till it was closed in 1783, by order of the Grand-Duke Leopold, and transferred to become the Seminario Vescovile. The seminary, founded in 1704, had previously been located in the Palazzo Incontri on the Piazza Maggiore.

A small church is attached to convent, but many of the artworks have been moved including to the Diocesan museum of Volterra, now in the church of Sant'Agostino. In 1767, Bishop Jacopo Gaetano Inghirami consecrated the church. In a survey from 1832, the church had two canvases (1698) flanking the entrance depicting Miracles of the blessed Bernardo Tolomei, founder of the Olivetan order, painted by Giovanni Battista Maioli. A side altarpiece depicting Santa Francesca Romana was painted Vanni senior. The side altarpiece depicting the Presentation at the temple was painted by Arrighi and Baldassarre Franceschini. There was a canvas altarpiece depicting the blessed Bernardo Tolomei by Giovanni Morari. Flanking the main altar were canvases depicting the Martyrdom of St Andrew Apostle and St Peter crossing the Sea by Giuseppe Arrighi. The chapel dedicated to the Holy Heart of Jesus had a alabaster ciborium (1574).
