= Church of San Giusto, Volterra =

Church of Saints Justin and Clement
- Church of San Giusto Nuovo
- Chiesa dei Santi Giusto e Clemente
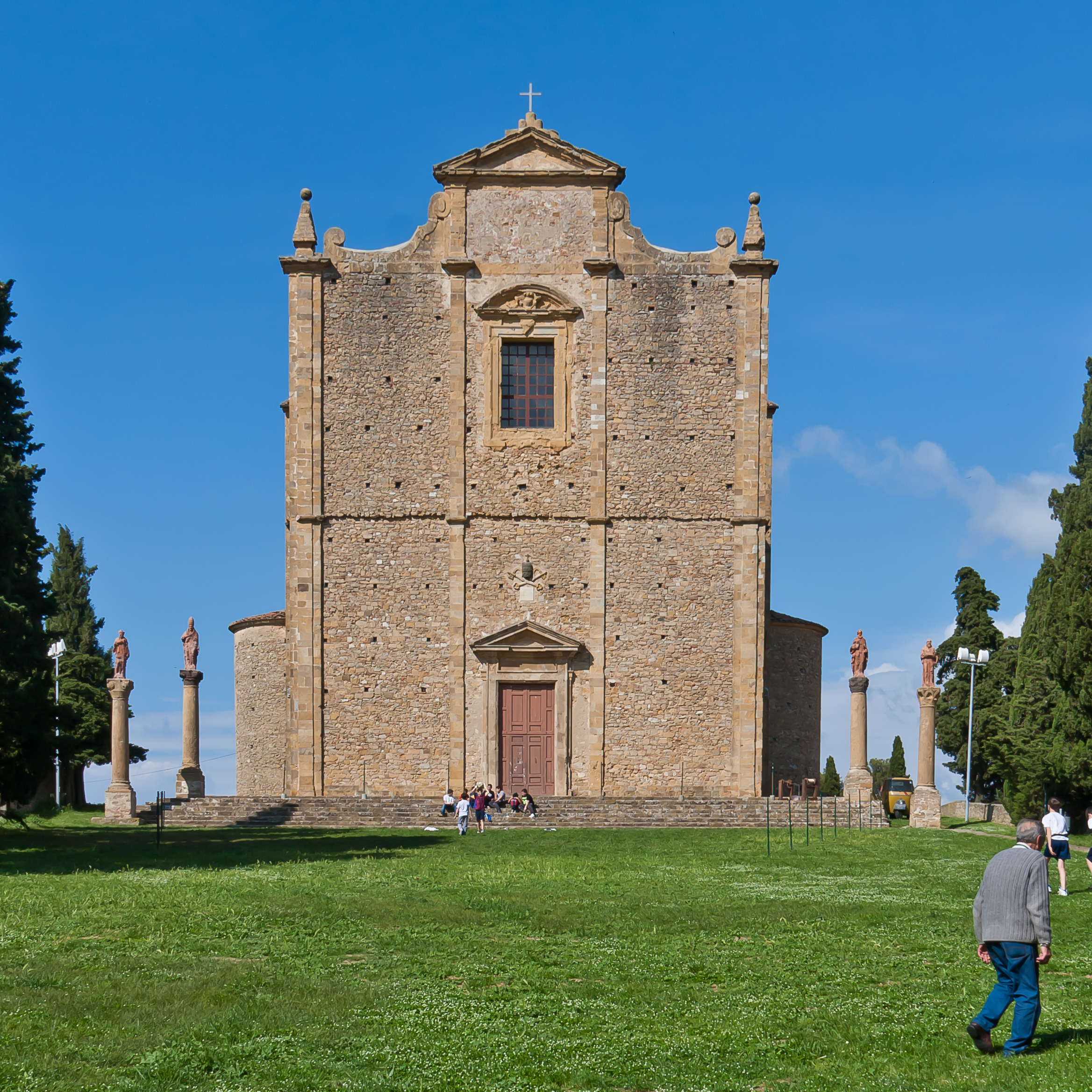
- Church of Saints Justin and Clement
- 43°24′39″N 10°51′03″E
- Location: Piazzale XXV Aprile, Volterra, Pisa
- Country: Italy
- Denomination: Roman Catholic Church
- Religious institute: Benedictine (c. 1030-1113); Camaldolese (1113-1808); Benedictine (1816-1846)

History
- Founded: 6th century
- Dedication: Saints Justin and Clement
- Consecrated: 1775

Architecture
- Functional status: museum
- Architect(s): Giovanni Coccapani (design) and Ludovico Incontri (completion)
- Architectural type: Church
- Style: Renaissance
- Groundbreaking: October 28, 1628
- Completed: 1775

The Church of Santi Giusto e Clemente (Saints Justin and Clement) is a Roman Catholic church in Volterra, Pisa, region of Tuscany, Italy. It is also known as San Giusto or San Giusto Nuovo. For some 850 years, the church was affiliated to an adjacent Benedictine monastery, the Abbey of Sts. Justin and Clement, which is no longer extant.

== History ==
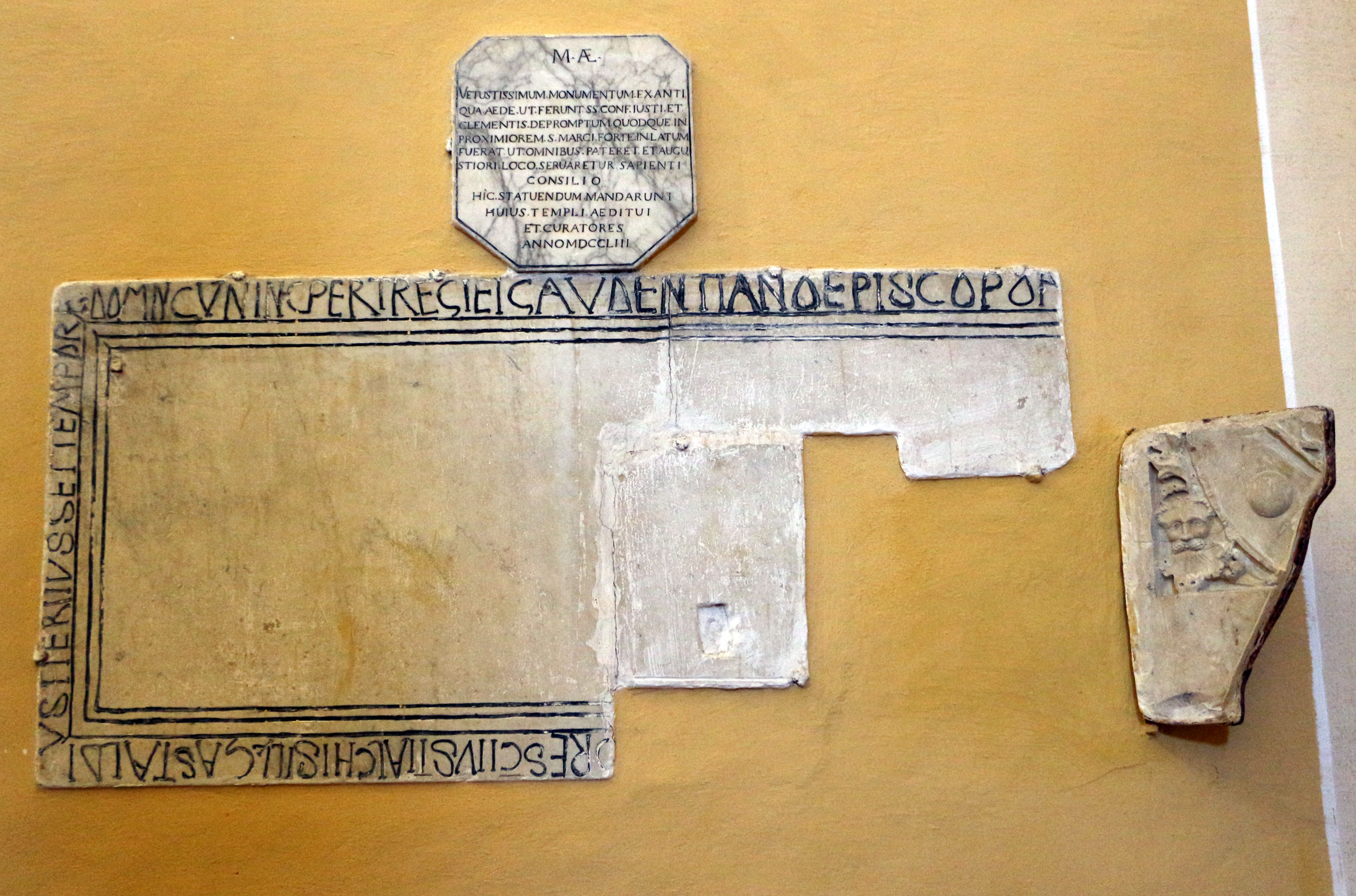
Marble slate with the name of Cunipert

An ancient church on the site, built at least by the 7th century, called San Giusto in Botro, was built over the tombs of Saints Justin and Clement, two African Christians, possibly brothers, who, according to tradition, had arrived in Volterra in AD 537 as refugees from the invasion of their homeland by the Visigoths. They soon began to preach the orthodox Christian faith to the local populace there, many of whom were adherents of Arianism. After successfully leading a resistance to the siege of the Ostrogoth king, Totila, Justin was declared the first Catholic bishop of the city. Clement was made a priest under his rule.

According to tradition, the first religious structures were two chapels built at the burial sites of the saints during the second half of the 6th century. After the destruction of these original chapels occurring during the Lombard invasions, an effort to rebuild and expand those buildings was done at the end of the 7th century. The complex was completely renovated around the year AD 1000 as part of a Benedictine monastery.

The ancient church and the surrounding structures had suffered from the erosion of this neighborhood (known as the Balze of Volterra). Construction of the present stone church was begun on October 28, 1628, based on designs by the architect Giovanni Coccapani, which were carried out by his pupil Ludovico Incontri. The new church was consecrated in 1775. In front of the church facade, atop columns putatively deriving from the ancient church are statues (also putatively from the ancient church) depicting the patron saints of Volterra.

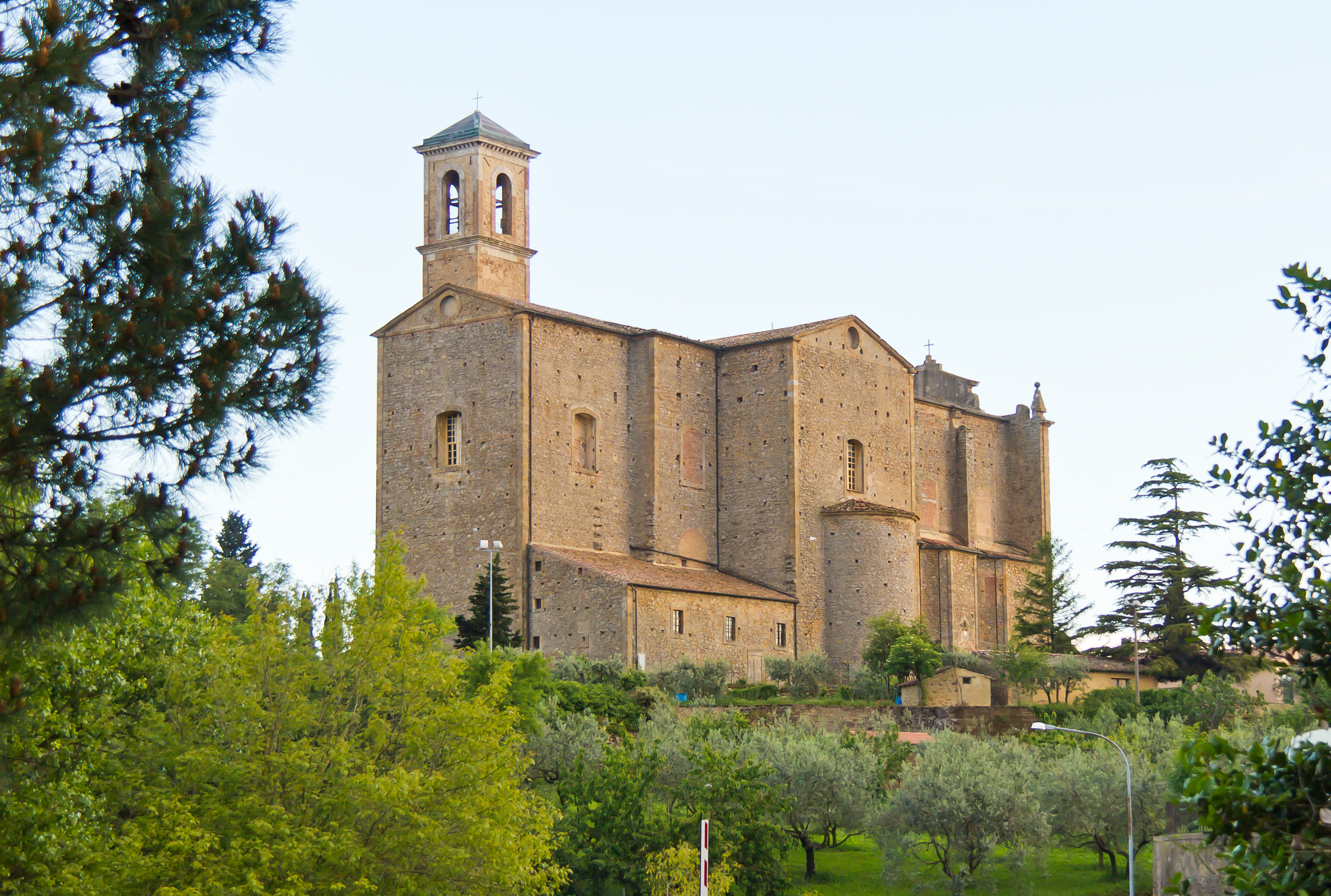
Chiesa dei Santi Giusto e Clemente

The interior is notable for the height of its single barrel-vaulted nave. Along the nave are six side altars. The first altar on the right depicts a Visitation of the Virgin with, above, Angels upholding a Eucharist painted by Cosimo Daddi. The second altar on the right depicts a Sermon of St Francis Xavier by Giovanni Domenico Ferretti. The depiction seems odd, since the 16th century Jesuit missionary to India, Japan and China, appears to preach to an elegant crowd of Ancient Romans. The third altarpiece on the right depicts the Martyrdom of Saints Attinia and Greciniana painted circa 1642 by Giuseppe Arrighi. The second altar on the left has an altarpiece depicting Martyrdom of St Ursula and the Virgins by Pietro Dandini. The third altar on the left has a painting within a painting, depicting Four Saints in Adoration of the Madonna and Child by Neri di Bicci painted by Cesare Dandini. The painting of the Madonna delle Grazie (1451), by Neri di Bicci, originally in this church is now housed in the Diocesan Museum of Sacred Art in Volterra.

Gated inside the choir, the church contains an ancient altar, with a marble cover formerly over the tomb of St Justin, inscribed with the names of Cunincpert, 7th-century king of the Lombards, and the steward of the bishop Gaudenziano Alchis, founder of the first temple dedicated to San Giusto. Placed in an urn on the altar are the relics of the evangelists and martyrs, Carissimo, Dolcissimo and Crescenzio, with 17th-century statues by Francesco Franchi. A chapel houses a canvas painting of Elijah asleep (1631) by Baldassarre Franceschini.
