= Leonaert Bramer =

Dutch painter (1596 – c. 1674)

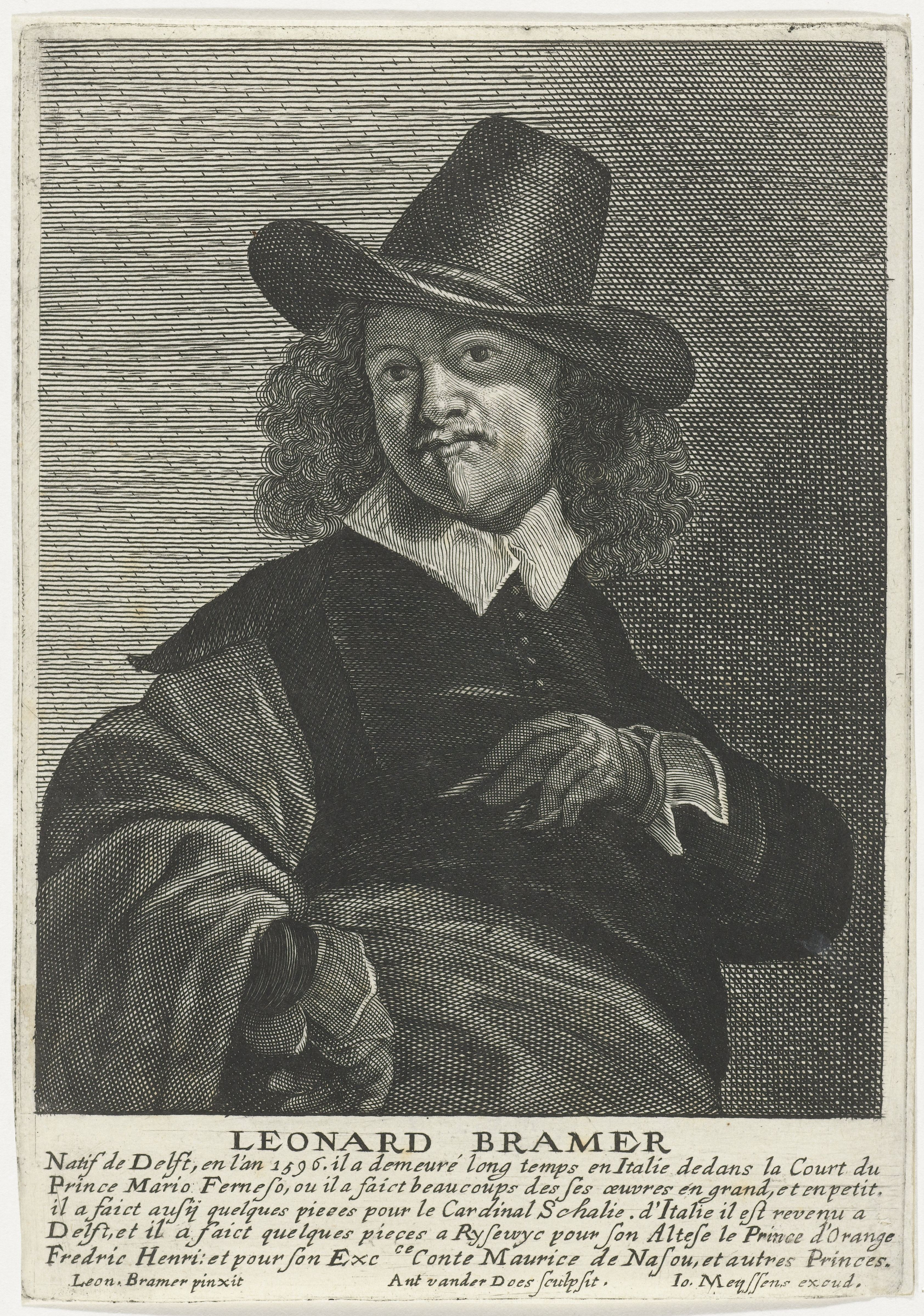
- Bramer in Het Gulden Cabinet, engraved by Antony van der Does
- Born: 24 December 1596; Delft, County of Holland, Dutch Republic
- Died: before 10 February 1674 (aged 77); Delft, County of Holland, Dutch Republic
- Known for: Painting, drawing

Leonaert Bramer, also Leendert or Leonard (24 December 1596 – before 10 February 1674 (date of burial)), was a Dutch painter known primarily for genre, religious, and history paintings. Very prolific as a painter and draftsman, he is noted especially for nocturnal scenes which show a penchant for exotic details of costume and setting. He also painted frescos—a rarity north of the Alps—which have not survived, as well as murals on canvas, few of which are extant. Bramer is one of the most intriguing personalities in seventeenth-century Dutch art.

== Life ==
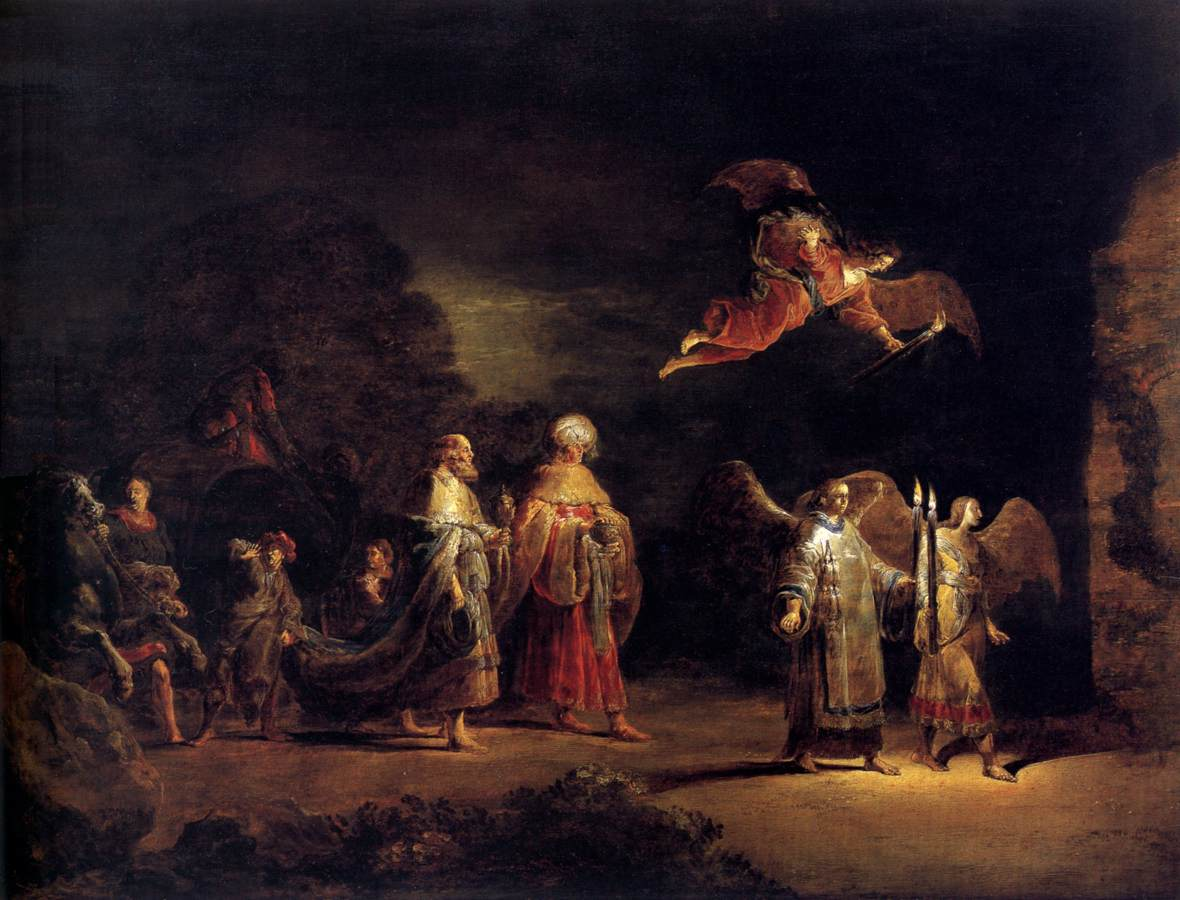
The Magi going to Bethlehem

Bramer was born in Delft. In 1614, at the age of 18, he left on a long trip eventually reaching Rome in 1616, via Atrecht, Amiens, Paris, Aix (February 1616), Marseille, Genoa, and Livorno. In Rome he was one of the founders of the Bentvueghels group of Northern artists, and was nicknamed "Nestelghat" (Fidget). He lived with Wouter Crabeth and got into a fight with Claude Lorrain. He dedicated a poem to Wybrand de Geest. Bramer lived in Rome intermittently until October 1627, visiting Mantua and Venice, often for deliveries and to meet Domenico Fetti. In Italy Bramer acquired the sobriquet 'Leonardo della Notte' or 'Leonardo delle Notti' ('Leonardo of the night' or 'nights').

By 1628 he was back in Delft, where he joined the Guild of Saint Luke in 1629 and the schutterij. Among his many patrons were members of the House of Orange, but local burgomasters and schepen also bought his paintings in great numbers. He was a many sided artist, designing for tapestry firms in Delft, painting murals and ceilings, some of which are illusionistic in style. He painted real frescos in the Civic Guard house, the nearby stadholder's palaces in Honselersdijk, Rijswijk, the Communal Land Housde and the Prinsenhof in Delft. Due to the Dutch climate they no longer survive. In 1648 Bramer travelled to Rome for a second time.

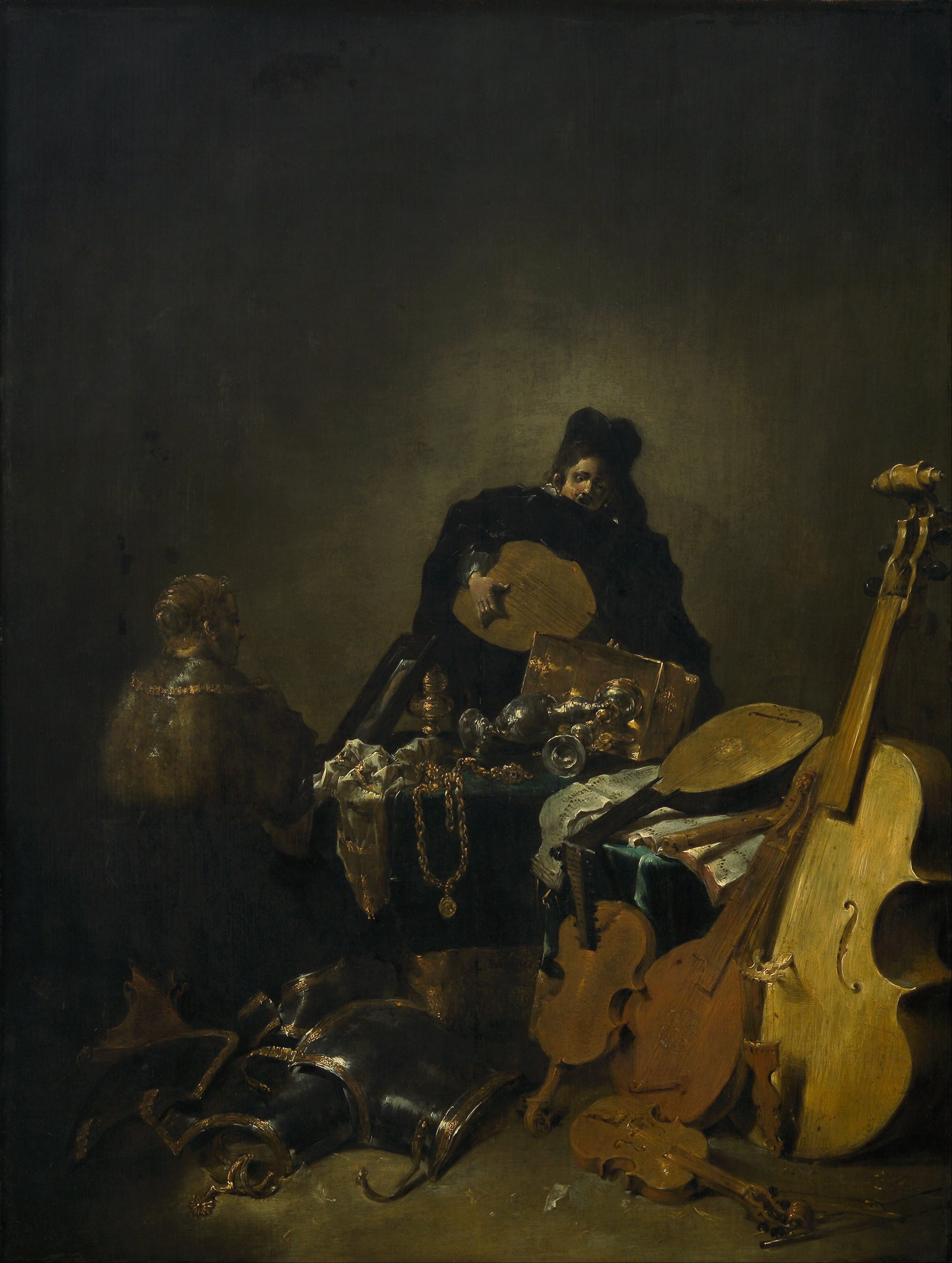
Allegory of Vanity (Vanitas)

He evidently knew the greatest of his Delft contemporaries, Johannes Vermeer, as he came to the latter's defence when his future mother-in-law was trying to prevent him from marrying her daughter.

On the evening of 4 April 1653, Leonaert Bramer, a Roman Catholic himself, and a Protestant sea captain, Bartholomeus Melling, called on Maria Thins. They had with them a Delft lawyer named Johannes Ranck. This party had come to convince Maria Thins that the young up-and-coming artist was a good match for her beloved daughter Catharina. Maria's sister was also present giving support and sympathy. "The visitors had come to ask Maria to sign a document permitting the marriage vows to be published. Maria replied that she would not sign such an act of consent. Despite this – a subtle distinction – she would put up with the vows being published: she said several times that she wouldn't stand in the way of this. In other words, she didn't welcome the marriage, but she wouldn't block it.

It is possible that Vermeer received his artistic training from Bramer, although there is no documentation for this, and Bramer's dark and exotic style is unlike Vermeer's.

A lifelong bachelor, Bramer remained very productive until his death, which occurred in his home town of Delft in 1674.

== Work ==
Bramer showed in his choice of subjects a preference for Italian rather than Dutch artistic practice. His subjects are usually mythological, allegorical, historical or biblical scenes (such as the Denial of St Peter, Rijksmuseum, Amsterdam). He stayed away from typical Dutch themes such as landscapes, still lifes, portraits and genre pieces and he rarely painted Italianate pastoral scenes popular with the Utrecht Caravaggisti.

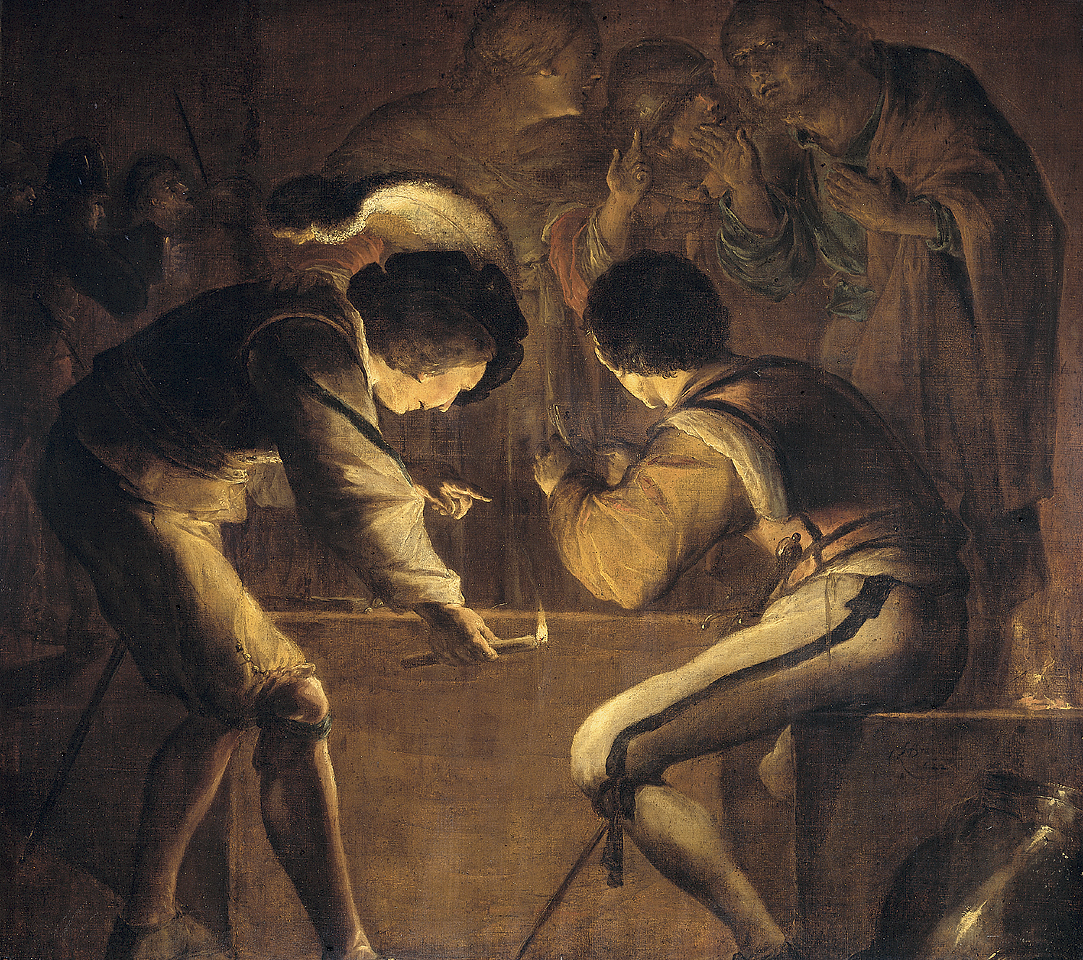
Denial of St Peter, 1642, Rijksmuseum

His style is nervous, but his technique, painting the reflection of light, is very good. His famous "Album Bramer" (drawn between 1642 and 1654, now in Leiden) contains many sketches after paintings in Delft collections. He was influenced by Adam Elsheimer, and the fresco painter Agostino Tassi. Upon his death, his works were offered for sale in 1674 in an advertisement in the Haarlems Dagblad, probably necessary because of the (depressed) Dutch economy:

May 3rd, 1674

Op Maendagh, den 7 Mey 1674. sal men tot Delft, op de St. Lucas Gilde-Kamer, verkoopen veel treffelijcke Schilderyen, en oock veel treffelijcke raere Kunst en Teyckeningen, soo op Paneel, Doeck als Kopere Platen, als oock verscheyde groote Boecken, vol Konst-werck: naergelaten van den vermaerden Schilder ende Teyckenaer Leendert Bramer Zal:.

Translation: On Monday, the 7th of May 1674, the Guild of St. Luke in Delft shall sell many good paintings, and many good and rare art and drawings, on panel, canvas, and copper plates, as well as diverse large books, full of art work: left by the very respected painter and draftsman, the late Leendert Bramer.

Among his drawings, probably the most puzzling set are those he titled "Straatwerken," meaning "street works." From his inventory it is clear that the Flemish merchant and art collector Gaspar Roomer who resided in Naples owned 1500 drawings by Bramer.

== Sources ==
- Haak, B. (2003) Hollandse schilders in de Gouden Eeuw, p. 324.
- Bramer, L., & Goldsmith, J. T. B. (1994). Leonaert Bramer: 1596–1674; ingenious painter and draughtsman in Rome and Delft; [monografie bij de tentoonstelling gehouden te Delft, van 9 September – 13 November 1994]. Zwolle: Waanders. ISBN 9040097046
- Liedtke, W. (2007) Dutch paintings in The Metropolitan Museum of Art, p. 87–89.
- Liedtke, W. A., Plomp, M., Rüger, A., Metropolitan Museum of Art (New York, N.Y.), & National Gallery (Great Britain). (2001). Vermeer and the Delft school. New York: Metropolitan Museum of Art. ISBN 0870999737
- Rijksmuseum (Amsterdam). (2007). Dutch paintings of the seventeenth century in the Rijksmuseum Amsterdam: Vol. 1. (Dutch paintings of the seventeenth century in the Rijksmuseum Amsterdam.) Amsterdam: Rijksmuseum. ISBN 9789086890279
- Vermeer, J., Duparc, F. J., Wheelock, A. K., Mauritshuis (Hague, Netherlands), & National Gallery of Art (U.S.). (1995). Johannes Vermeer. Washington: National Gallery of Art. ISBN 0300065582
- Filippo Baldinucci's Artists in biographies by Filippo Baldinucci, 1610–1670, p. 197 Internet Archive
