= Donato Mascagni =

Italian painter

Fresco from the cycle Stories of Sts. Justin and Clement, Abbey of Sts. Justin and Clement, Volterra

Donato Mascagni (1579–10 March 1637) was an Italian painter of the Renaissance active in Florence, Volterra, Rome, Mugello, and Salzburg.

== Biography ==
Born in Florence in 1579, Mascagni was a pupil of Jacopo Ligozzi. He is also known as Fra or Frate Arsenio because he joined the Servite Order in 1605. He however obtained special dispensation through cardinal Girolamo Bernerio to move to Florence and become a priest in 1609. His income from painting was used to support his family. Mascagni carried out a lot of work for churches in Florence and for the Servite monastery to which he belonged. He also worked for monasteries in Valladolid in Spain at the beginning of the 17th century. He painted a fresco depicting the Wedding at Cana (1593) for the Sala dei Consiglio of the Palazzo dei Priori, Volterra and worked on the frescoes at the Quirinal Palace. After much travelling, he returned to Florence in 1630.
