= Simon Bosboom =

Dutch Golden Age architect and writer

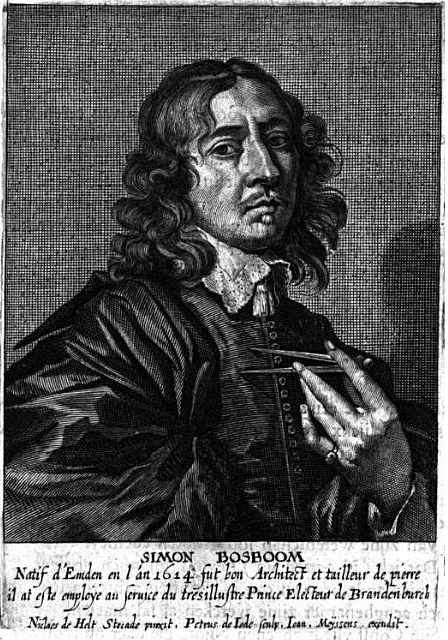
Portrait engraved by Pieter de Jode II after Nicolaes de Helt Stockade for Het Gulden Cabinet.

Simon Bosboom (1614, Emden – 1662, Amsterdam), was a Dutch Golden Age architect and writer.

== Biography ==
He was active as an architect in England and Germany, before working on an almshouse for the city council of Nijmegen in 1640., His son Dirk, who later became an engraver, was born in Nijmegen in 1641. Bosboom moved to Amsterdam when he was hired as a master mason to assist Jacob van Campen for his work as city architect of Amsterdam. He helped him with the City Hall of Amsterdam, his largest city project. In 1653 he was promoted to city mason after the dismissal of Willem de Keyser, and in 1657, the year of Van Campen's death, Bosboom was promoted to city architect.

Just as Hubertus Quellinus had done for the city hall in 1665, Bosboom published a small instructional booklet on architecture with engravings after Vincenzo Scamozzi entitled "Cort onderwys van de Vyf Colommen"; or Short instruction on the five columns (Doric, Ionic, Corinthian, Tuscan, Composite). His book earned him an honorary place in Cornelis de Bie's book of artists. He wrote that he helped Jacob van Campen and Artus Quellinus with decorations for the City Hall of Amsterdam, built in 1649-1653.

His book became a popular handbook for architects that was reprinted several times and served to spread the ideas of Scamozzi throughout the Netherlands.
