= Giovanni Battista Baiardo =

Italian painter

Giovanni Battista Baiardo (died 1657) was an Italian painter of the Baroque period.

He was mainly active in Genoa as a painter of religious and historical canvases. He painted the St. Helen prays to cross for the Genoese church of Santa Croce e San Camillo de Lellis. His name is also written as Giovanni Battista Bajardo.
