= Giovanni Gonnelli =

Italian sculptor

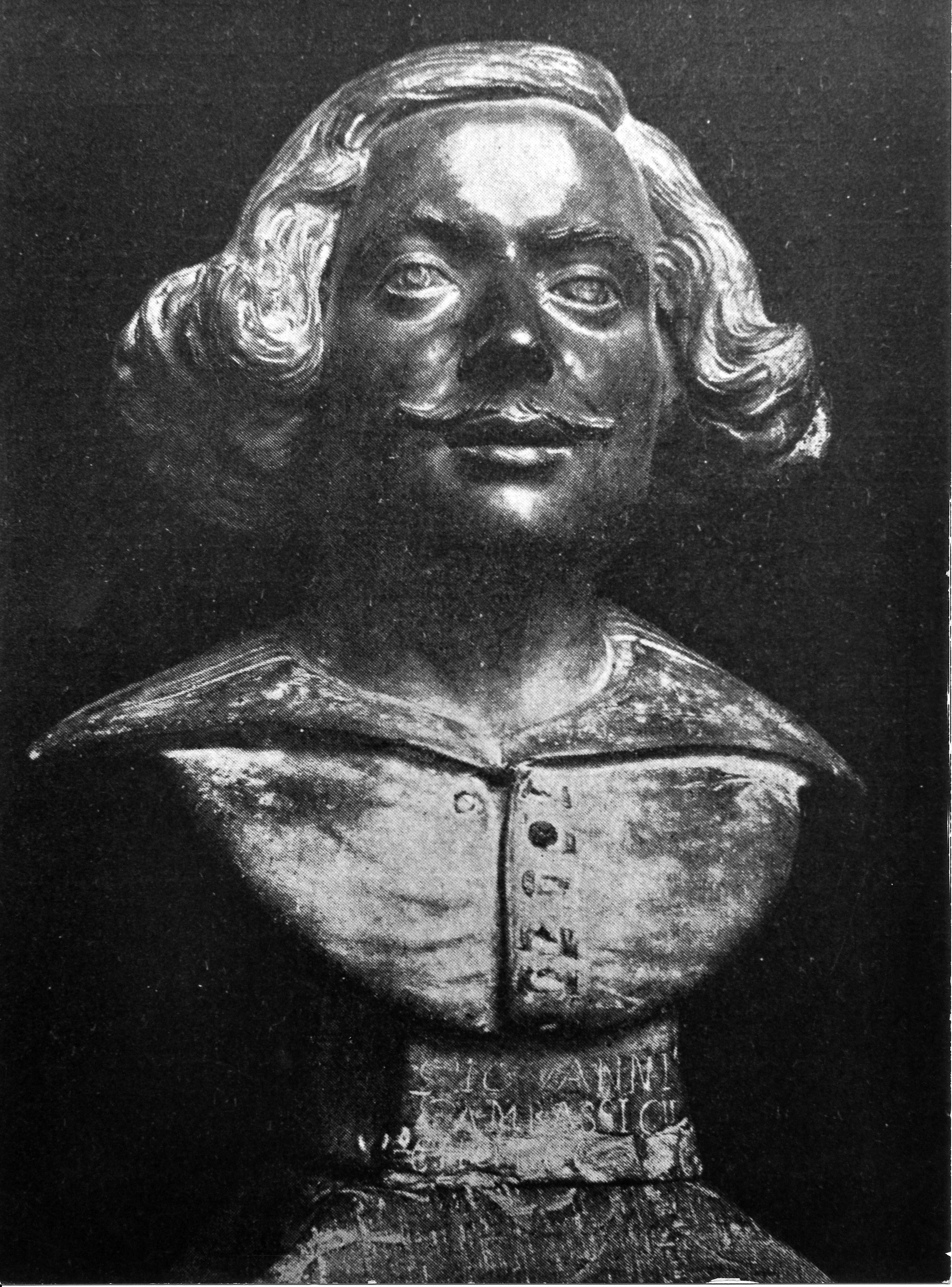
- Self-portrait
- Born: 4 April 1603; Gambassi, Grand Duchy of Tuscany
- Died: 1664 (aged 60–61); Rome, Papal States
- Other name: il Cieco da Gambassi
- Education: Pietro Tacca
- Known for: Painting
- Movement: Baroque

Signature
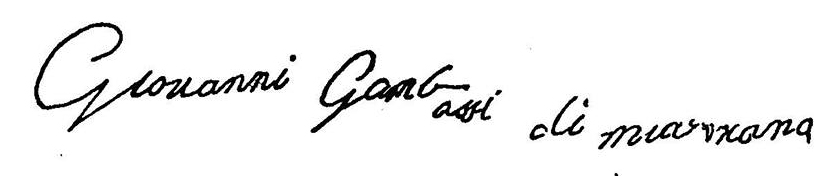

Giovanni Gonnelli, also known as il Cieco da Gambassi ("The blindman from Gambassi"; April 4, 1603 – 1664) was an Italian sculptor of the Baroque period, born in Tuscany. He is one of the biographies featured by Filippo Baldinucci.

== Blindness ==
The son of a glassmaker, he studied under the sculptor Pietro Tacca in Florence. According to Baldinucci, he was discovered in the studio of Tacca by the duke of Mantua, Charles I Gonzaga. While in the service of the Duke, he was trapped in Mantua during the Austrian siege of 1630 and somehow he was blinded. According to Filippo Baldinucci, a contemporary and acquaintance of Gonnelli’s, his blindness was due to the hardships endured during the siege, not to any accident.

Deprived of his livelihood, Gonnelli returned home and spent several unproductive years there. After a spell of melancholy, he began to sculpt again in clay. According to Baldinucci, his first completed work was a bust of Charles I Gonzaga, begun from life ten years earlier. In time he regained his confidence and began to accept commissions. He aroused accolades and patronage from the likes of the Grand Duke of Tuscany, Ferdinando II de' Medici and Pope Urban VIII.

Gonnelli’s surviving works include reliefs of the Nativity (Casole, Santa Maria Assunta) and the Pietà (Borgo di Colle, Santa Croce and San Bernardino all’Osservanza) and a statue of St. Stephen (Florence, Santo Stefano al Ponte), which was mentioned by Baldinucci. Because of his blindness, Gonnelli’s works were made of malleable materials such as wax and clay and were often covered with a monochrome varnish rather than painted, as was more typical of the 17th century. He is considered to be one of the last of the school of Giovanni della Robbia and to represent the provincial Italian Baroque.

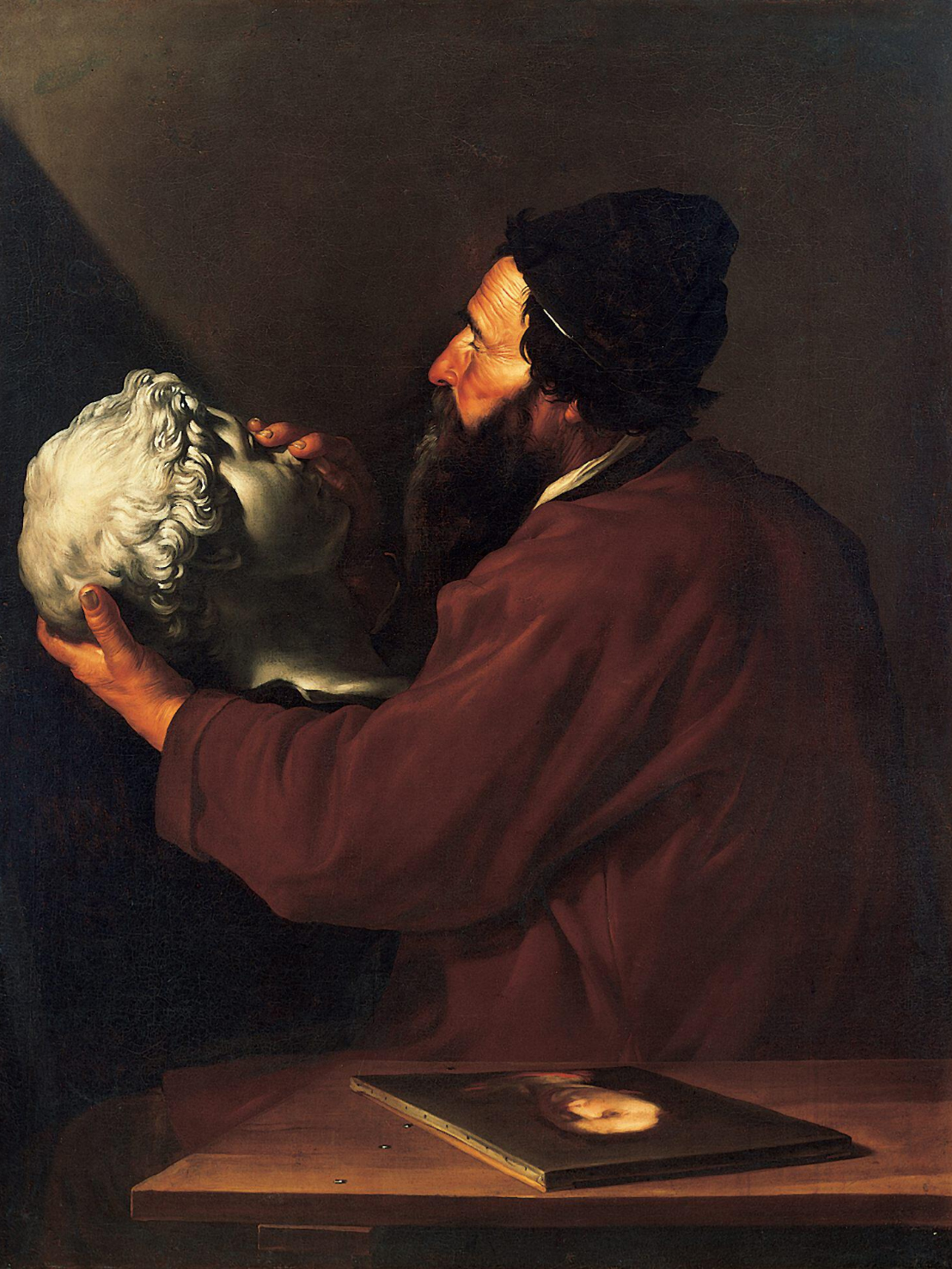
Jusepe de Ribera, The Sense of Touch, a portrait of Gonnelli, c. 1630

Gonnelli became particularly well known for his portrait busts, which were often finished with a verdigris that gave the look of antique metal. Among his commissions were busts of Ferdinando II de' Medici and Pope Urban VIII. According to Baldinucci, subjects were posed at Gonnelli’s side, and his hands would move back and forth moulding a portrait. His contemporaries had some difficulty believing he was blind: one subject, described only as ‘a cardinal’, tried to trick him by sending another man to pose in his place; on another occasion Gonnelli was made to work in a darkened room.

Because contemporary biographers were fascinated by his predicament and emphasized that to the detriment of scholarship, Gonnelli’s works can be difficult to verify. It is probable that his loss of sight restricted him to the style of della Robbia that he was taught as a young man and prevented his full artistic growth. According to Baldinucci, Gonnelli lived comfortably, and remained jolly. He married in 1640 had ten children, played guitar and sang, and engaged in various love affairs. Gonnelli died in Rome in 1656, reportedly from mushroom poisoning.

== Gallery ==
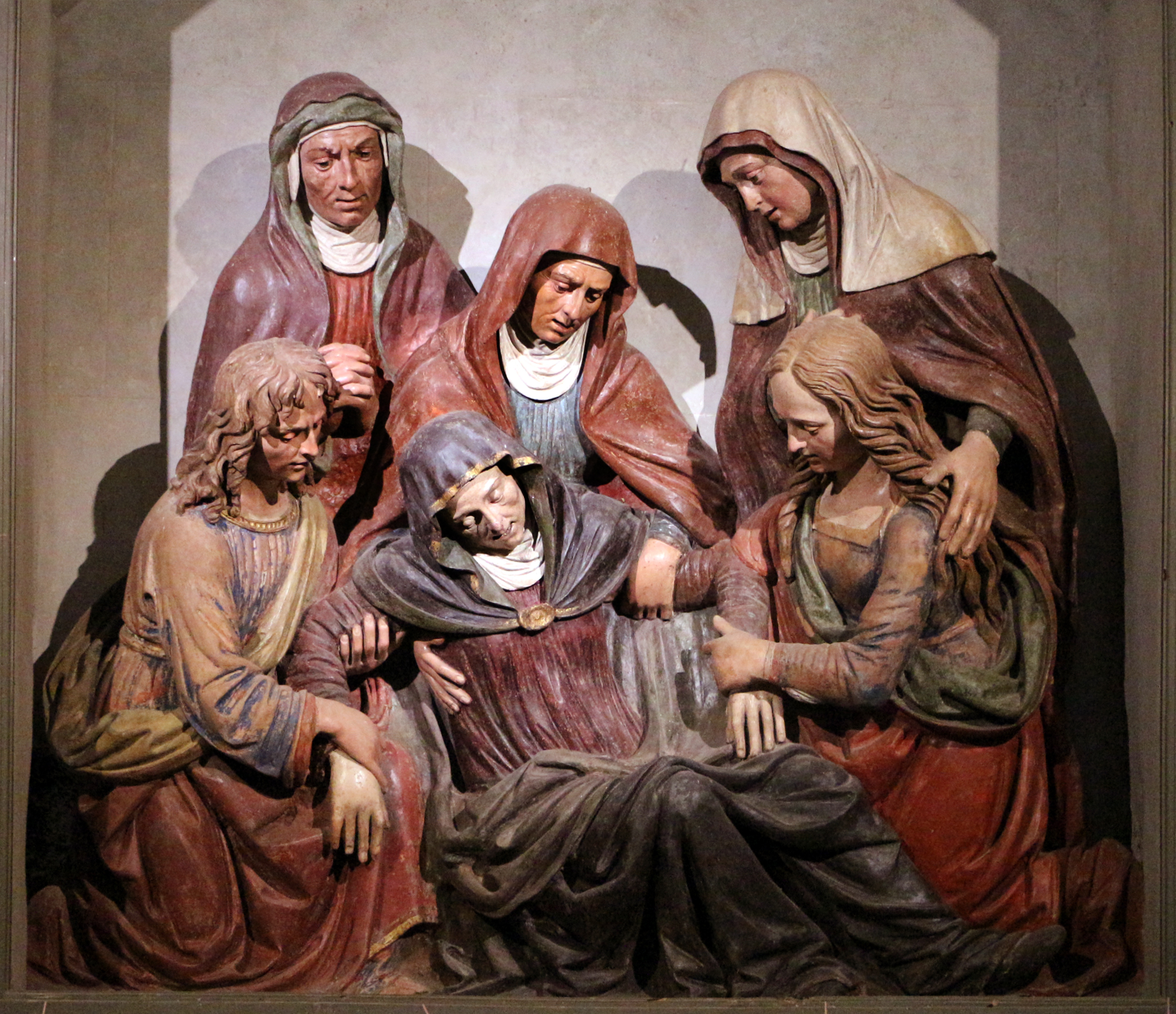
Swoon of the Virgin, San Vivaldo Monastery, Montaione

Bust of Cardinal Carlo de' Medici, Bargello, Florence

Bust of Cosimo II de' Medici, Pinacoteca e Museo Civico di Volterra

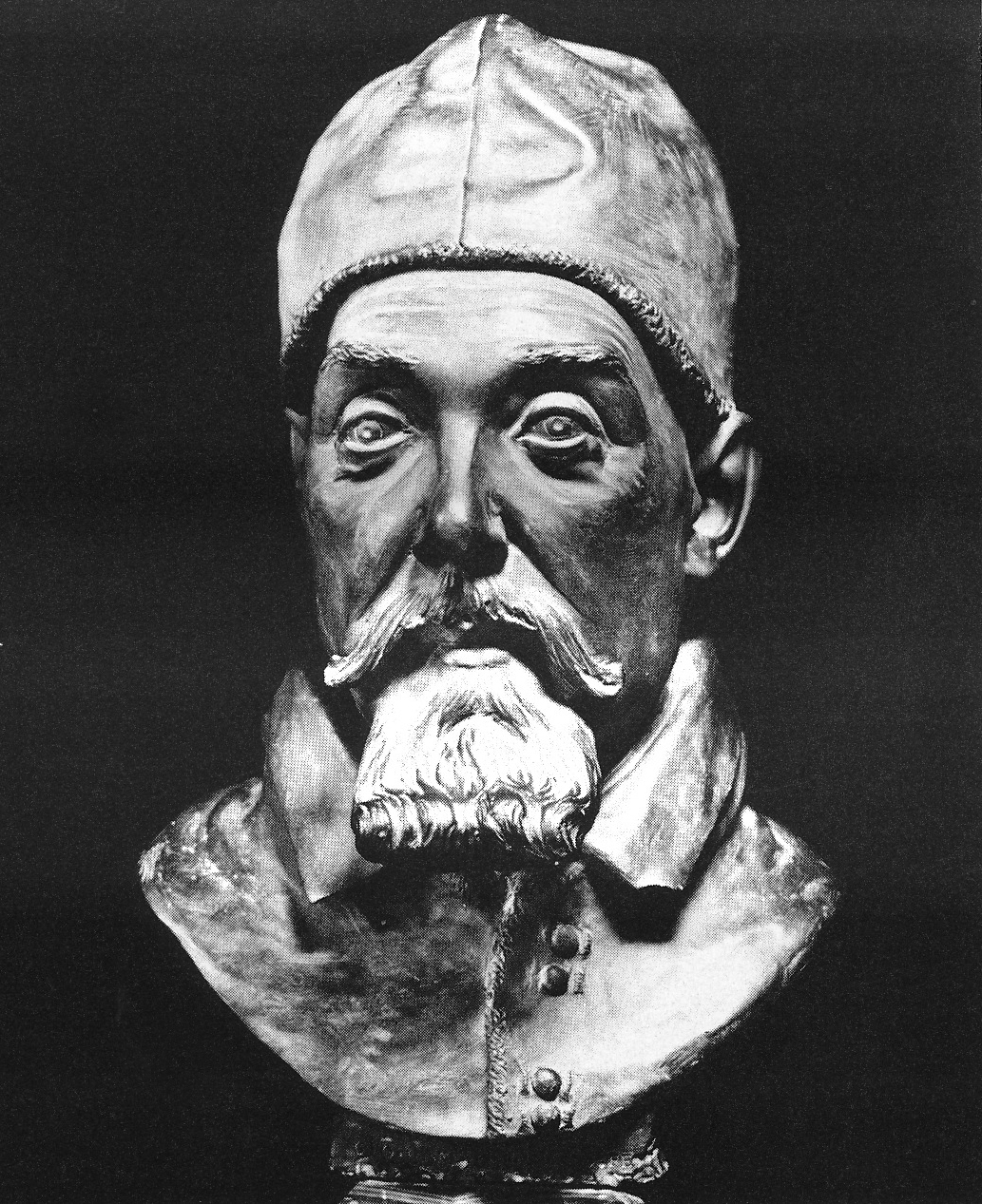
Bust of Pope Urban VIII, Palazzo Barberini, Rome

The Deposition, San Pietro a Monticelli, Florence

Bust of Canon Francesco Chiarenti, Museo del Vetro, Gambassi Terme

Bust of Man, priv. col.

Pietà, Museum of Fine Arts, Budapest

== Bibliography ==
- Baldinucci, Filippo (1974). Paola Barocchi (ed.). Notizie de' Professori del Disegno (in Italian). Vol. IV. Florence: S.P.E.S. pp. 620–629.
- Fitz Darby, Delphine (1957). "Ribera and the Blind Men". The Art Bulletin. 39 (3). The Art Bulletin, Vol. 39, No. 3: 195–217. doi:10.2307/3047713. JSTOR 3047713.
- Bellesi, Sandro (2001). "GONNELLI, Giovanni, detto il Cieco di Gambassi". Dizionario Biografico degli Italiani (in Italian). Vol. 57: Giulini–Gonzaga. Rome: Institute of the Italian Encyclopaedia. ISBN 978-88-12-00032-6.
