= Giovanni Battista Primi =

Italian painter

Giovanni Battista Primi (died 1657) was an Italian marine landscape and portrait painter. He was a pupil of Agostino Tassi and a native of Rome. He resided a long time at Genoa, where he died of plague.
