= Sigismondo Coccapani =

Italian painter

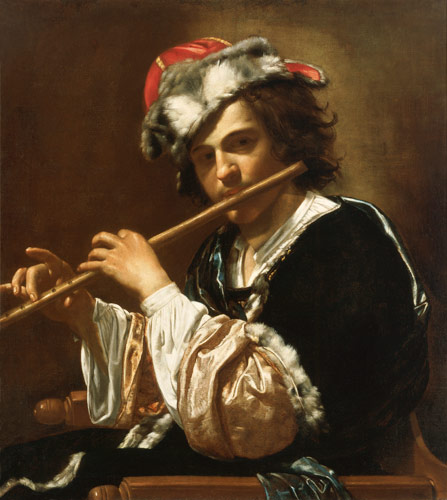
- The flutist, c. 1630-40, Uffizi, Florence
- Born: 10 August 1583; Florence, Duchy of Florence
- Died: 3 March 1643 (aged 59); Florence, Duchy of Florence
- Resting place: Santa Maria Maggiore, Florence
- Education: Cigoli
- Known for: Painting
- Movement: Baroque

Sigismondo Coccapani (10 August 1583 – 3 March 1643) was an Italian painter of the Baroque period. His drawing style was heavily indebted to that of his teacher, Cigoli, and some drawings once thought to be by Cigoli are now attributed to him.

== Life ==
Coccapani was born at Florence in 1585 to Maria Margherita Chiosi, a Florentine woman, and Regolo Coccapani, a goldsmith who worked on the Ponte Vecchio. He was the nephew of Paolo Coccapani, who served as Bishop of Reggio Emilia, from 1625 to 1650. Coccapani at first studied literature and mathematics, but abandoned them to devote himself to art. He studied architecture under Bernardo Buontalenti and painting with Cigoli in Rome. Through Cigoli, he came into contact with Galileo Galilei, a close friend of Cigoli's. Using his scientific background he showed Cigoli, who was making a record of solar activity for Galileo, how to observe and record sunspots through a method of projection. On April 7, 1609, Coccapani matriculated in the Accademia delle Arti del Disegno. Between 1610 and 1613, he assisted Cigoli on his work on the dome of the Pauline Chapel in Santa Maria Maggiore.

Coccapani returned to Florence in 1613, where he completed most of his work as an independent artist. His first known independent work is the frescoed lunette in the cloister of the Dominican convent of San Marco, Florence, depicting St. Antoninus of Florence Taking Money away from Two False Mendicants (1613). Between 1615 and 1617 he received payments for painting the fresco Michelangelo Crowned by the Arts on the ceiling of the Galleria in the Casa Buonarroti; in the same years he painted the Adoration of the Magi, initialled and dated 1617 (Signa, Santa Maria in Castello). Other initialled and dated paintings include Erminia and the Shepherds (1620; priv. col.), the Concert of Putti (1628; Florence, Uffizi) and the Virgin and Child with St. Francis (1638; Milan, priv. col.).

These works provide a firm basis for assessing Coccapani’s mature work, which, distinguished by his love of rich fabrics and dress, and his ability to portray the emotions, is still indebted to the late style of Cigoli. His lively, narrative style is typical of Florentine painting in the late 17th century. Coccapani’s last known work is the decoration of the Martelli Chapel (1642) in the church of San Gaetano, Florence. He died in Florence on 3 March 1643, aged 59, and was buried in Santa Maria Maggiore. His architectural work, mentioned by early sources, is known through a few drawings (Florence, Uffizi) and by a treatise on hydraulics (Florence, National Central Library, Galileiani MS. 108). Coccapani and his brother Giovanni made a collection of drawings by Cigoli and his circle, many of which eventually passed into the collection of the Uffizi.

== Selected Works ==
- Jael and Sisera, Musée des Beaux-Arts de Brest;
- Concert of Putti, Uffizi, Florence;
- Sleeping Girl, Museum of Fine Arts, Budapest;
- The Flutist, Uffizi, Florence;
- The Holy Family, Yekaterinburg Museum of Fine Arts;
- St. Maria Maddalena de' Pazzi, Musée des Beaux-Arts de Chambéry;
- Portrait of Ludovico Cigoli, Musée des Beaux-Arts de Chambéry;
- The Ecstasy of Saint Francis, Musée de la Chartreuse de Douai;
- Tobias Restores His Father's Sight, Museu Nacional de Belas Artes, Rio de Janeiro;
- Moses and the Daughters of Jethro, Detroit Institute of Arts;
- Ecstasis of Mary Magdalene, Palazzo Pitti, Florence.
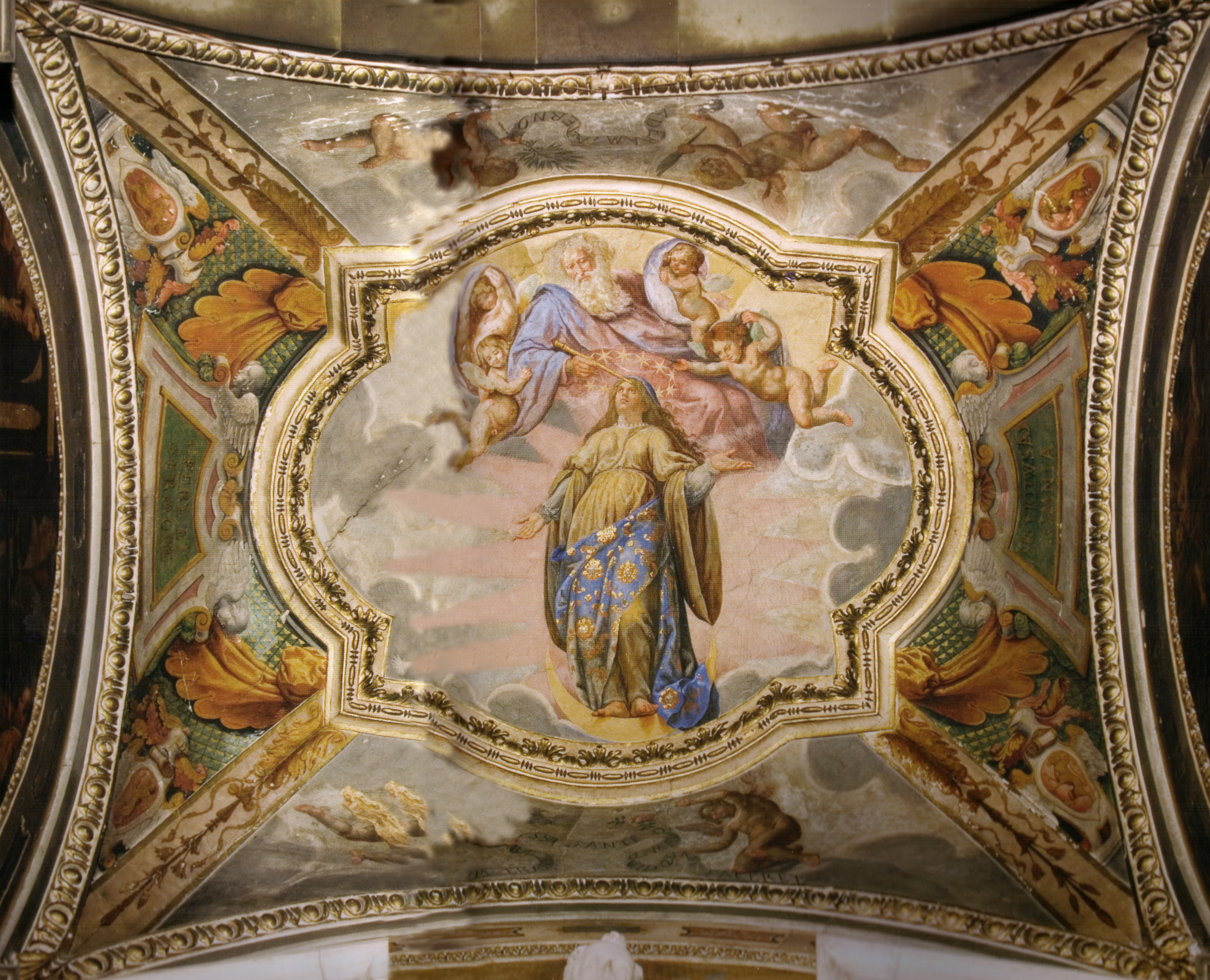
The immaculate and the eternal among the angels, fresco in San Gaetano, Florence

Jahel et Sisarah, Musée des Beaux-Arts de Brest

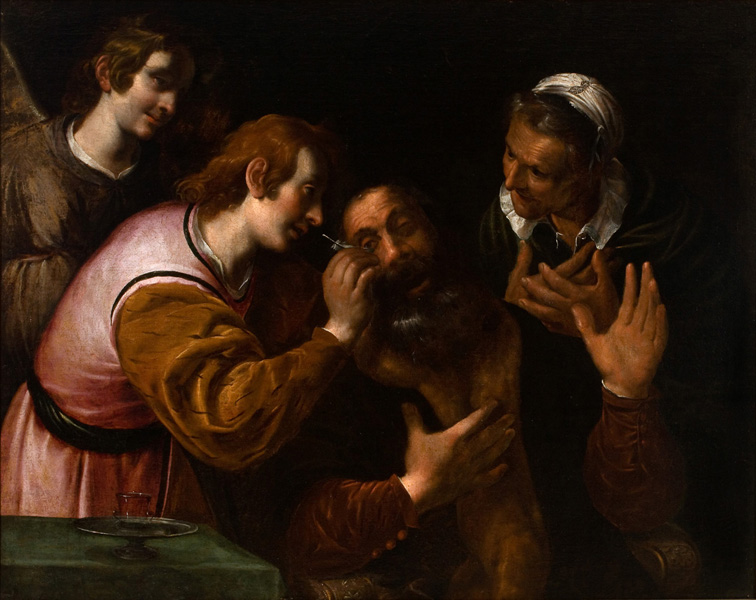
Tobias Restores His Father's Sight, Museu Nacional de Belas Artes, Rio de Janeiro

Moses and the Daughters of Jethro, Detroit Institute of Arts

Ecstasis of Mary Magdalene, Palazzo Pitti, Florence

The Alms of Saint Thomas of Villanova (Detail), Santi Jacopo e Filippo, Scarperia

== Sources ==
- Sricchia Santoro, Fiorella (1982). "COCCAPANI, Sigismondo". Dizionario Biografico degli Italiani (in Italian). Vol. 26: Cironi–Collegno. Rome: Institute of the Italian Encyclopaedia. ISBN 978-88-12-00032-6.
- Reeves, Eileen (1999). Painting the Heavens: Art and Science in the Age of Galileo. Princeton University Press. p. 252. ISBN 0691009767.

Attribution:
