= Cosimo Lotti =

Italian engineer, scenographer, and landscape designer

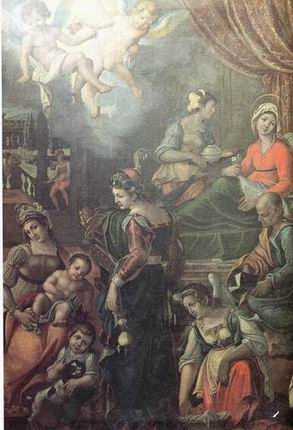
Birth of Mary in San Giorgio a Castelnuovo

Cosimo Lotti (1571–1643) was an Italian engineer, scenographer, and landscape designer. He worked around Florence until in his mid-fifties he moved to Madrid where he produced theatrical spectacles for the royal court.

Lotti was born in Florence in 1571 and first became a pupil of Bernardino Poccetti. He then worked with Bernardo Buontalenti on the lay out of the Boboli Gardens and went on to install water features in other gardens. His paintings included a Birth of Mary for the church of San Giorgio a Castelnuovo in Prato.

In 1626 he left Florence for Spain, at the request of the Count Duke of Olivares, to join the court of Philip IV as an engineer. As well as redesigning royal gardens in the Italianate style, particularly involving spectacular fountains, he impressed the King with his cleverly engineered theatrical special effects. This included an extravagant staging of a musical piece in the Italian style with poetry by Lope de Vega.

Lotti became the organiser of the theatre at the Palacio del Buen Retiro. He was recognised by being given a royal pension and remained in Madrid until his death in 1643.

== Sources ==
- Baldinucci, Filippo (1728). Notizie de' Professori del Disegno, Da Cimabue in qua, Secolo V. dal 1610. al 1670. Distinto in Decennali. Stamperia S.A.R. per li Tartini, e Franchi (Googlebooks entry). p. 306.
