= Francesco Zugni =

Italian painter (1574–1621)

Francesco Zugni (1574–1621) was an Italian painter of the late Renaissance period. He was born and active in Brescia. He was a pupil of Palma Giovane. His relationship, if any with Francesco Zugno is unclear .
