= Orazio Mochi =

Italian sculptor

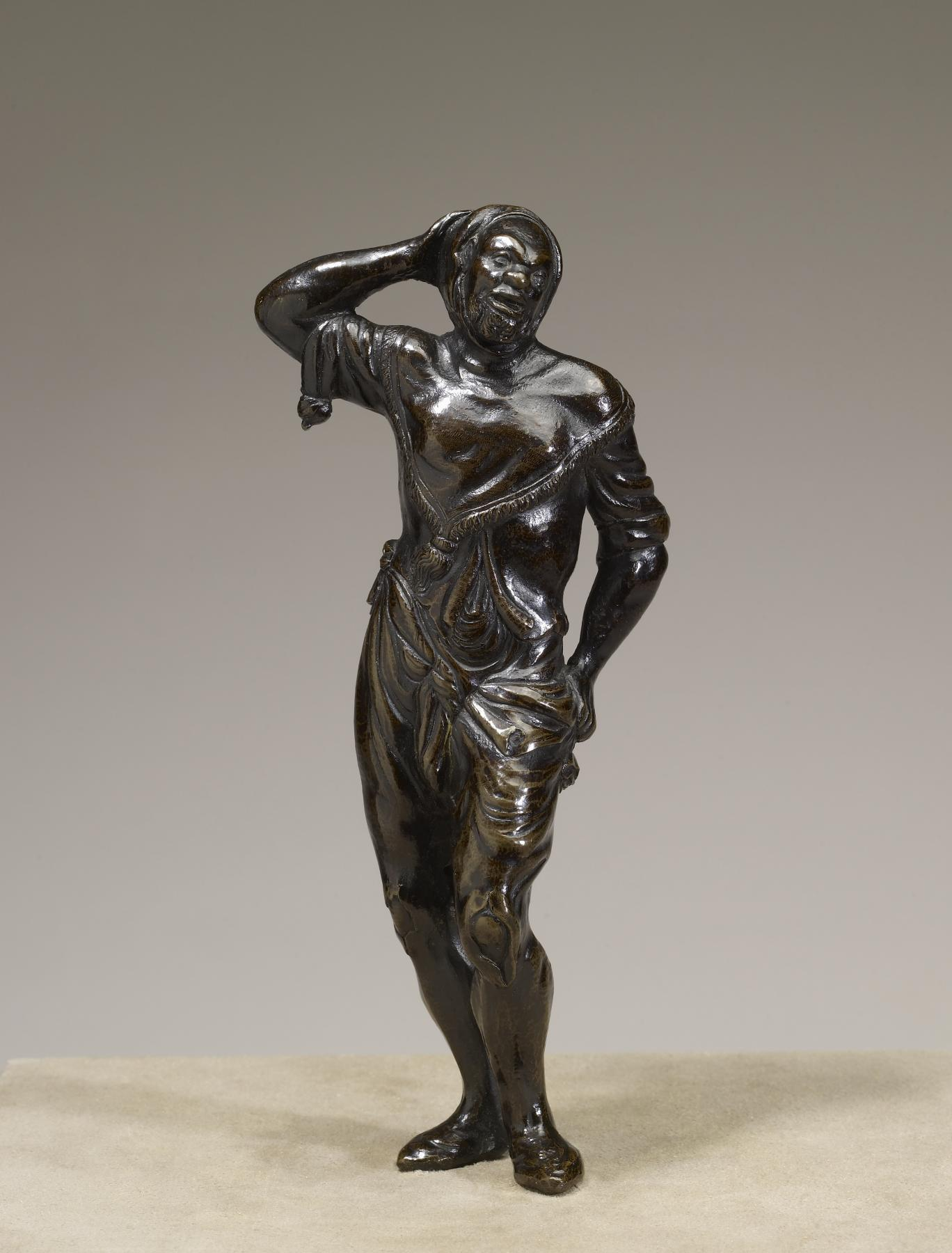
African Court Jester, Walters Art Museum, Baltimore

Orazio Mochi (1571–1625) was an Italian sculptor of the late-Mannerist period, active mainly in Florence. He was a pupil of Giovanni Caccini. The sculptor Francesco Mochi was his son.

== Sources ==
- Baldinucci, Filippo (1728). Notizie de' Professori del Disegno, Da Cimabue in qua, Secolo V. dal 1610. al 1670 [Notice of the Professors of Design, from Cimabue to now, from 1610-1670]. Florence: Stamperia S.A.R. per li Tartini, e Franchi. p. 137.
