= Luciano Borzone =

Italian painter (1590–1645)

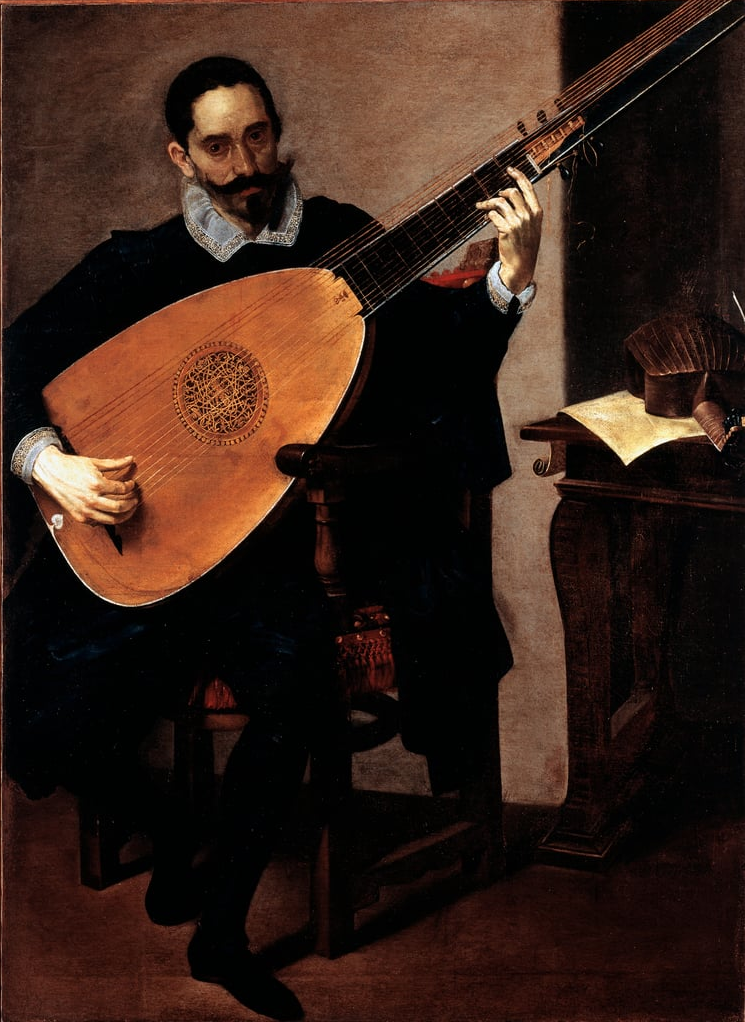
Portrait of Gerolamo Gallo by Luciano Borzone (ca. 1635–1645), Palazzo Bianco, Genoa

Luciano Borzone (1590 – 12 July 1645) was an Italian painter of a late-Mannerist and early-Baroque style active mainly in his natal city of Genoa.

== Biography ==
Luciano Borzone was born in Genoa in 1590. After an apprenticeship with Filippo Bertolotto, his uncle, the Duke Alberigo of Massa Lunigiana patronized his work as a pupil of Cesare Corte. He was a prominent portrait painter. In Genoa, he painted the Presentation in the Temple for the church of San Domenico, and the Baptism of Christ for the church of Santo Spirito. He etched some plates from his own compositions: Portrait of Giustiniani; St. Peter delivered from Prison; Prometheus devoured by the Vulture; Children playing; and a set of devout subjects.

His three sons, Giovanni Battista and Carlo (both who died of the plague in 1657), and Francesco Maria (1625–1679) were also painters. Francesco Maria, the third son, excelled in painting landscapes and sea-pieces in the style of Lorrain and Pouissin, and came to be employed at the court of Louis XIV. Additional disciples were Giovanni Battista Mainero, Giovanni Battista Monti, Gioacchino Assereto, and Silvestro Chiesa. A highly cultured man, Borzone wrote poetry in the Genoese dialect and was acquainted with important figure of his time, most notably the poet Gabriello Chiabrera and the future doge Giacomo Lomellini.

Borzone died in Genoa in 1645, supposedly from a fall from scaffolding while painting a picture of a Nativity for the ceiling of the Nunziata del Vastato.

== Bibliography ==
- Bryan, Michael (1886). Robert Edmund Graves (ed.). Dictionary of Painters and Engravers, Biographical and Critical. Vol. I: A-K. London: George Bell and Sons. p. 160.
- Soprani, Raffaello (1769). Carlo Giuseppe Ratti (ed.). Delle vite de' pittori, scultori, ed architetti genovesi; Tomo secundo scritto da Carlo Giuseppe Ratti. Genoa: Stamperia Casamara. pp. 243–254.
- Manzitti, Camillo (1969). "Riscoperta di Luciano Borzone". Commentari: rivista di critica e storia dell'arte. XX (3): 210–222.
- Manzitti, Camillo (1971). "Influenze caravaggesche a Genova e nuovi ritrovamenti su Luciano Borzone". Paragone. XXII (259): 31–42.
- Galassi, Maria Clelia (2003). "Borzone, Luciano". Grove Art Online. doi:10.1093/gao/9781884446054.article.T010230.
