= Giovanni Battista Mainero =

Italian painter (c. 1600–1657)

Giovanni Battista Mainero (c. 1600–1657) was an Italian painter of the Baroque period, active mainly in his natal city of Genoa. He was the pupil of the painter Luciano Borzone. He died during the plague of 1657.
