= Sant'Agostino, Volterra =

Roman Catholic church

Sant'Agostino
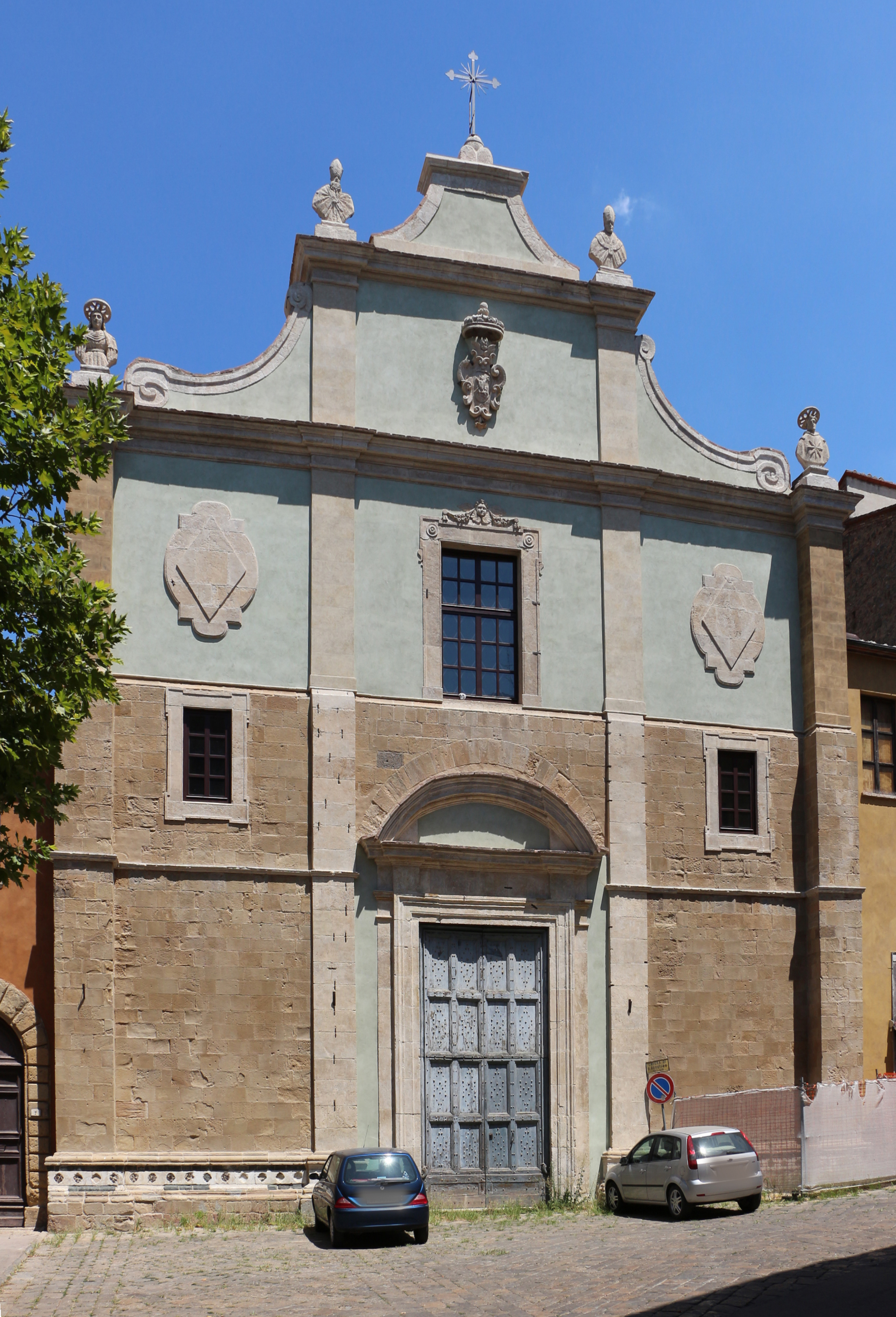

Religion
- Affiliation: Roman Catholic
- Province: Pisa

Location
- Location: Volterra, region of Tuscany, Italy
- Interactive map of Sant'Agostino

Architecture
- Type: Church
- Style: Interior refurbished in Renaissance-style

Sant'Agostino is a 13th-century, Roman Catholic church and former monastery located on Piazza XX di Settembre, in the historic center of Volterra, Italy. The church facade is just northwest of the Biblioteca Guarnacci and Museo Etrusco Guarnacci. The church since 2017 was restructured to house the Museo Diocesano di Arte Sacra (Diocesan Museum of Sacred Art) for the town of Volterra.

Construction of this church and its adjacent Augustinian monastery was prompted when the started when the order arrived with a putative relic of a spine from the crown of thorns imposed by Jesus during his passion. The Augustinians were banished in 1785 by the Grand Duke of Tuscany, Pietro Leopoldo, although the prior and a small number of monks stayed in town until 1807. The adjacent convent was supposedly built prior to 1349, along with the Santi Giacomo e Giovanni hospital, commissioned by Ottaviano Strenna and using designs by Filippo Belforti.

Initially, the church had a single nave, but by 1728 it had the additional aisles added. A further refurbishment occurred in 1885.

== Museum Collection ==
Among the items on display in the museum are:

- Bust of St Victor: reliquary donated by Pope Callixtus II in 1120 to the Bishop of Volterra
- 13th-century wooden painted crucifix
- Alabaster holy water font (1500s)
- Terracotta bust of St Linus (1521) depicts the second pope and patron saint of Volterra, made by Giovanni della Robbia
- Madonna delle Grazie (1451) by Neri di Bicci from the Church of San Giusto.
- Villamagna Altarpiece ("Virgin and Child with St John the Baptist and St Bartholomew") 1521 by Rosso Fiorentino
- St Nicola and St Peter painted by Taddeo di Bartolo
- 15th-century silver cross attributed to Antonio del Pollaiolo

== Sources ==
- Hall Information

43.40123°N 10.86351°E
