= Silvestro Chiesa =

Italian painter

Silvestro Chiesa (1623–1657) was an Italian painter of the Baroque period, active mainly in his natal city of Genoa. He was a pupil of Luciano Borzone. He died as a young man during the plague in 1657.
