= Giovanni Battista Monti =

Italian painter (died 1657)

Giovanni Battista Monti (died 1657) was an Italian painter of portraits during the Baroque period, active mainly in his natal city of Genoa. He emerged from a poor family and was apprenticed with Luciano Borzone. He died from the plague in 1657.
