= Giovanni Coccapani =

Italian painter

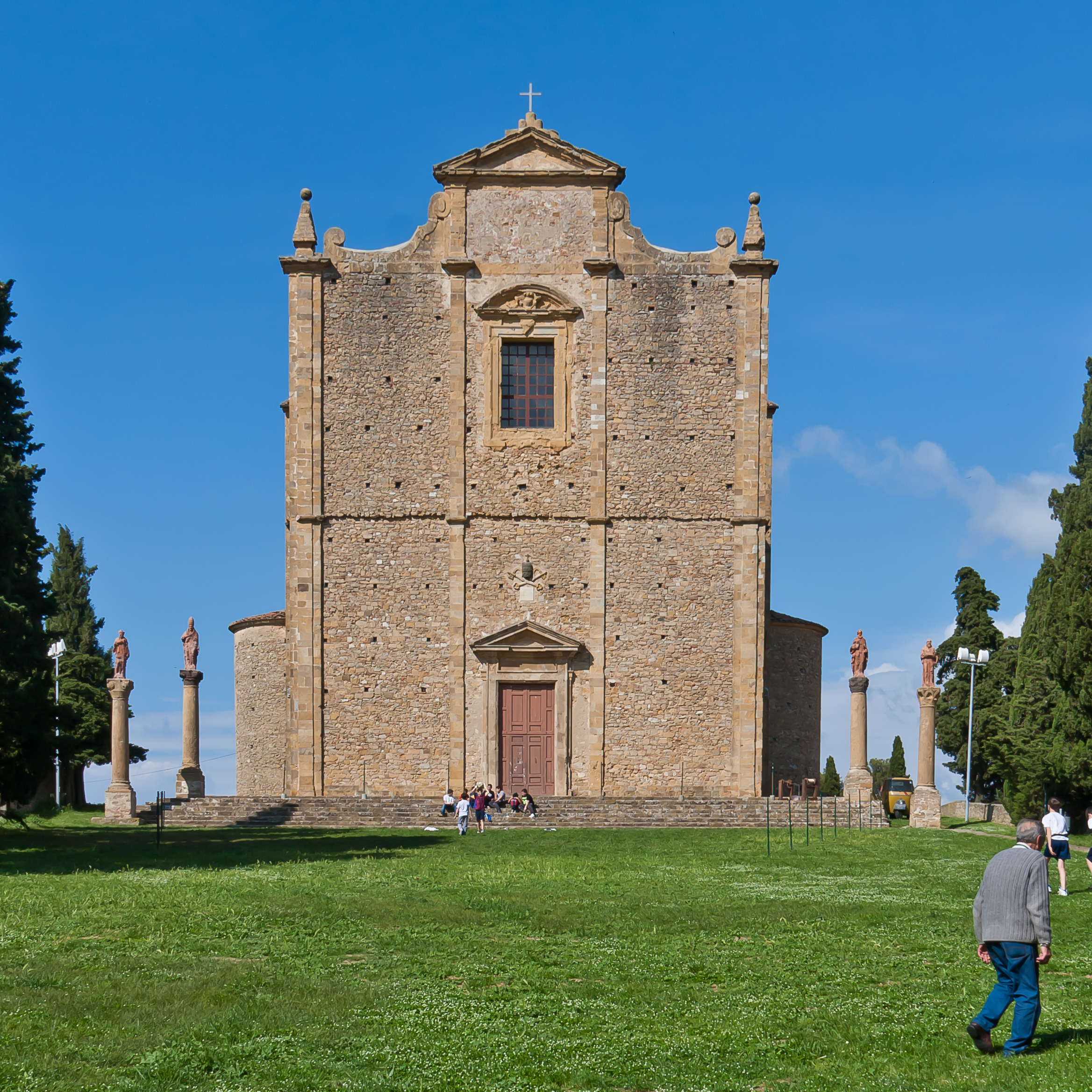
Facade of the church of saints Giusto and Clemente in Volterra.

Giovanni Coccapani (1582 – 1649) was an Italian painter and architect of the Baroque period. Born in Florence, his family was originally from Carpi. He was the brother of Sigismondo Coccapani. He travelled through Lombardy and was patronized by Duke Alfonso III in Modena. A number of architectural designs were collected by the lawyer Eustachio Cabassi of Carpi. He putatively rebuilt the San Giusto church in Volterra. Among his pupils was Ludovico Incontri.
