= Nicolaes de Helt Stockade =

Dutch Golden Age painter

Nicolaes van Helt Stockade
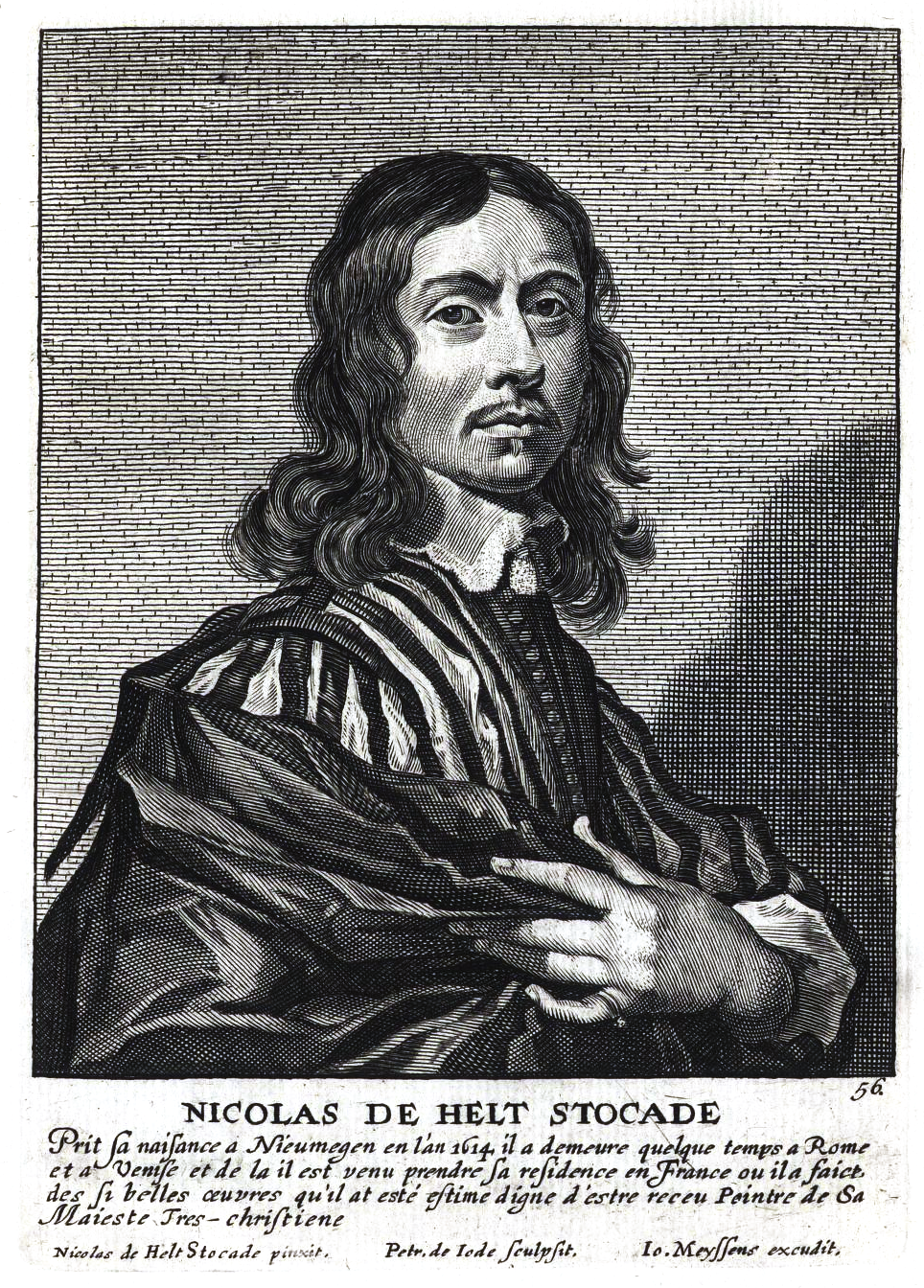
- Nicolaes de Helt Stockade in Het Gulden Cabinet.
- Born: Nicolaes de Helt Stockade; 1614; Nijmegen
- Died: 1669 (aged 54–55); Amsterdam
- Known for: Painting
- Movement: Baroque

Nicolaes van Helt Stockade (1614–1669), was a Dutch Golden Age painter.

== Biography ==
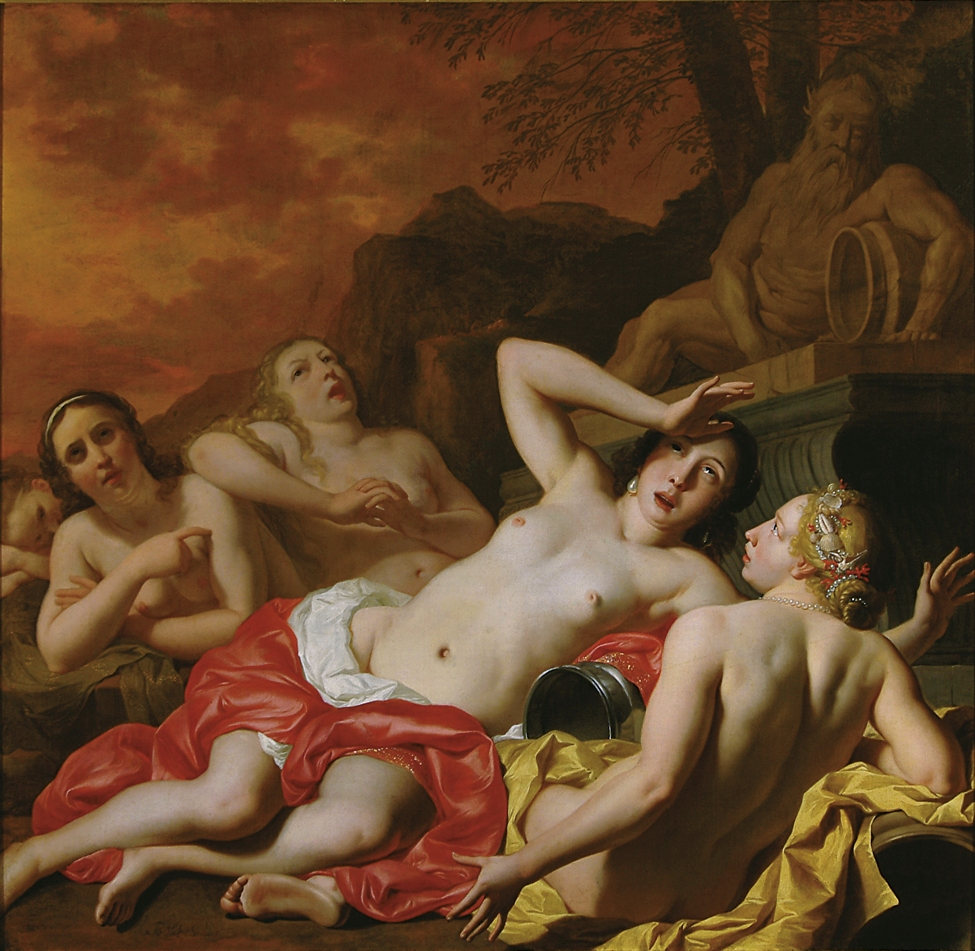
Mourning Phaëton, painted in 1650–60.

According to Houbraken, Joost van den Vondel made a poem about him.

Stockade served as a court painter to King Louis XIII between 1637 and 1645. According to the RKD he became a master in the Antwerp Guild of Saint Luke in 1646 and worked on the city hall of Nijmegen and the Amsterdam City Hall.
