= Filippo Baldinucci =

Italian art historian and biographer (1625–1696)

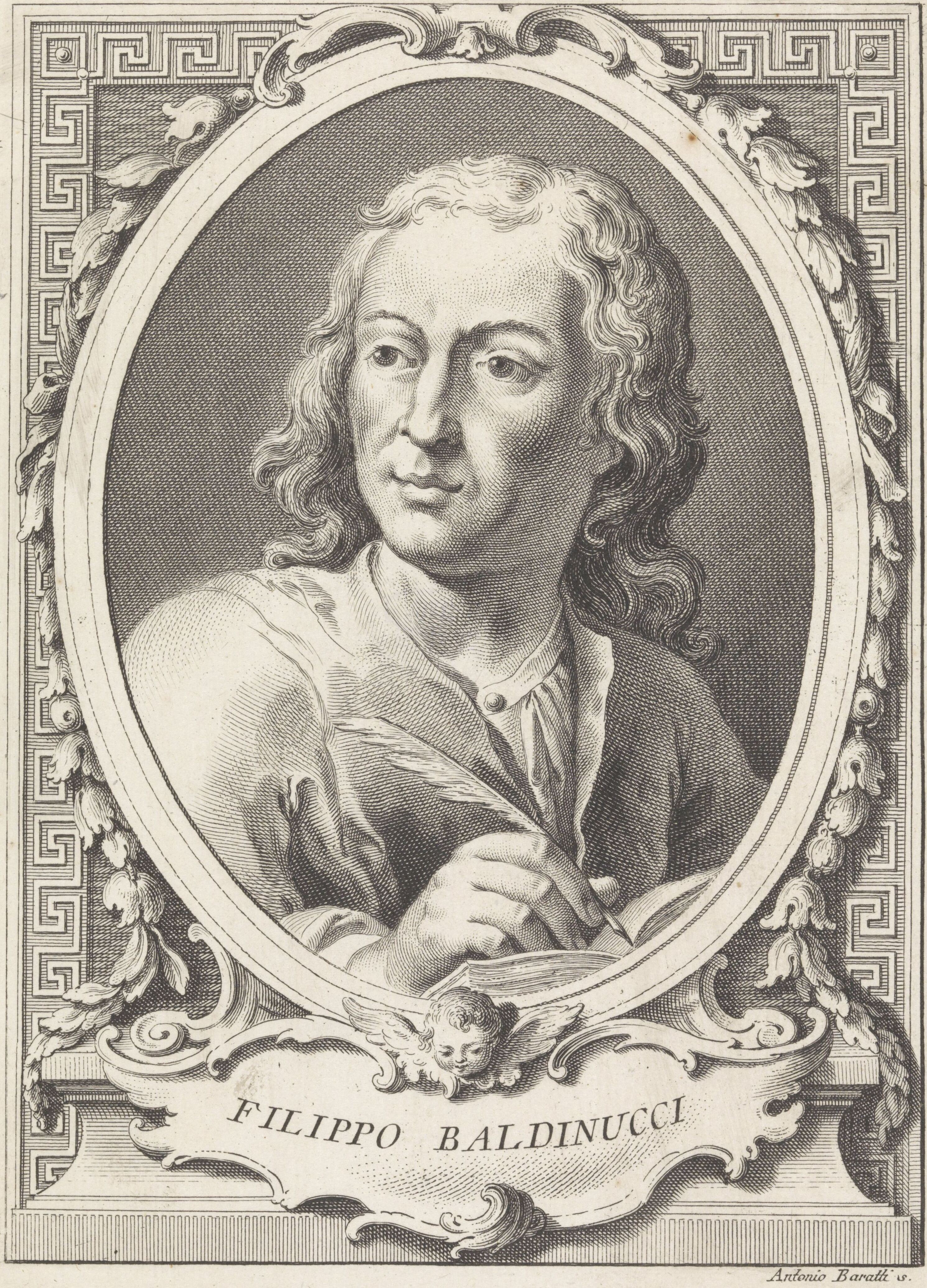
- Filippo Baldinucci. Engraving by Antonio Baratti
- Born: 3 June 1625; Florence, Grand Duchy of Tuscany
- Died: 10 January 1696 (aged 70); Florence, Grand Duchy of Tuscany
- Occupations: Art historian and biographer
- Movement: Baroque

Academic work
- Notable works: Notizie de' Professori del Disegno, Da Cimabue in qua, Secolo V. dal 1610. al 1670

Filippo Baldinucci (3 June 1625 – 10 January 1696) was an Italian art historian and biographer.

== Life ==
Baldinucci is considered among the most significant Florentine biographers/historians of the artists and the arts of the Baroque period. Patronised by the Medici, he aspired to become the new Vasari by renewing and expanding his biographies of artists, to which Baldinucci added lives of French and Flemish artists omitted by Vasari. His most important work was this biographical dictionary of artists, Artists in biographies by Filippo Baldinucci, of which the publication began in 1681 and continued after his death.

His biography of Gian Lorenzo Bernini was published in 1682.

Baldinucci came from a prominent and wealthy family of the Florentine merchant elite. As well as writing he drew portraits in chalk and modeled in clay; many of his deft and lively chalk portraits of friends are in the collection of the Uffizi. For Cardinal Leopoldo de' Medici, brother of Ferdinando II de' Medici, Grand Duke of Tuscany and a scholar and patron of the arts, he began as bookkeeper in 1664 and developed, after the Cardinal's death, into virtually the curator of the Grand Ducal collections. In this way Baldinucci made a name as one of Italy's leading connoisseurs. His work recataloguing and adding to the Medici collections, first of drawings and then of paintings, was groundbreaking, using new ideas about organisation and completeness to make these the most modern collections of the time—collections in large part the foundation of the Uffizi's art holdings.

This meticulous work was based on an ability to distinguish between the hands of different painters—an idea then new and untested, and one that opened up the field of connoisseurship that enabled the attributions of Italian drawings, which are generally unsigned. In his Vocabolario, the first dictionary of artistic terms, Baldinucci provided fourteen definitions of style using eighty different terms, and applied some of his terms to "bad" art.

From this grew his Notizie, in which he consciously intended to build upon the Vite of Giorgio Vasari; Baldinucci's was the first art history to trace the lives and work of artists not only of one region (Vasari was prejudiced towards Tuscan artists) but all Italy, and indeed beyond. He studied closely the stylistic debts of the great masters to one another, and in this, and his meticulous use of documentation and archives, he was centuries ahead in the discipline of art history.

In his Vocabolario (1681) he presented terms of art and technical terms, not only for the fine arts but for goldsmith's work, pietre dure, color pigments and tools.

In other ways Baldinucci was very much a man of his time, of the Counter-Reformation and of the Baroque. Educated at a Jesuit school, he was intensely pious—before marrying, he completed the whole of Ignatius of Loyola's Spiritual Exercises to discover whether he should in fact devote himself to a single life. Three of his sons went into the church, and one, Antonio, was a Jesuit missionary later beatified.

He had great appreciation of the Baroque, and wrote in a periodic style which reflected it, each phrase opening from the preceding, full of periphrasis and other flourishes of rhetoric, though flowing. His understanding of art stemmed largely from his religion, for he believed that it came as divine inspiration into special lives, the lives of the artists he so painstakingly recorded.

Baldinucci's son wrote the first biography of his father; Baldinucci's notes are conserved in the Biblioteca Nazionale Centrale, Florence (MSS Fondo Nazionale II.II.110)

== Works ==
- Comminciamento e progresso dell'arte dell'intagliare in rame colle vite di molti de' più eccellenti maestri della stessa professione... Florence 1667 and further editions. Baldinucci's engraving forms the frontispiece. This contains the first mention in Italy of Rembrandt's prints.
- Vocabolario toscano dell'arte del disegno Florence 1681. Reprinted 1976.
- Artists in biographies by Filippo Baldinucci 6 vols, Florence 1681–1728, published in part posthumously. A second edition in six volumes with additional materials was edited by A. Matteoli (1725–30) and was reprinted in Rome, 1975.
- Vita del cav. Gio. Lorenzo Bernino, Lettera a Vinc. Capponi, Veglia sulle Belle Arti, Lezione accademica were collected and appended to the second volume of his Notizie, 1682.

== 'Filippo Baldinucci on the Privilege of Burial' ==
Filippo Baldinucci on the Privilege of Burial is the title of a poem by Robert Browning from his 1876 collection, Pacchiarotto, and How He Worked in Distemper. It is based on an anecdote contained in Baldinucci's life of the artist Lodovico Buti.
