= Genoese Baroque and Rococo artists =

Group of Italian Baroque painters

Artists from Genoa were influential during the 17th century. Many painters emigrated to either Venice, Florence, or Rome. Prominent stimuli to the local artists were prolonged visits to the town of artists from Spain and countries north of Italy, including Velázquez, Van Dyck, and Pierre Puget.

== 17th century ==
- Bernardo Strozzi (1581–1644)
- Giovanni Benedetto Castiglione (1609–1664)
- Giovanni Battista Monti (1657)
- Giovanni Battista Gaulli (1639–1709)
- Giovanni Battista Carlone (1653–1655)
- Alessandro Magnasco (1667–1749)
- Domenico Fiasella (1589–1669)
- Luca Cambiaso (1527–1585)
- Pierre Puget (1622–1694)
- Valerio Castello (1624–1659)
- Giovanni Andrea De Ferrari (1598–1669)
- Orazio De Ferrari (1606–1657)
- Gregorio De Ferrari (c. 1647–1726)
- Lorenzo De Ferrari (1680–1744)
- Valerio Castello (1625–1659)
- Bartolomeo Biscaino (1632–1657)
- Giulio Benso (1592–1668)
- Domenico Piola (1627–1703)
- Giovanni Andrea Ansaldo (1584–1638)
- Gioacchino Assereto (1600–1649)
- Francesco Maria Schiaffino
- Filippo Parodi
- Giuseppe Badaracco (1588–1657)
- Giovanni Raffaello Badaracco (1648–1726)
- Giovanni Stefano Verdura
- Carlo Antonio Tavella (1668–1738)
- Giuseppe Palmieri (1674–1740)

== See also ==
- Genoese School
