= Elvira =

Female given name

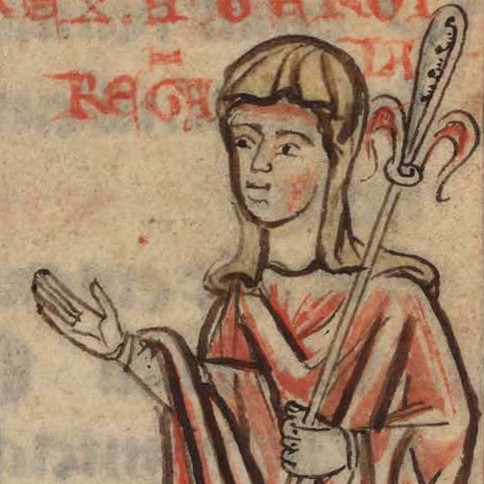
- Elvira Menéndez, wife of Alfonso V
- Gender: Female

Other gender
- Masculine: Elvir

Origin
- Meaning: Happy, spear, truth
- Region of origin: Europe

Other names
- Variant form: Alvira

Elvira is a female given name. It is believed to have first been recorded in medieval Spain; some sources state that it is likely of Germanic (Gothic) origin.

In the Balkans, Elvira is popular among Bosniaks, Croats, and Slovenes in the former Yugoslav nations. It is also popular among Albanians. The name is also written as Alvira in the region. The region also has a male equivalent to the name: Elvir.

== People ==
=== Nobility ===
- Elvira Menéndez (died 921), daughter of Hermenegildo Gutiérrez and wife of Ordoño II of León
- Elvira of Castile, Queen of León (965–1017)
- Elvira of Castile, Queen of Sicily (c. 1100–1135), wife of Roger II, King of Sicily
- Elvira of Castile, Countess of Toulouse (before 1082?–1151)
- Elvira of Toro (1038/9–1101), daughter of King Ferdinand I of León
- Elvira Menéndez (died 1022), Queen of León (1008–1022), wife of Alfonso V of León
- Elvira Ramírez (c. 935–after 986), princess and regent of León

=== Arts and entertainment ===
- Elvira Amazar (1890s–1971), Serbian-born Russian-American soprano singer and actress
- Elvira Anderfjärd (born 1999), Swedish music producer
- Elvira Barney (1904–1936), English actress and socialite
- Elvira Betrone (1881–1961), Italian actress
- Elvira Casazza (1887–1965), Italian mezzo-soprano
- Elvira Cristi (born 1976), Chilean actress and model
- Elvira Dones (born 1960), Albanian novelist, screenwriter, and documentary film producer
- Elvira Gascón (1911–2000), Spanish painter and engraver
- Elvira Godeanu (1904–1991), Romanian stage actress
- Elvira de Hidalgo (1891–1980), Spanish coloratura soprano and teacher of Maria Callas
- Elvira Kralj (1900–1978), Slovenian actress
- Elvira Kurt (born 1961), Canadian comedian
- Elvira Madigan (1867–1889), Danish tightrope walker and trick rider
- Elvira Natali (born 1996), Indonesian actress and author
- Elvira Navarro (born 1978), Spanish writer
- Elvira Nikolaisen (born 1980), Norwegian singer-songwriter
- Elvira Notari (1875–1946), Italian filmmaker
- Elvira Pagã (1920–2003), Brazilian actress and singer
- Elvira Popescu (1894–1993), Romanian-born French actress and director
- Elvira Quintana (1935–1968), Spanish-born Mexican actress and singer
- Elvira Rahić (born 1973), Bosnian pop-folk singer
- Elvira Ríos (1913–1987), Mexican actress and singer
- Elvira T (born 1994), Russian pop singer
- Elvira Travesí (1919–2009) was a Peruvian-born Argentinean actress
- Elvira, Mistress of the Dark, stage name of Cassandra Peterson (born 1951)
- Elvire de Brissac (born 1939), French novelist and biographer
- Elvire Murail (born 1958), French author and screenwriter

=== Politicians ===
- Elvira Abdić-Jelenović (born 1967), Bosnian politician
- Elvira Aitkulova (born 1973), Russian politician
- Elvira Badaracco (1911–1994), Italian politician
- Elvira Drobinski-Weiß (born 1951), German politician
- Elvira Pola Figueroa (born 1957), Mexican politician
- Elvira Kovács (born 1982), Serbian politician
- Elvira Olivas (born 1935), Mexican politician
- Elvira "Pixie" Palladino (1932–2006), American politician
- Elvira Rodríguez (born 1949), Spanish politician and economist
- Elvira Rodríguez Leonardi, Argentine politician
- Maria Elvira Salazar (born 1961), American journalist and broadcast television anchor, U.S. Representative from Florida.

=== Sports ===
- Elvira Espinosa (born 2009), Ecuadorian swimmer
- Elvira Guerra (1855–1937), Italian equestrienne
- Elvira Herman (born 1997), Belarusian sprinter
- Elvira Holzknecht (born 1973), Austrian retired luger
- Elvira Khasyanova (born 1981), Russian synchronized swimmer
- Elvira Öberg (born 1999), Swedish biathlete
- Elvīra Ozoliņa (born 1939), Latvian and former Soviet javelin thrower
- Elvira Pančić (born 1980), Serbian sprinter
- Elvira Possekel (born 1953), German athlete
- Elvira Saadi (born 1952), retired artistic gymnast from the former Soviet Union
- Elvira Shatayeva, Russian professional mountain climber
- Elvira Stinissen (born 1979), Dutch Paralympic sitting volleyball player
- Elvira Todua (born 1986), Abkhazian Russian football goalkeeper
- Elvira Urusova (born 1968), Georgian athlete
- Elvira Vasilkova (born 1962), Belarusian former swimmer
- Elvira Ziyastinova (born 1991), Russian footballer
- Elvire Gertosio (born 1948), French gymnast
- Elvire Teza (born 1981), French gymnast

=== Other ===
- Elvira Arellano (born 1975), Mexican international activist, undocumented immigrant to the US and cause célèbre
- Elvira Chaudoir, Peruvian socialite and a double-agent during the Second World War
- Elvira Cuevas, Puerto Rican ecologist
- Elvira Devinamira, Indonesian beauty pageant titleholder
- Elvira Dolinar (1870–1961), Slovenian writer, feminist and teacher
- Elvira Fölzer (1868–after 1928), German archaeologist
- Elvira Lindo (born 1962), Spanish journalist and writer
- Elvira Lobato, Brazilian journalist
- Elvira Tânia Lopes Martins (1957–2021), Brazilian poet
- Elvira Nabiullina (born 1963), head of the Central Bank of Russia
- Elvira Nosari, Mexican educator, writer, playwright, and promoter of the education of women
- Elvira Notari (1875–1946), Italian filmmaker
- Elvira Petrozzi (1937–2023), Italian Roman Catholic nun
- Elvira Willman (1875–1925), Finnish playwright, journalist and revolutionary socialist
- Elvira Wood (1865–1928), American paleontologist who specialized in vertebrate paleontology

== Fictional characters ==
- Elvira, Mistress of the Dark, portrayed by Cassandra Peterson in television and film
- Elvira Coot (Grandma Duck), grandmother of Donald Duck
- Elvira, the title character of Noël Coward's Blithe Spirit
- Elvira, heroine of the opera I puritani
- Elvira, heroine of the opera Ernani
- Elvira, in the opera L'italiana in Algeri
- Donna Elvira, in the opera Don Giovanni
- Elvira, in the 1667 play Elvira by George Digby, 2nd Earl of Bristol
- Elvira, title character in the 1763 play Elvira by David Mallet
- Elvira Almiraghi, portrayed by Franca Valeri in the 1959 film Il vedovo
- Elvira Dutton, in Margaret Walker's book on slavery, Jubilee
- Elvira Hancock, Tony Montana's love interest, portrayed by Michelle Pfeiffer in the 1983 film Scarface
- Elvira Stitt, in the novel Whatever Happened to Baby Jane? and the 1963 film adaptation
- Elvira, in the 2005 novel Ingo by Helen Dunmore
- Elvira "Viri" Gómez García, Vilde's adaptation in Skam España
