= Genoese School (painting) =

Italian art movement

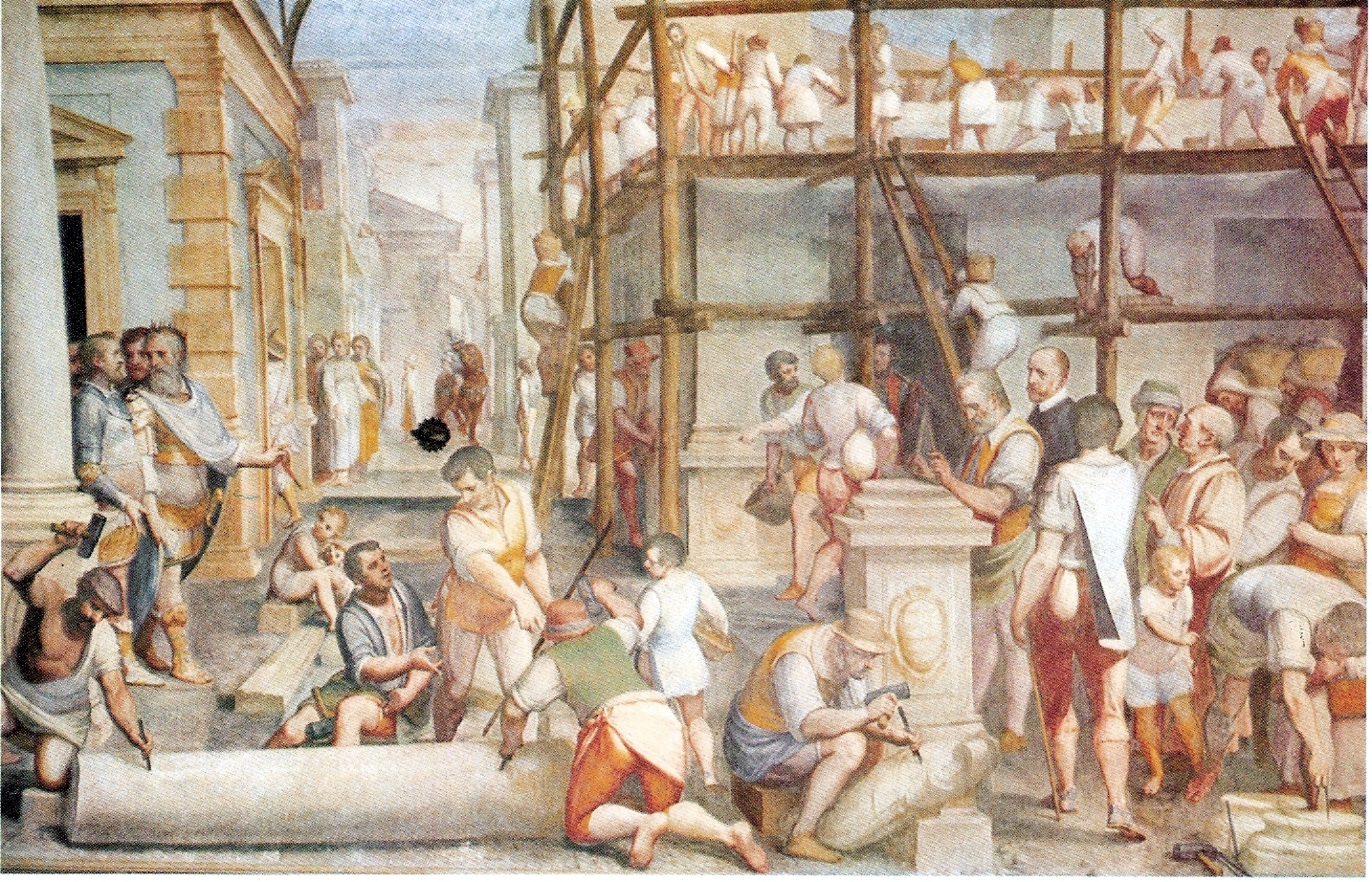
La costruzione di Strada Nuova, fresco by Luca Cambiaso in Palazzo Lercari-Parodi

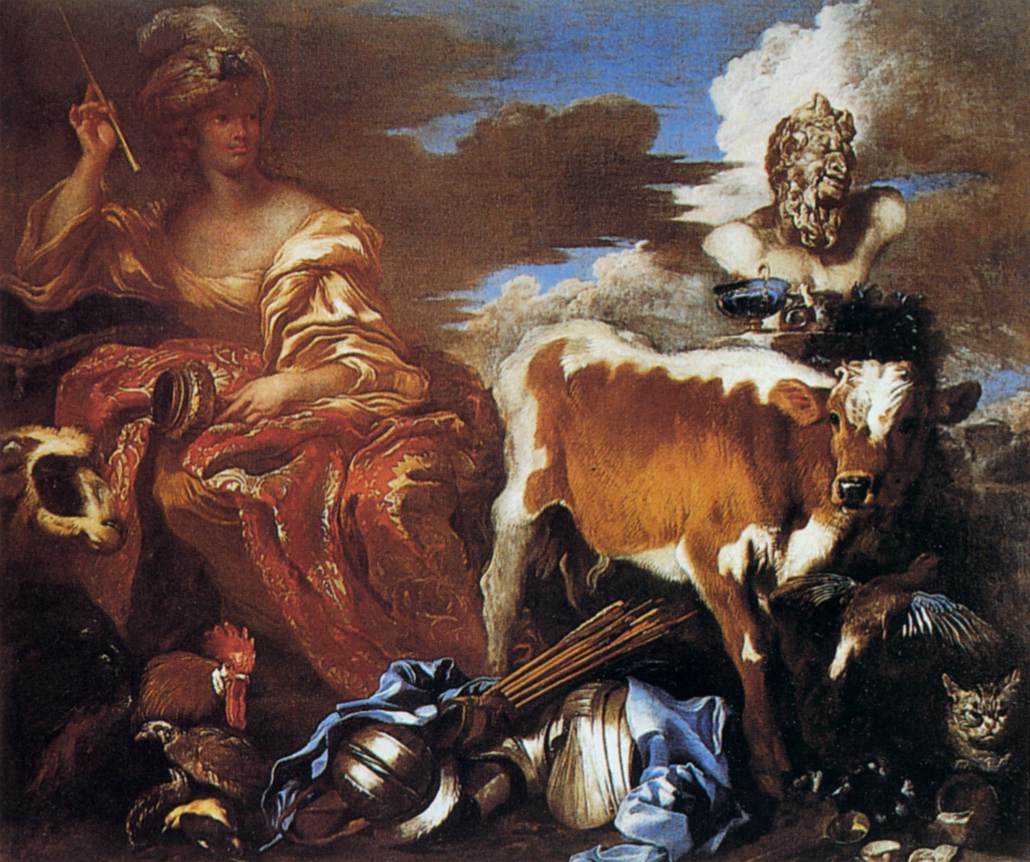
Circe, by Giovanni Benedetto Castiglione. Galleria degli Uffizi.

The Genoese School was a regional movement in Italian painting, initiated in the 17th century. The Republic of Genoa was a rich oligarchic republic, where the authorities were powerful bankers. Unlike Florence, Ferrara, Rome, Rimini, and Venice, Genoa was not developed into a significant arts center during the Renaissance. An original school of painting arose in the 1600s, developing Flemish contacts after visits by Rubens and van Dyck. The best painter was Bernardo Strozzi, called il Cappuccino or il Prete Genovese, of great importance also for Venice. Giovanni Benedetto Castiglione, called il Grechetto, took up a genre already made famous by Sinibaldo Scorza with paintings of animals and still lifes under Flemish and Venetian influence. Domenico Fiasella and Gioacchino Assereto employed a Caravaggesque style, while Valerio Castello was more eclectic. The decorators Domenico Piola and Gregorio de Ferrari worked in the churches and palaces of Genoa.

In the first half of the 18th century Alessandro Magnasco dominated painting with his strange personality, his nervous technique and his exaggerated chiaroscuro; his expressionistic distortions created a fantastic world reminiscent of Salvator Rosa, Marco Ricci, and Francesco Guardi.

== List of artists ==
=== 16th century ===
- Giovanni Battista Castello (1500/9-1569/79)
- Luca Cambiaso (1527–1585)

=== 17th century ===
- Bernardo Strozzi (1581–1644)
- Giovanni Benedetto Castiglione (1609–1664)
- Giovanni Battista Gaulli (1639–1709)
- Giovanni Battista Carlone (1603–1684)
- Alessandro Magnasco (1667–1749)
- Domenico Fiasella (1589–1669)
- Pierre Puget (1622–1694)
- Valerio Castello (1624–1659)
- Giovanni Andrea De Ferrari (1598–1669)
- Orazio De Ferrari (1606–1657)
- Gregorio De Ferrari (c.1647–1726)
- Lorenzo De Ferrari (1680–1744)
- Valerio Castello (1625–1659)
- Bartolomeo Biscaino (1632–1657)
- Giulio Benso (1592–1668)
- Domenico Piola (1627–1703)
- Giovanni Andrea Ansaldo (1584–1638)
- Gioacchino Assereto (1600–1649)
- Francesco Maria Schiaffino (1688–1763)
- Giuseppe Badaracco (1588–1657)
- Giovanni Raffaello Badaracco (1648–1726)
- Giovanni Stefano Verdura (died 1657)
- Carlo Antonio Tavella (1668–1738)
- Giuseppe Palmieri (1674–1740)

== Bibliography ==
- Гос. Эрмитаж. Каталог 1, «Западноевроейская живопись», Ленинград, «Аврора», 1976 (in Russian)
- Freedberg, Sydney J. (1993). Pelican History of Art (ed.). Painting in Italy, 1500–1600. Penguin Books Ltd.
