= Anna Franchi =

Italian novelist, translator, playwright and journalist

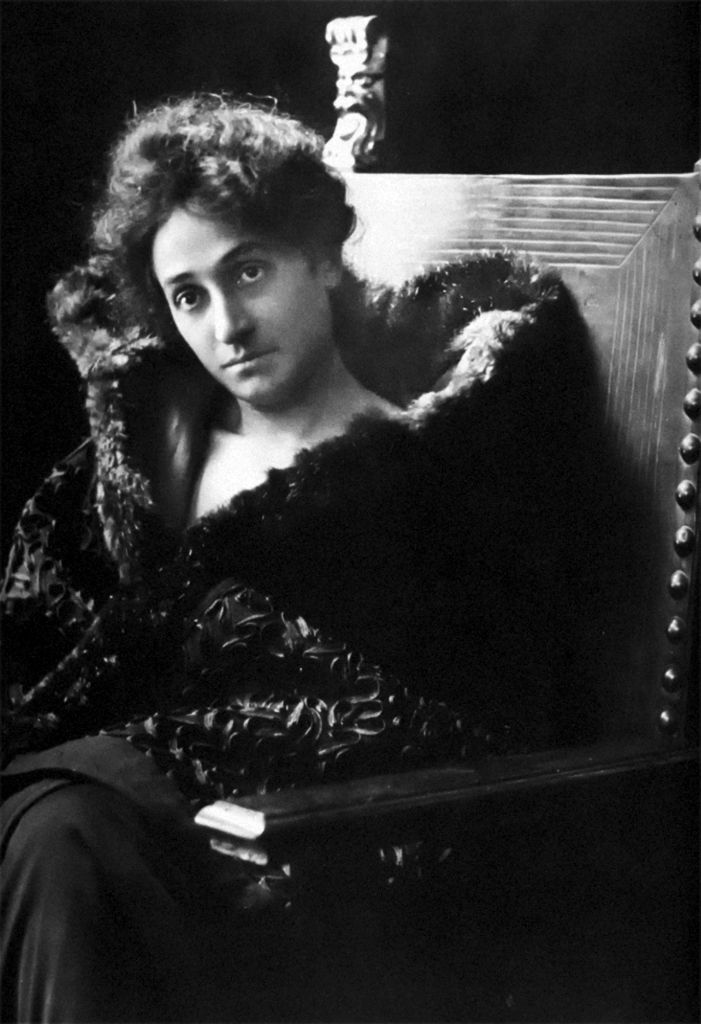
- Born: 15 January 1867; Livorno, Italy
- Died: 4 December 1954 (aged 87); Milan, Italy
- Occupations: Writer, translator, playwright, journalist
- Spouse: Ettore Martini (m. 1883)
- Children: Cesare, Gino, Folco, Ivo
- Parents: Cesare Franchi (father); Iginia Rugani (mother)

Anna Franchi (15 January 1867 – 4 December 1954) was an Italian novelist, translator, playwright and journalist.

== Biography ==
=== Early life ===
Franchi was born into the well-to-do Livorno family of Cesare Franchi, a merchant, and his wife Iginia Rugani.

Franchi learned from her father, a follower of Giuseppe Mazzini, to love the Risorgimento heroes, those who were part of the popular movement to consolidate the independent states on the Italian Peninsula into a single entity to form a new Kingdom of Italy. Her education included the study of the classics and music. A passionate pianist, she began taking lessons from a young and established composer from her hometown, violist Ettore Martini, starting in 1881.

Anna married Martini on 3 February 1883 when she was only about 16 years old. Eventually, the pair performed concerts together in Arezzo, Italy and then in Florence. Much later, Franchi wrote in her book, My Life, about the feeling of accompanying Martini on the piano, saying that it was the illusion of "Two personalities, two intellects that merged into one expression." The couple had four children: Cesare, Gino, Folco (who lived only a year) and Ivo, born in 1889.

When the marriage failed, Franchi filed for a separation and divorce. Soon, Martini moved to Philadelphia, taking with him his two oldest sons, Cesare and Gino, leaving Franchi in Italy with the youngest boy and in debt; the family's fortunes had collapsed with the death of her father. According to the law of that time, she was unable to sell her goods without her husband's authorization, so she became a writer to improve her fortunes and properly support her mother and child. As Franchi wrote in My Life, "Finding work was not an easy thing, and the need urgent […] And yet it was necessary, and yet I wanted with my hands, with my will, with the money earned by me, to make my family live."

By 1895, her first comedy for the theatre, "For Love," had been staged in Livorno.

=== Writings ===
In 1900, she earned credentials from the Lombard Association of Journalists, only the second woman to do so after Anna Kuliscioff. As a journalist, Franchi wrote for newspapers and magazines in the major cities in Italy, espousing the political, social and cultural life, especially with regard to politics, art and women's issues.

She wrote many short stories and novels for children, including the work that is considered her best, The Journey of a Lead Soldier, published by Salani in 1901 with illustrations by Carlo Chiostri, which met with considerable success.

In 1902, she published a series of works that pertained to divorce and the difficulties that women face, a subject she knew from personal experience. The novel Avanti il divorzio (The Divorce Goes On) was met with both great success and scandal. She followed that with an essay on the same subject later that year, Il Divorce e la Donna (The Divorce and the Woman). In 1903 she penned the text of a conference titled Divorce, which was held at the Popular University of Parma.

In a parallel effort to make money, Franchi began working as a French translator with challenging texts, including: The Diary of a Chambermaid by Octave Mirbeau, A Life by Guy de Maupassant, and The Prejudice of Isabella by M. Maryan. From Latin, she translated the Fables of Phaedrus.

In those same years she wrote monographs of artists and art critics such as Tuscan art and artists from 1850 to Today (1902), and the Tuscan Macchiaioli by Giovanni Fattori (1910), as well as others significant in the Macchiaioli art movement including Silvestro Lega and Telemaco Signorini. She also penned plays (in addition to For Love). Alba italiana and Burchiello, both from 1911, were performed in Milan.

In 1909, Franchi's son Gino Martini returned from the U.S. to live with her in Milan, where she had moved permanently in 1906, and together they became passionate followers of Filippo Corridoni's irredentist ideas to reclaim lost Italian territories from the Austrians.

=== World War I years ===
In 1916, Franchi's book Città Sorelle was published, supporting Corridoni's ideas. In that same year, both Gino and Ivo Martini volunteered to support the military efforts in Italy during World War I, but in 1917, she received news that her son, Gino Martini, a lieutenant of the machine-gunners, on Monte San Gabriele, had been killed while fighting there. For his sacrifice, he was posthumously awarded a silver medal.

In response to the loss of her son, she founded the League of Assistance among the Mothers of the Fallen to collectively petition the government for an annuity for mothers of a married soldier who did not enjoy the right to claim a pension. She also published Il Figlio alla Guerra, a collection of conferences held at the Royal Academy of Milan. With the advent of fascism, she devoted herself only to literature, interrupting all social and political activity.

In the 1920s, Franchi published the novels Alla Catena (1922) and La Torta di Mele (1927), the historical essay Caterina de 'Medici (1932), as well as theatrical texts and stories for children.

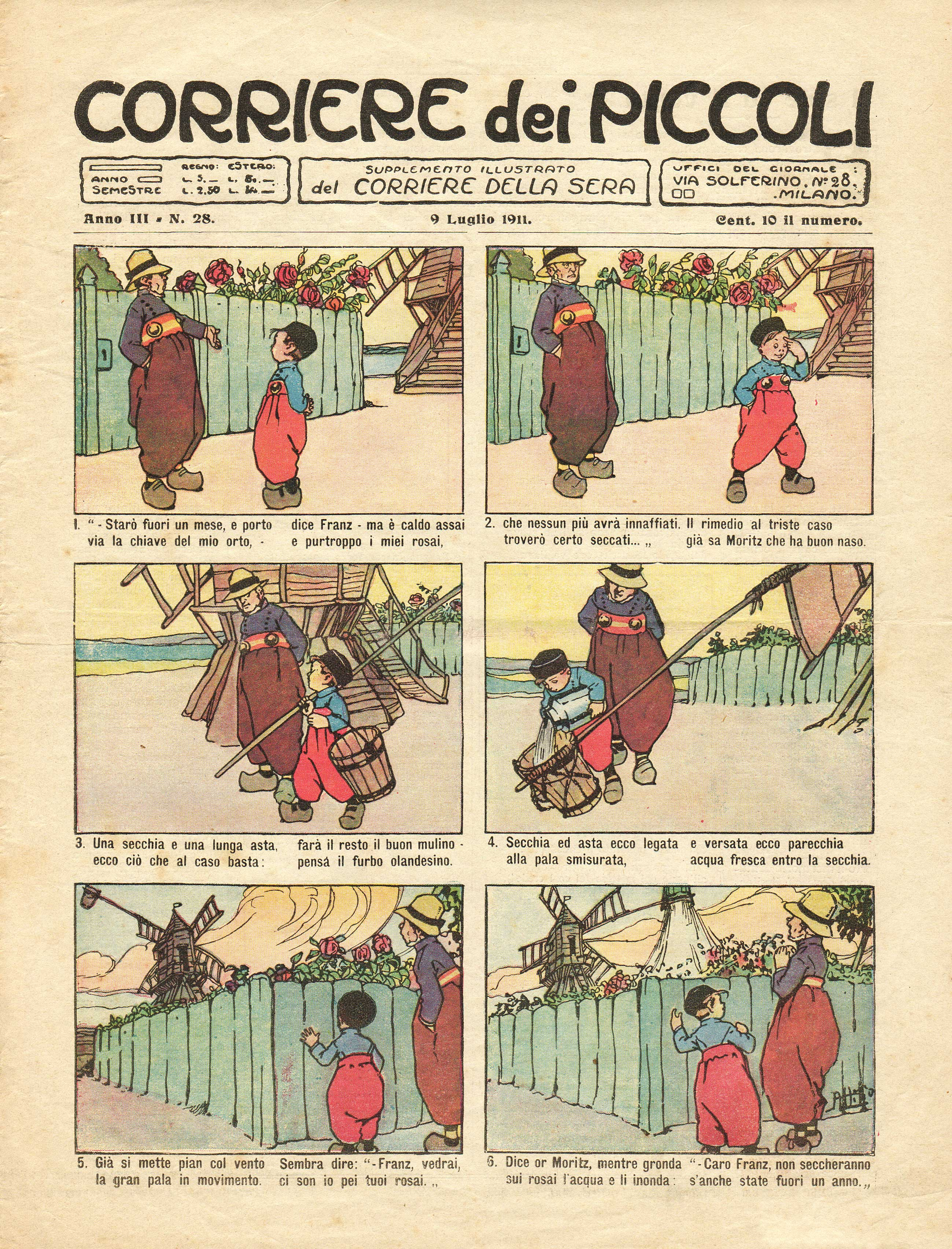
A weekly magazine published for children from 1908 to 1995 in the Italian style, with the caption appearing below each panel.

In the 1930s, to support herself, she wrote for many women's magazines, sometimes using the pseudonyms of Donna Rosetta and Lyra, giving advice on beauty, clothes, etc. Under the pseudonym Nonna Anna (Grandmother Anna), she wrote for the comic book Corriere dei Piccoli (Courier of the Little Ones) for young readers.

=== World War II years ===
After 8 September 1943, she joined the Italian Resistance and in 1946 her writing appeared in Cose d'ieri, reminding Italian readers of the need to continue their efforts to battle inequality and the lack of equal rights. In this way, she seemed to connect her early Risorgimento ideals with women's emancipation and Resistance.

=== Death ===
Anna Franchi died in Milan, 4 December 1954, having authored at least 44 volumes of novels, short stories and essays. Among the many magazines that she wrote for were: La Nazione, La Lombardia, Il Secolo XX, La Lettura, Nuovo Giornale di Firenze, Lavoro di Genova, Italy of the People of Milan, Corriere dei Piccoli, Gazzetta del popolo di Roma, Corriere toscano and others.

She was buried in her hometown of Livorno.

The Anna Franchi collection is kept at the Documentation and Visual Research Centre in the Labronica Library in Livorno. In addition, 12 handwritten essays are kept in the Archives of the Elvira Badaracco Foundation and dedicated to the author for the study of the Macchiaioli painters.

== Selected works ==
According to Gigli, Franchi has been credited with "13 volumes of history; 4 volumes of art; 8 theatrical comedies, with 4 successfully performed;15 volumes of work for adults;18 volumes of literature for children; and 50 years of journalistic activity." Selected titles include the following.

=== Children's books ===
- Cyril as a regiment: scenes from military life, drawings by Carlo Chiostri, Salani, Florence 1900.
- The travels of a lead soldier, drawings by Carlo Chiostri, Salani, Florence 1901.
- Last king. Novella senza principle, Sonzongo, Milan 1919.
- The gatekeeper's blackbird, with illustrations by Gino Baldo, Sonzogno, Milan 1920.
- Steel spurs, Caddeo, Milan 1920.
- The voice of the winds, illustrations by Enrico Mauro Pinochi, Nugoli, Milan 1922.
- Livingstone through Africa, illustrations by Gustavino, Paravia, Turin 1924.
- Fairies and geniuses masters of the world, drawings by Maria de Matteis, Salani, Florence 1926.
- Tardo Pie's journey around his house, drawings by Carlo Chiostri, Salani, Florence 1927.
- In the fairy gardens, drawings by Tilde Ragni, Salani, Florence 1928.
- Pinocchio with the fairy with turquoise hair, drawings by Ezio Anichini, Salani, Florence 1929.
- Pinocchio among the savages, drawings by Carlo Chiostri, Salani, Florence 1930.
- Simple life by Pippo Duranti. Novel, illustrations by Bruno Angoletta, Corbaccio dall'Oglio, Milan 1941.
- David Livingstone, illustrations by Gustavino, Paravia, Turin 1944.
- Kikiricò the big chicken. Children's novel, illustrations by Fucilli, Valsecchi, Milan 1944.
- Beyond the earth. Children's novel, illustrations by Fucilli, Valsecchi, Milan 1945.
- Children speak to you of Jesus, plates by Beato Angelico, Allegranza, Milan 1946.
- Gingillo, illustrations and tables out of text by Giuseppe Riccobaldi, Lombarda, Milan 1946.
- Discover the wonderful East, illustrations by Loredano Ugolini, Salani, Florence 1954.

=== Narrative works ===
- Dulcia-Tristia, Cappelli, Rocca S. Casciano 1897.
- Next the divorce, Remo Sandron, Milan 1902.
- An elect of the people, Remo Sandron, Milan 1909.
- The carboneria. Historical piece of the Italian Risorgimento, Soc. Editoriale Milanese, Milan 1910.
- From the memories of a priest, Remo Sandron, Milan 1910.
- La Giovine Italia. Popular story, Soc. Editoriale Milanese, Milan 1911.
- Mother. Romanzo, Milanese publishing house, Milan 1911.
- Nino Bixio. Popular story, Soc. Editoriale Milanese, Milan 1911.
- The son at war, Treves, Milan 1917.
- Ironie, Battistelli, Florence 1919.
- Who sings for love. Novelle, Treves, Milan 1920.
- For the one who will come, Caddeo, Milan 1921.
- On the chain, Treves, Milan 1922.
- The apple pie, Treves, Milan 1927.
- Catherine de 'Medici queen of France. History, Ceschina, Milan 1933.
- Gift of love, Treves, Milan 1933.
- Maria Teresa d'Austria, Ceschina, Milan 1934.
- Flight of swallows, Treves, Milan 1936.
- My life, Garzanti, Milan 1940.
- Nobody will know. Historical novel, Nerbini, Florence 1942.
- The shadow of the crime, Nerbini, Florence 1944.
- Saint Vincent de Paul, apostle of charity, Salani, Florence 1944.
- Fra diavolo, VIR, Milan 1945.
- Dust of the past, Garzanti, Milan 1953.

== Sources ==
- Giuliana Morandini, The voice that is in her. Anthology of Italian female fiction between the 19th and 20th centuries, Bompiani, Milan 1980.
- Elisabetta Rasy, Women and literature, Editori Riuniti, Rome 1984.
- Elisabetta Mondello, The new Italian. The woman in the press and culture of the twenty years, Editori Riuniti, Rome 1987.
- Annarita Buttafuoco, Women's Chronicles. Themes and moments of the emancipationist press in Italy from unity to fascism, Department of historical-social and philosophical studies of the University of Siena, Siena 1988.
- Michela de Giorgio, Italian women from Unity to today, Laterza, Rome-Bari 1992.
- Lucilla Gigli, The political passion of a writer. Notes for a biography of Anna Franchi, in Living as protagonists. Women between politics, culture and social control, edited by Patrizia Gabrielli, Carocci, Rome 2001.
- Anna Di Russo, Anna Franchi: a bibliographical path, three-year degree thesis in modern and contemporary literature, supervisor Marina Zancan, University of Rome "La Sapienza," Faculty of Humanities, Academic Year 2002–2003.
- Elisabetta De Troja, Anna Franchi: indocile writing, Florence University Press, 2016.
