= Badaracco =

Badaracco is a surname. Notable people with the surname include:

- Elvira Badaracco (1911–1994), Italian politician, socialist, writer and feminist activist
- Giovanni Raffaele Badaracco (1648–1717), Italian painter
- Giuseppe Badaracco (1588–1657), Italian painter
- Joseph L. Badaracco (born 1948), American author and academic
