= Lobato =

Lobato (which means "wolfling" in Spanish and Portuguese). Notable people with the surname include:

- Chano Lobato (1927–2009), Spanish flamenco singer
- Cristian Lobato (born 1989), Spanish footballer
- Edson Lobato, Brazilian scientist, 2006 World Food Prize recipient
- Elvira Lobato, Brazilian journalist
- Gilmar Lobato da Rocha (born 1973), Brazilian footballer
- Josep Lobató (born 1977), Spanish Catalan radio and television presenter
- Juan José Lobato (born 1988), Spanish cyclist
- Kirstin Lobato, see Trials of Kirstin Lobato
- Lúcia Lobato (born 1965), East Timorese politician
- Marcelo Lobato, member of Brazilian band O Rappa
- Mirta Zaida Lobato (born 1948), Argentine historian
- Monteiro Lobato (1882–1948), Brazilian writer
- Nelida Lobato (1934–1982), Argentine dancer and actress
- Nicolau dos Reis Lobato (1952–1978), East Timorese politician and national hero
- Rita Lobato (1866–1954), first woman to practice medicine in Brazil
- Rogerio Lobato (born 1949), East Timorese politician
- Rosa Lobato de Faria (1932–2010), Portuguese actress and writer
- Rubén Lobato (born 1978), Spanish cyclist
- Tammy Lobato (born 1971), Australian politician

== See also ==
- Lovato (disambiguation)
