= Lobato (disambiguation) =

Lobato is a surname.

Lobato or Lobatos may also refer to:

- Lobato, Paraná, a municipality in the state of Paraná, Brazil
- Mathias Lobato, a municipality in the state of Minas Gerais, Brazil
- Gonçalves Lobato Airport, in Viseu, Portugal
- Monteiro Lobato, São Paulo, a municipality in Brazil named after the writer
- Presidente Nicolau Lobato International Airport, in East Timor, named after the politician
- Lobatos, Colorado, a community in the United States

== See also ==
- Lovato
