= Alvira =

Alvira is a name. It is a Spanish surname; as a given name, it is sometimes considered a variant of Elvira. Notable people with the name include:

== Given name ==
- Alvira Hazzard (1898–1953), American writer, poet, educator and playwright
- Alvira Khan Agnihotri, Indian 21st century film producer
- Alvira Sullivan (1848–1947), common-law wife of American Old West lawman Virgil Earp

== Surname ==
- José María Alvira (1864–1938), Spanish composer
- Juan Diego Alvira (born 1976), Colombian journalist
- Rafael Alvira (1942–2024), Spanish philosopher
- Tomás Alvira (1906–1992), Spanish educator, see List of Opus Dei saints and beatified people#Servants of God

== Fictional characters ==
- Alvira Castillo-Del Valle, a main character in the television series Mara Clara (2010 TV series), played by Dimples Romana
- Alvira Chaudhary, a recurring character in the television series Humsafars, played by Vibha Chibber
