= Orazio de Ferrari =

Italian painter (1606–1657)

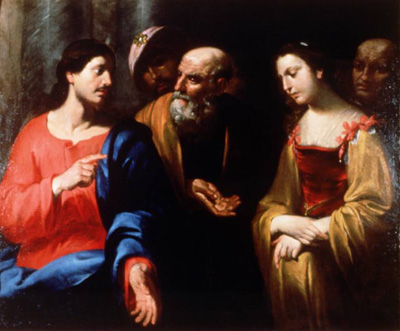
Christ and the adultress, attributed to Orazio de Ferrari

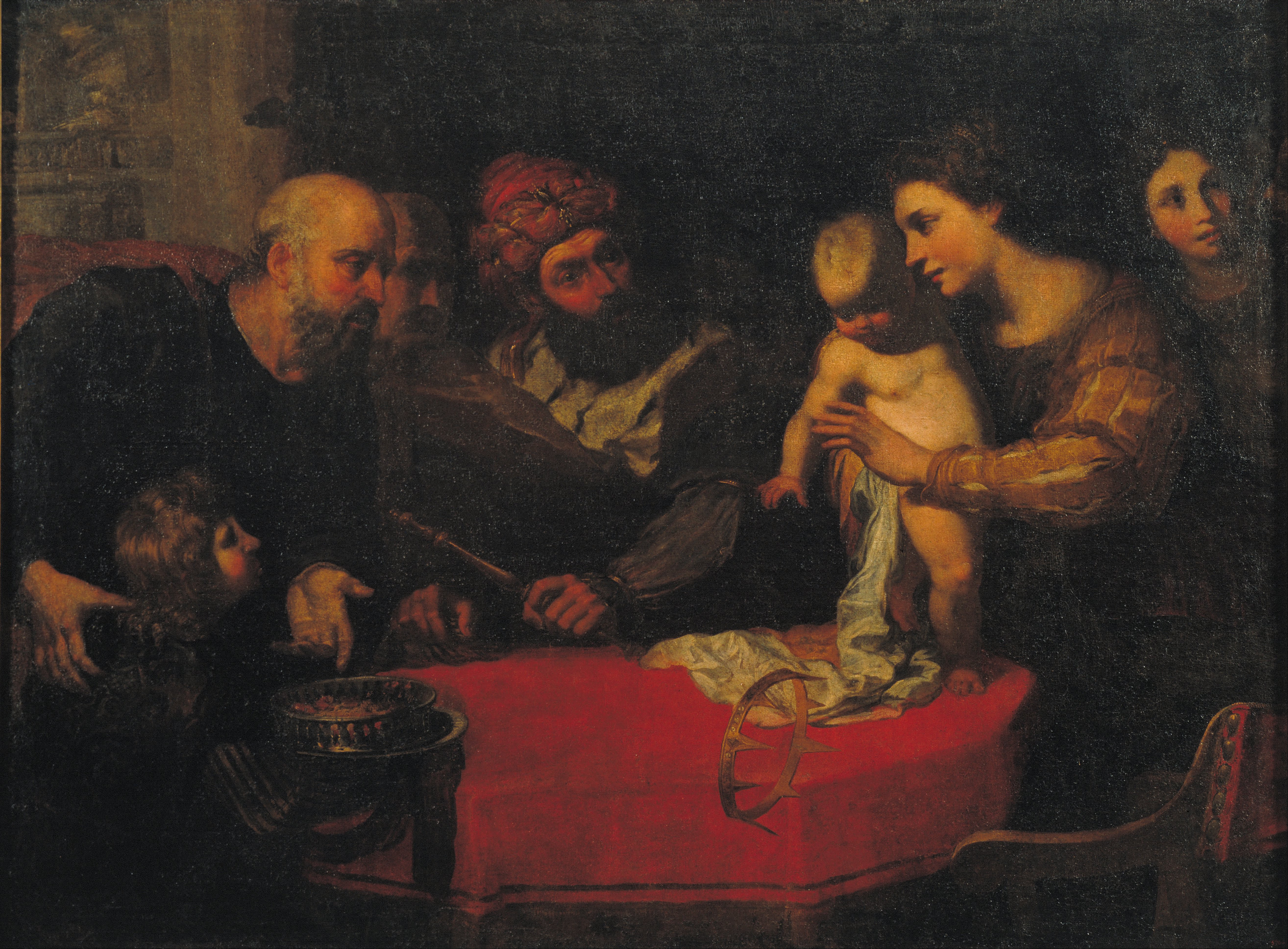
The Child Moses Throws down Pharaoh's Crown, Museu Nacional d'Art de Catalunya

Orazio de Ferrari (1606–1657) was an Italian artist, active in the Baroque period, born in Voltri, a suburb of Genoa. de Ferrari was a pupil of Giovanni Andrea Ansaldo. He was a member of the family of Genoese artists, with surnames de Ferrari, which also included Giovanni Andrea de Ferrari and Gregorio De Ferrari. During the 17th century, he painted murals in the chapel and many of the state rooms of the Royal Palace in Monaco.
