= Elvir =

Male given name

- Gender: Male

Other gender
- Feminine: Elvira

Origin
- Meaning: Happy, spear, truth
- Region of origin: Europe

Other names
- Variant form: Alvir

Elvir is both a given name and a surname. It is the male equivalent to the female name Elvira and holds the same meaning of happiness, spear, and truth.

In the Balkans, Elvir is popular among Bosniaks in the former Yugoslav nations, likely due to the popularity of the name Elvira among Bosniak women. By dropping the a, it becomes the male equivalent, which aligns with the naming conventions in these countries.

As a surname, Elvir is also popular among Hondurans.

== Given name ==
- Elvir Baljić (born 1974), Bosnian football manager
- Elvir Bolić (born 1971), Bosnian footballer
- Elvir Čolić (born 1986), Bosnian retired footballer
- Elvir Duraković (born 2000), Bosnian footballer
- Elvir Gigolaj (born 1992), Bosnian retired footballer
- Elvir Hadžić (born 1999), Bosnian footballer
- Elvir Ibišević (born 1998), Bosnian footballer
- Elvir Kafedžić (born 1982), Bosnian retired footballer
- Elvir Koljić (born 1995), Bosnian footballer
- Elvir Krehmić (born 1973), Bosnian retired athlete
- Elvir Laković Laka (born 1969), Bosnian rock musician
- Elvir Maloku (born 1996), Albanian footballer
- Elvir Mekić (born 1981), Macedonian musician
- Elvir Melunović (born 1979), Swiss footballer
- Elvir Muriqi (born 1979), Kosovar-Albanian boxer
- Elvir Omerbegovic (born 1979), German entrepreneur
- Elvir Ovčina (born 1976), Bosnian retired basketball player
- Elvir Rahimić (born 1976), Bosnian retired footballer

== Surname ==
- Dunia Elvir (born 1989), Honduran-American television journalist
- Jorge Elvir Honduran politician
- Omar Elvir (born 1989), Honduran football player
- Samuel Elvir (born 2001), Honduran football player
