= Bartolomeo Bassi =

Italian painter

Bartolomeo Bassi (early 1600s decade – 1640s) was an Italian painter active in the early-Baroque period, mainly in his hometown of Genoa. He was a disciple of Giovanni Andrea Ansaldo, and painted quadratura. He died at the age of 40.
