= Lovato =

- Language: Italian

Origin
- Meaning: "Like a wolf"
- Region of origin: Northern Italy

Other names
- Variant forms: Levato, Levati, Levito, Levetto, Leveti

Lovato is a surname of northern Italian origin. It derives from the Late Latin personal name Lupatus, derivative of Latin lupus, meaning "wolf".

People with the name include:

- Demi Lovato (born 1992), American singer and actress
- Frank Lovato Jr. (born 1963), American jockey
- Franz Lovato (1923–2018), Austrian field hockey player
- Lovato Lovati (1241–1309), Italian scholar, judge, and humanist
- Matteo Lovato (born 2000), Italian footballer
- Rafael Lovato Jr. (born 1983), American jiu-jitsu practitioner and mixed martial artist
- Rick Lovato (born 1992), American football long snapper
- Roberto Lovato (born 1963), American journalist and commentator
- Tony Lovato (born 1980), American singer and guitarist with the band Mest

== See also ==
- Lobato (disambiguation)
