= Elvira Olivas =

Mexican politician

- Born: 28 October 1935 (age 90); State of Mexico, Mexico
- Occupation: Politician
- Political party: PRI

María Elvira Olivas Hernández (born 28 October 1935) is a Mexican politician from the Institutional Revolutionary Party. In 2012 she served as Deputy of the LXI Legislature of the Mexican Congress representing the State of Mexico.
