= Gregorio De Ferrari =

Italian painter (c.1647–1726)

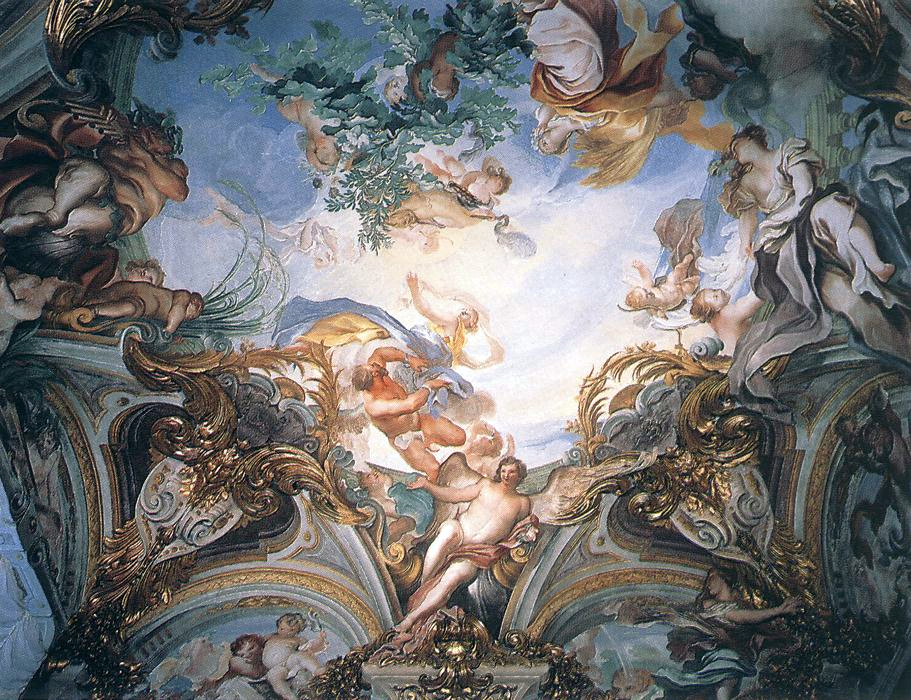
Summer, Fresco, 1680s

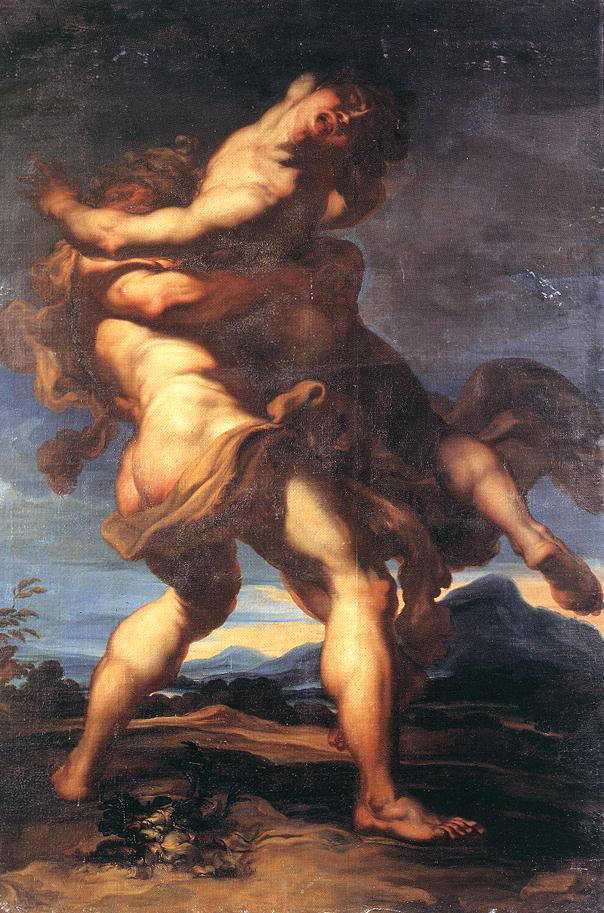
Hercules and Antaeus, oil painting, 1690s

Gregorio de Ferrari (c. 1647–1726) was an Italian Baroque painter of the Genoese School.

== Biography ==
De Ferrari was born in Porto Maurizio. He came to Genoa to study law but instead became a painter. He apprenticed with Domenico Fiasella from 1664 to 1669, and in this period, he may have painted in the style of Giovanni Andrea de Ferrari and Giovanni Battista Casone. He assisted Fiasella on the altarpiece St Clare Repulsing the Saracens (1667) for the parish church in Montoggio.

=== Parma ===
He travelled to Parma (staying from 1669 to 1673), where he worked in quadratura frescoes. It was here that he abandoned Fiasella's monumental style in favour of a more characteristic, lyrical style. He also made copies of Correggio's frescoes in the dome of the Parma cathedral, two of which – Rest on the Flight to Egypt and Virgin with St. Jerome and the Magdalene – were later listed as the property of Anton Raphael Mengs. During this time he may have exchanged ideas with Giovanni Battista Gaulli and Andrea Carlone, both of whom informed his style of work as evidenced by certain qualities adopted after his return to Genoa, such as graceful elongations and vertical spiral movements of the figures, which in turn suggests additional influence by the sculptors Filippo Parodi and Bernardo Schiaffino.

=== Return to Genoa ===
Gregorio made two works inspired by Correggio, St. Francis Comforted by an Angel and the Rest on the Flight to Egypt, dated from 1674 to 1675. He ultimately joined his father-in-law, Domenico Piola, in the prolific studio known as Casa Piola, which was founded in the 1660s. They were both active in the decoration of the Basilica della Santissima Annunziata del Vastato. They worked in styles that blended Cortona, Correggio, and Castiglione's styles.

In 1674, he painted the Glory of St Gaestano in a vault in the church of San Siro, and it is known that he received payment in 1676 for a treatment of the Glory of St Andrew in an adjoining vault. Later, in 1681, he painted St Clare Repulsing the Saracens, a "...dramatic work, with flickering light and twisting draperies." (Turner 1996, 9)

During the 1680s, Gregorio joined Andrea Seghizzi, who worked as quadraturista, to fresco several ceilings in the Palazzo Balbi-Senarega, and produced a preliminary sketch for architectural decoration and allegorical figures. In 1682, he was commissioned to paint two works (St Lawrence and St Stephen) in the Basilica della Santissima Annunziata del Vastato.

During the Bombardment of Genoa, he frescoed an Allegory of Time and sculpted a frieze in the drawing room of the Villa Gropallo. He later frescoed two vaults of the Palazzo Rosso to accompany two rooms completed by Piola. By 1689, he had frescoed the Brignole Sale drawing room with the Myth of Phaeton and painted a small cupola fresco in its chapel (both since destroyed). Gregorio and Piola worked in the same ornamental style, but differed in that, while Piola delineated each figure in his composition clearly, Gregorio took interest in "arranging twisting, elongating figures to soar through space in a swirl of arms, legs and draperies." (ibid., 8) He worked with Piola again in the Palazzo Granello, where he frescoed two rooms with Cupid and Psyche and Neptune and Amphitrite.

Circa 1690, Gregorio frescoed a large vault in the Santi Giacomo e Filippo with an Assumption of the Virgin. He also designed the surrounding quadratura, which was frescoed by Francesco Costa. This creative treatment of the subject was appreciated by the commander of the French fleet, Jacques Bailli de Noailles, who asked Gregorio to work in Marseille. Here he worked from 1692 to 1694, painting decorative frescoes and canvases with his son Lorenzo, after which he returned to Genoa.

In 1694, he was commissioned to fresco the vault of San Paolo in Campetto (since destroyed), where he painted a treatment of The Glory of Saint Paul. Five years later, he was possibly commissioned to paint the Death of Saint Scholastica and the Virgins and Souls in Purgatory, for which he was paid in 1703. He is known to have restored Andrea Ansaldo's dome in the Basilica della Santissima Annunziata del Vastato between 1700 and 1705, his work being evident in some of the painted figures.

In his later years, he turned to modelling and colouring paper papier-mâché and plaster figures. His later paintings, such as the Pool of Bethesda, tended to be smaller in scale, often of landscapes with architectural details. His last fresco decoration was for the cupola, apse and chapels in the SS. Camillo e Croce, most of which were completed between 1715 and 1726 with the help of Lorenzo. Surviving drawings attest to his role in designing the lunette in the apse, Heraklios Carrying the Cross to Jerusalem.

=== Legacy ===
His method of completing a painting – slowly, piece by piece – can be seen in paintings such as Moses Striking the Rock and the Virgin of Lepanto, with their varied figure scale and panoramic setting, both of which he completed with his son, Lorenzo.

Like Piola, Gregorio also designed for various media. It is possible he offered designs for Filippo Parodi's Morosoni tomb in the Tolentini in Venice, and he designed a frontispiece portrait of Francesco Invrea which was engraved by Martial Desbois.

He passed his skill in composing intricate quadratura to his students, Francesco Costa, Imperiale Bottini, and his son Lorenzo.

His Death of Santa Scolastica in San Stefano of Genoa is considered his masterpiece. Among the children of Gregorio and his wife, Margherita Piola, was the painter Lorenzo de' Ferrari, as well as his lesser-known brother, an art restorer named Giuseppe.
