= Trials of Kirstin Lobato =

American woman wrongly convicted of murder

Kirstin Blaise Lobato is an American woman from Nevada who was exonerated for the July 2001 murder and mutilation of Duran Bailey, a homeless man from St. Louis who was living in Las Vegas at the time of his death. At her first trial in May 2002, she was convicted of first-degree murder and sentenced from 40 to 100 years in prison. In a 2006 retrial, she was convicted of the lesser charges of voluntary manslaughter and sentenced to 13 to 45 years. Lobato's case gained significant notoriety due to the publication of new evidence in 2013, leading Nevada's Eighth Judicial District Court to declare her exonerated and issue a formal "certificate of innocence."

On December 29, 2017, Lobato was ordered to be released from the Nevada Department of Corrections. It was reported on January 2, 2018, that Lobato would spend another year in prison for an unrelated incident, yet on January 3 the same judge who had ordered Lobato's original release, ordered her released on that matter as well, citing the time Lobato had already served.

Lobato was released from the Clark County Detention Center at about 2 pm on January 3, 2018. After being imprisoned for 11 years and three months since her pre-trial bail was revoked following her convictions on October 6, 2006, Lobato told reporters she wanted to go "shopping" and "get coffee."

== Accusations ==
Beginning in late May 2001, Kirstin Lobato, then 18, began telling numerous friends in Las Vegas and her hometown of Panaca that a large black man tried to rape her at a Budget Suites Hotel on Boulder Highway in east Las Vegas. Lobato was consistent in telling these people that she fended off the attempted sexual assault by using a pocket knife she carried for self-defense, to try to cut her attacker's penis. From late May to July 4, 2001 she told at least nine different people about the Budget Suites attack.

On July 8, 2001, the mutilated corpse of Duran Bailey, a homeless man, was found on the opposite side of Las Vegas. Lobato was charged with the crime more than ten days later, after one of Lobato's friends informed police of her account of the sexual assault that supposedly occurred two months before. During a police interrogation, Lobato acknowledged stabbing a man in the groin, and police believed this constituted a confession to Bailey's murder, while Lobato claimed to be describing her attack.

== First trial ==
While prosecutors expected Lobato to plead not guilty by reason of self-defense, Lobato denied committing the crime entirely; she even refused a plea deal offering a 3-year prison sentence on the charge of manslaughter. She insisted that she was at home in Panaca, Nevada, nearly 200 miles (320 kilometers) from Las Vegas, on July 8, 2001, and her family confirmed that. Her attorneys also attempted to discount her supposed confession. However, prosecutors contended that Lobato was a known methamphetamine user and that she killed Bailey during a dispute over sex and drugs. During the May 2002 trial, Lobato testified to her innocence, and her attorneys brought in experts who also stated that Lobato could not have committed the crime based on physical evidence, but Judge Valorie Vega suppressed much of the experts' testimony. In their closing statement, Lobato's attorneys compared her trial to the Salem witch trials. After deliberating through the night, the jury convicted Lobato of first-degree murder. On August 27, 2002, she was sentenced to 40 to 100 years in prison.

== Appeals, second trial and ongoing litigation ==
Over two years after her conviction, on September 3, 2004, Lobato's conviction was reversed; the Supreme Court of Nevada ruled that her attorneys were unable to cross-examine a prosecution witness, who was a woman with whom Lobato was incarcerated while awaiting trial, regarding that witness's motivation for testifying for the government. Her case was remanded for a new trial. On October 6, 2006, she was convicted of voluntary manslaughter and sentenced to 13 to 45 years in prison.

Lobato's appeal of her conviction was denied by the Supreme Court of Nevada in October 2009.

In May 2010, Lobato filed a writ of habeas corpus petition that asserted 79 grounds for a new trial. Among those was her claim of actual innocence based on new evidence discovered after her trial proving she was in Panaca, Nevada, during the time when Bailey was killed. Judge Vega denied Lobato's petition in June 2011. Lobato appealed that ruling to the Nevada Supreme Court on August 1, 2011.

In February 2011 Lobato filed a post-conviction petition for DNA testing of crime scene evidence. The Innocence Project agreed to pay for the testing if Lobato's petition were granted. The petition was opposed by the Clark County District Attorney's Office, and denied by Judge Vega. Lobato appealed that ruling to the Nevada Supreme Court, which on January 12, 2012 dismissed her appeal on the basis that Judge Vega's ruling was not appealable under NRS 176.0918.

After Lobato's DNA testing petition was denied, an online petition called for the Nevada courts to test the crime scene evidence in Lobato's case, claiming it could prove her innocence.

A book about the case, entitled Kirstin Blaise Lobato's Unreasonable Conviction, written by Hans Sherrer, was published in May 2008 by the Justice Institute. A second edition was published in November 2010. As of March 17, 2015 more than 53,000 copies have been downloaded at no charge from the website, Justice Denied.

Retired FBI agent Steve Moore, noted for his advocacy on behalf of Amanda Knox, has referred to the case documents in the Lobato case as, "...complete and utter bullshit." Moore believes that Duran Bailey might have been killed and mutilated sexually by someone else, a woman who had said one week prior that Bailey had raped her.

After having been charged with misconduct and publicly reprimanded by the Nevada Commission on Judicial Discipline, Judge Valorie Vega, the judge in both of Lobato's trials, did not run for re-election in 2014, stepping down from the bench in January 2015.

On September 9, 2014 the Nevada Supreme Court, sitting en banc, heard oral arguments related to Lobato's habeas petition. The case was "Submitted for Decision. En Banc", and the Court's ruling was pending as of April 1, 2015.

On December 19, 2017, Judge Stefany Miley, a District Judge in Las Vegas, granted a new trial for Lobato.

On December 29, 2017 Chief Judge Elizabeth Gonzalez ordered Lobato released from the Nevada Department of Corrections. It was reported on Jan 2, 2018, that while in prison, Lobato had been convicted of conspiracy to commit sexual contact with a prisoner and instead of being released, was to be transferred to the Clark County Detention Center to serve an additional year in jail on those charges. On Jan 3, Judge Gonzalez ordered Lobato be released immediately, citing time served.

Lobato was released from the Clark County Detention Center at about 2 pm on January 3, 2018. After being imprisoned for 11 years and three months since her pre-trial bail was revoked following her convictions on October 6, 2006, Lobato told reporters she wanted to go "shopping" and get "coffee."

On December 12, 2024, a civil trial jury found Las Vegas police and two detectives, Thomas Thowsen and James LaRochelle, now retired, fabricated evidence during their investigation and intentionally inflicted emotional distress upon Lobato. The panel determined that Lobato should receive $34 million in compensatory damages from the department and $10,000 in punitive damages from each former detective.

== See also ==
- Exculpatory evidence
- False confession
- Innocent prisoner's dilemma
- List of wrongful convictions in the United States
- Prosecutorial misconduct
