= Rafael Alvira =

Spanish philosopher (1942–2024)

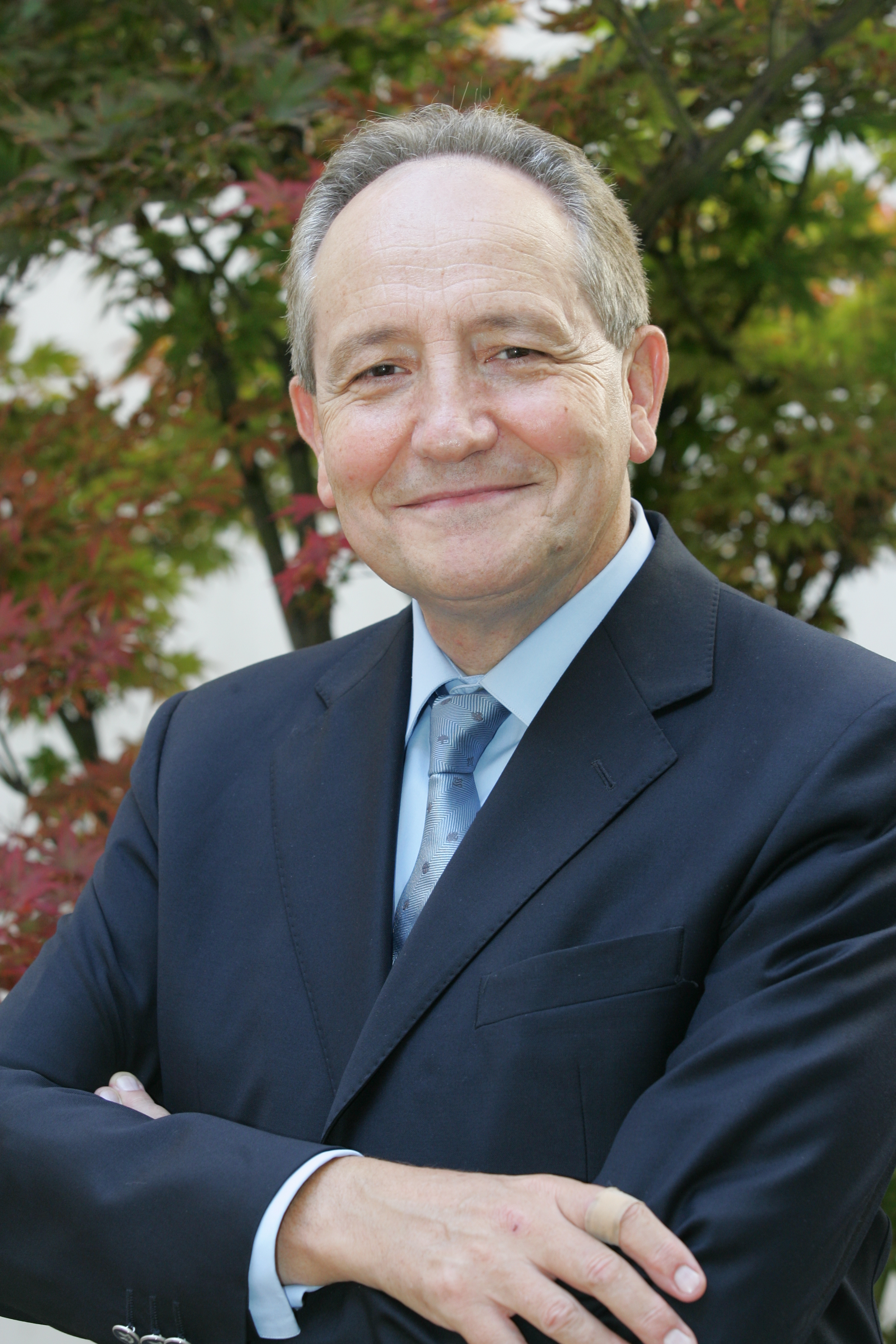
- Born: 24 October 1942; Madrid, Spain
- Died: 4 February 2024 (aged 81); Madrid, Spain
- Occupations: Philosopher, professor

Rafael Alvira (24 October 1942 – 4 February 2024) was a Spanish philosopher. He died on 4 February 2024, at the age of 81.

== Biography ==
Rafael Alvira was born on 24 October 1942 in the city of Madrid. At the age of eighteen, he began his studies in Philosophy at the University of Navarra and later obtained doctorates in Philosophy from the Complutense University of Madrid and the Pontifical Gregorian University in Rome. He conducted study stays in Germany (two years at the University of Münster), Italy (two years at the Lateran Pontifical University), Austria, France, and the United States.

In 1966, he became an assistant professor at the Complutense University and in 1975, he became a full professor of Metaphysics. In 1980, he moved to the Faculty of Philosophy and Letters at the University of Navarra, where he held numerous administrative positions over the years, including the Deanship. He also taught at the Diplomatic School of Spain, the Complutense University, and the Menéndez Pelayo International University (Santander). He was a founding member and director of the "Institute of Business and Humanism" at the University of Navarra.

As a visiting professor, he lectured at the University of Mendoza (Argentina), the University of the Republic (Montevideo, Uruguay), the Panamerican University (Mexico), the National University of Cuyo (Mendoza, Argentina), the University of Notre Dame (Indiana, United States), the University of the Andes (Santiago de Chile), and the University of Piura (Peru), among others.

He died in Madrid on 4 February 2024.

== Publications ==
- ¿Qué es la libertad?, Emesa, Madrid, 1976 (2ª edic. en México D.F.)
- La noción de finalidad, Eunsa, Pamplona, 1978.
- Reivindicación de la voluntad, Eunsa, Pamplona, 1988.
- Razón y libertad, Rialp, Madrid 1990 (editor y colaborador)
- El hombre: inmanencia y transcendencia, Universidad de Navarra, Pamplona, 1991 (editor y colaborador).
- La razón de ser hombre. Ensayo acerca de la justificación del ser humano, Rialp, Madrid, 1998.
- El lugar al que se vuelve. Reflexiones sobre la familia, Eunsa, Pamplona, 1998.
- Filosofía de la vida cotidiana, Rialp, Madrid, 1999.
- Sociedad civil. La democracia y su destino, Eunsa, Pamplona, 1999 (editor y colaborador).
- Humanidades para el siglo XXI, Eunsa, Pamplona, 2006 (en colaboración con Kurt Spang).
