= Loredano Ugolini =

Italian comic artist and animator

- Born: 17 December 1927 (age 98); Florence, Italy
- Occupation: Comics artist

Loredano Ugolini (born 17 December 1927) is an Italian comic artist and illustrator.

== Life and career ==
Born in Florence, Ugolini started his career in 1948, illustrating several book covers for the publisher Salani; there he became friends with the comic artist Erio Nicolò, a collaborator of the publishing house, who introduced him to the comics publisher Editrice Universo. He debuted as comic artist with some short stories published in Albi dell'Intrepido, and then he got a large success with the comic series Billy Bis, he co-created with Antonio Mancuso and which was released in the magazine Intrepido, and with Cristal, published in Il Monello.

In the following years Ugolini created and illustrated several series including Lobo Kid (with stories by Gian Luigi Bonelli, published by Sergio Bonelli Editore), Tony Gagliardo (another collaboration with Mancuso for Intrepido), Rox (with stories written by Raffaele D'Argenzio), as well as a number of comics for the British publisher Fleetway Publications. His son Simone is also a comics artist.
