= Palazzo Lomellini-Doria Lamba =

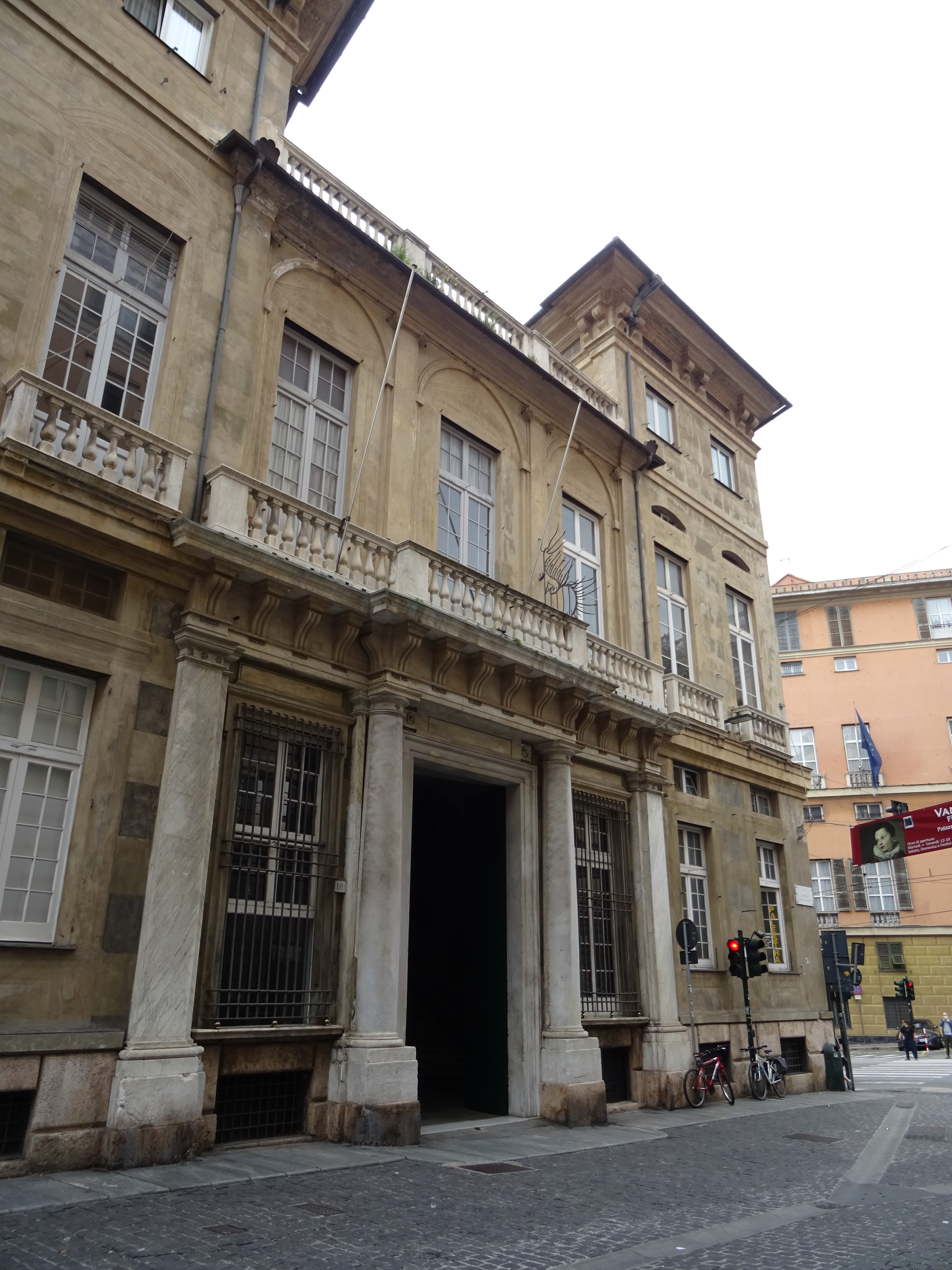
- Facade of the Palazzo Palazzo Lomellini-Doria Lamba in via Cairoli, 18
- Interactive map of the Palazzo Lomellini-Doria Lamba area
- Alternative names: Palazzo Stefano Lomellini

General information
- Status: In use
- Type: Palace
- Architectural style: Mannerist
- Location: Genoa, Italy, 18, Cairoli
- Coordinates: 44.41316°N 8.9297°E
- Construction started: 16th century
- Completed: 16th century

Design and construction
- Architect: Gregorio Petondi

UNESCO World Heritage Site
- Part of: Genoa: Le Strade Nuove and the system of the Palazzi dei Rolli
- Criteria: Cultural: (ii)(iv)
- Reference: 1211
- Inscription: 2006 (30th Session)

The Palazzo Lomellini-Doria Lamb', also called Palazzo Stefano Lomellini, is a building in Via Cairoli (Genoa) at number 18 in the historical centre of Genoa, included on 13 July 2006 in the list of the 42 palaces inscribed in the Rolli di Genova, which on that date became World Heritage by UNESCO.

== History and description ==
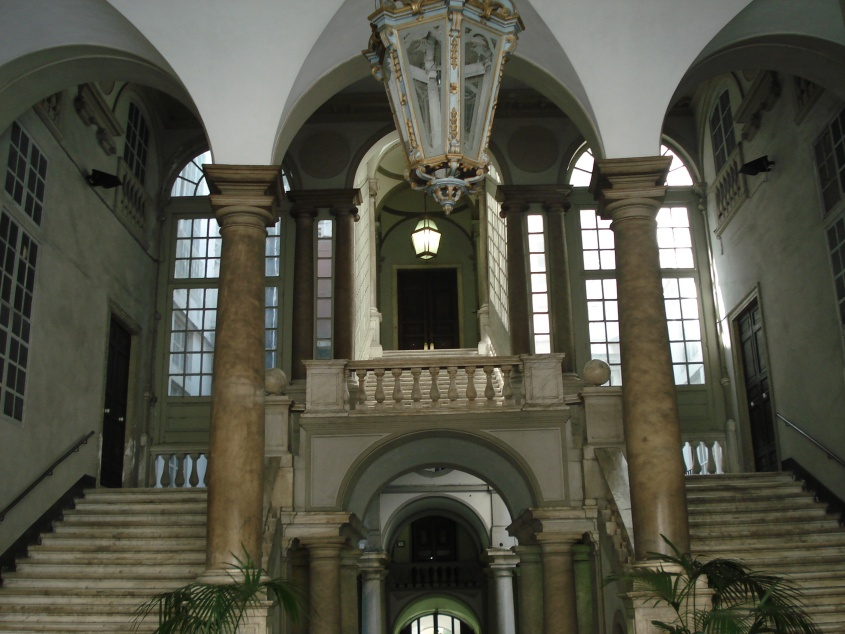
The palace atrium

Stefano Lomellini's palace was included in the rolls of Genoa from 1588 to 1664; it was, however, only the nucleus of the present building, which was renovated and enlarged by the architect Gregorio Petondi in 1776 for Gian Tommaso Balbi. It was the contemporary tracing of Strada Nuovissima 1778—1786, today's Via Cairoli), by the same Petondi, with an entrance from the salita dei Forni (today's Largo Zecca), through the annexation of two built plots that increased the palace to its present size, obtaining a double view of Via Lomellini and the new street. On this occasion it was provided with a double entrance (via Cairoli 18-via Lomellini 19), as was the adjoining building owned by Marco Lomellini. and its current facades were designed. Thus, the architect chose a scenographic and complex distributive solution, connecting the two atriums and the rooms on the upper floors, «renewing the splendour of that continuous architecture of the staircase that had been invented in Genoa in the 16th century, which Bartolomeo Bianco had multiplied in the palaces of via Balbi».

The palace, where the loggia of the Lomellini 'hotel' still existed in 1798, is now owned by the Doria Lamba family and houses offices and residences.

== Bibliography ==
=== Italian sources ===
- G. Ciotta (a cura di), Genova Strada Nuovissima : impianto urbano e architetture, Genova 2005
- Catalogo mostra Poleggi 2004.
- E. Poleggi (a cura di), L’invenzione dei Rolli. Genovà civiltà di palazzi, catalogo della mostra (Genova, Palazzo Tursi, 28 maggio – 7 settembre 2004), Milano 2004.
- E. Poleggi, Genova. Una civiltà di Palazzi, Cinisello Balsamo (Milano) 2002, pp. 171–173 (Palazzo di Gio. Tommaso Balbi (1775–1778))
- C. Altavista, Petondi, Giovanni Angelo Gregorio, ad vocem, in Dizionario Biografico degli italiani, vol. 82/2015.
