= Elvira Nosari =

Mexican writer, educator

Luisa Elvira Nosari Salgado (Uruapan, bapt. 25 January 1883 – ) was a Mexican educator, writer, playwright, and promoter of the education of Mexican women. She is considered a founder of Mexican feminism.

== Biography ==
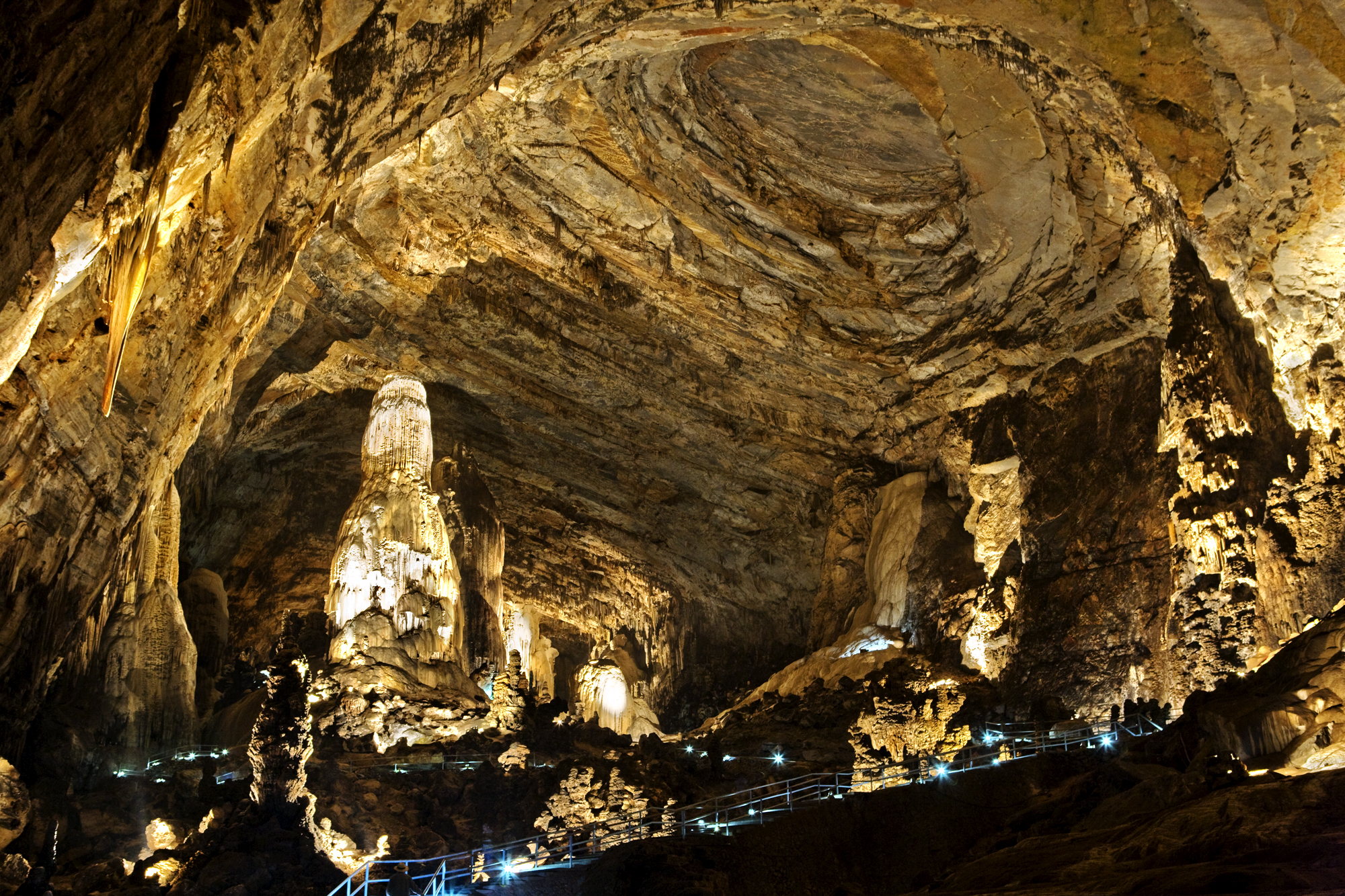
Grutas de Cacahuamilpa, Guerrero

Elvira Nosari was the daughter of Italian immigrant Giuseppe Nosari (known in Mexico as José Nosari or Nozari), a homeopathic doctor and entrepreneur who had been living in Mexico since the mid–1860s and was engaged in construction. In 1888, Giuseppe Nosari was granted a concession by the government from the state of Guerrero to exploit the Cacahuamilpa Caves.

Giuseppe Nosari died in Mexico in 1908, and his remains were repatriated to his hometown of Guastalla, Italy, where they lie in the communal cemetery. Within his project for the caves was the proposal to build a railway to the cave, with the main objective of facilitating access for both foreigners and Mexicans to admire the cave. As part of the promotion of the project and with the purpose of attracting visitors, Elvira Nosari wrote the work Un viaje a Cacahuamilpa at that time. She intended to stage this play at the National Theater, with Cacahuamilpa as the stage, to publicize what she considered to be a natural wonder of Mexico. The work was reproduced in the cave but it was not possible to carry out its objective, since her father ran out of money by investing everything in the project. She had to use her savings for the scenery used in the cave, losing the opportunity to cover the rent of the theater.

Elvira had four siblings: Elena, Enriqueta, Eugenia and José Gaudiano, all born in Mexico from the marriage of their father Giuseppe with María de la Paz Salgado, a Mexican native of Puebla.

=== Education ===
Elvira completed her studies at the Normal School for Teachers in Mexico City in 1898 and graduated in 1900 as a primary education teacher. In 1900, she received a scholarship to study in Europe and moved to study in Italy accompanied by Professor Silvina Jardón, taking a course in experimental psychology to specialize in special education with the teacher Maria Montessori. Upon returning, she wrote several educational books, such as Plane and Space Geography, other geometry books for didactic use in teaching mathematics, and a reading book for primary schools.

== Career path ==
=== Pedagogy ===
Elvira dedicated herself to studying different pedagogical methods, and even changed curricular contents in search of better teaching and knowledge acquisition. In 1915, she was director of the Normal School for Teachers and Arts and Crafts. During her administration, she criticized the traditional teaching method with the aim of introducing new modifications, such as the creation of subjects in various areas as an antecedent of an internationalist method, she also taught the subject of Experimental Psychology and managed the transfer of the Normal School to the building on Independence street.

Around 1919, Elvira participated in the campaign advocating for textbooks written by Mexican authors, forming part of the Society of Mexican Educational Authors, which strongly criticized the list of American books that were established as the main works for primary education by the Technical Commission of the General Directorate of Primary Education for the 1919–1920 cycle, and which were determined to be supplementary to the books written by Mexican teachers. This association achieved its objective by declaring the aforementioned list non-existent and designated new books; additionally, the Director of Elementary Schools resigned.

=== Literary and performance works ===
Nosari was a woman who defended her literary work. At an early age, with her father as an intermediary, she recorded the work Un viaje a Cacahuamilpa. In October 1899, she requested the right of ownership of literary and representational works for her work Jacinta or the martyr of the cave, a four-act drama, a statement that was ordered to be published in the Official Gazette on October 14, 1899. This work was later published under the title Jacinta: drama in a prologue and three acts by the publisher El siglo xx in 1917, which is in the Reserved Fund of the National Library of Mexico. There is a record of a letter that she wrote to the Minister of Public Instruction, outlining a strategy to have her work by Christopher Columbus accepted and published, expressing her intention to instruct the people. In her words:

I write for the people: for that social class, without education, that ignores what our ancestors did for the soil that shelters it (...)

Elvira Nosari addresses the issue of women within Mexican political movements, representing the role of a woman who leaves aside the traditional and social ideals of the time. She proposes the construction of her own identity, breaking gender roles and directly exhorts women to have an active participation in politics. From her works, she is considered one of the main contributors to feminism. She is also identified as part of the first generation of playwrights, along with Gertrudis Gómez, Teresa Farías, Laura Méndez, Mariana Peñaflores, Victoria González, Francisca Montes, and Encarnación Alcaraz. An interesting fact regarding Elvira Nosari is that for many years she used the male pseudonym Mario Dill in her texts.

- A trip to Cacahuamilpa, 1899.
- Wisp and Saint Elmo's Fires, 1899
- Jacinta or the martyr of the cave, 1899.
- The Penitentiary, 1900
- Christopher Columbus or The Discovery of America, 1906.
