= M. Maryan =

French writer (1847–1927)

Marie Rosalie Virginie Cadiou
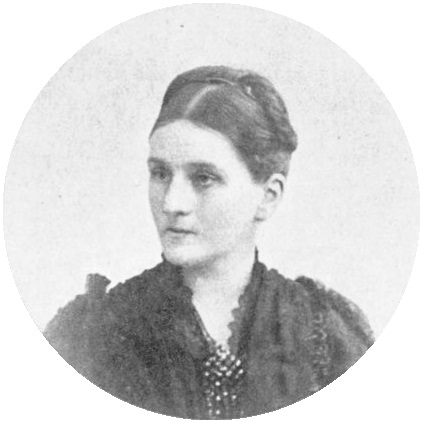
- Born: 21 December 1847; Brest, France
- Died: 28 January 1927 (aged 79); Brest
- Occupation: Writer
- Spouse: Charles-Albert Deschard (1836-1919)
- Children: Six
- Writing career
- Pen name: M. Maryan, Marie Deschard, Marie Cadiou
- Years active: 1878-1927
- Notable awards: Laureate of the Académie Française

Signature
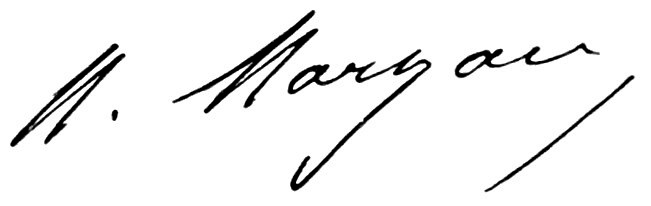

M. Maryan was the pseudonym used by Marie Rosalie Virginie Cadiou (1847-1927), a French novelist born in Brest who worked in Paris. She was a prolific author who wrote for young female readers.

Cadiou published her entire catalog of literary work under the pseudonym M. Maryan, which in English means "Mr. Maryan." The name was created early in her career by a random printing error of the first name of her maternal grandmother, Mary-Ann Kirkland, which was the pen name the young author had intended to use. Some of her work can now be found under her married name, Marie Deschard or Descard.

== Personal life ==
Cadiou (born 21 December 1847) was the daughter of a captain and mayor of Guipavas, niece of Admiral Thomas Louis, and sister of the writer Paul Cadiou. From her marriage to Charles-Albert Deschard (1836-1919) who was Commissioner General of the Navy, she had six children: Albert (Chief Commissioner of the Navy), Marthe, Marie (wife of Rear Admiral René Nielly), Paul (a battalion commander), André and Pierre.

Cadiou developed many charitable activities in her birthplace, Brest. While in Paris, she worked intensely at her writing, sometimes producing four novels a year, most intended for young girls.

She died 28 January 1927 in Brest at the age of 80.

== Publications ==
Cadiou was a frequent contributor to the Journal des Demoiselles, a Paris periodical for affluent girls aged 14 to 18, which devoted a portion of its editions to education and science as well as literature, fashion and theater. During her lifetime, her work was reproduced in many newspapers and translated into different languages. Some of her writings can be found under her other names: Maryan-M, or Marie Deschard.

Cadiou produced more than 100 known titles including both fiction and nonfiction and numerous title and editions are still in print, as of 2020.

=== Selected works of fiction ===
- Father's fault ("La faute du père"). Benziger, Einsiedeln 1926
- The heritage of Montligné ("La fortune des Montligné"). Benziger, Einsiedeln 1885
- Guénola. Narrative from Brittany ("Guénola"). Benziger, Einsiedeln 1913
- The home of the bachelor. Benziger, Einsiedeln 1889
- Hotel St. Francis. Novelle ("L'hôtel Saint François"). Schöningh, Paderborn 1891
- Marcia de Laubly. Novella ("Marcia de Laubly"). Pustet, Regensburg 1915
- Paula's heritage ("L'heritage de Paule"). Benziger, Einsiedeln 1891
- The dark side of a rich dowry. Benziger, Einsiedeln 1885

=== Selected works of nonfiction ===
- Feminism of all times ("Le feminisme de tous les temps.") Bloud & Barral, Paris 1900 (written with Gabrielle Béal)
- Background: know-how for young girls. ("Le fond et la forms. La savoir-vivre pour les jeune filles.") Bloud & Barral, Paris 1896

== Honors ==
Based on her work, she was given a distinguished title of Laureate by the Académie française even though she considered herself "lacking in literary ambition."
