= Lorenzo De Ferrari =

Italian painter

Lorenzo De Ferrari (14 November 1680 – 28 July 1744) was an Italian painter of the Baroque period, active mainly in his native city of Genoa.

== Biography ==
Lorenzo was the son of the painter Gregorio De Ferrari and Margherita Piola, the daughter of another famous Genoese painter, Domenico Piola. He studied by making copies of work by Guido Reni and Anthony van Dyck, and accompanied his father to Marseille at the age of twelve, where he worked as his assistant for two years. Upon their return to Genoa, it is also probable he assisted in the restoration of Andrea Ansaldo's dome in the Basilica della Santissima Annunziata del Vastato.

According to Jane Turner's The Dictionary of Art, his style was "...influenced by the graceful, elongated figures, spiraling movements and elaborate quadratura of his father." He was also influenced by the more refined and academic work of several contemporary Genoese artists who had worked in Rome, such as Paolo Girolamo Piola and Domenico Parodi. He often used elements established by the Piola family in his ceiling decoration, such as pairs of ignudi and corner ornaments.

His earliest dated work, Allegory in Honor of Doge Lorenzo Centurione, was completed in 1717 and engraved by Maxmilian Joseph Limpach. Its complexity attests to a high degree of skill when he began working with his father on the decoration of the church of Santi Camillo e Croce, where he painted in his father's style an altarpiece Saints Nicholas, Matthew and Lucy. He also collaborated with Gregorio in the decoration of the cupola, the Triumph of the Holy Cross (completed between 1715–1726). He also painted the lunette fresco, Heraclius Carrying the Cross to Jerusalem, simplifying his father's designs.

From 1720 to 1722, Lorenzo painted an altar piece, Virgin and child with Saints Joseph, Ignatius Loyola and Francis Xavier, for the Church of Santi Ignazio e Francesco Saverio. In the same period, to celebrate the canonization of Luigi Gonzaga and Stanislaus Kostka, he designed an ornamental structure erected in the Genoese church of the Gesú. Two years later, he completed frescoes in the nave of Santa Marta. Also in the 1720s he completed a vault in the Palazzo Pallavicini-Podesta-Bruzzo, which he worked on with Francesco Biggi, based on designs by P. G. Piola.

Lorenzo later executed a fresco, according to its style executed between 1730–34, based on the stories of Aeneas in the Palazzo Sauli. Some time afterwards, in 1734, he visited Rome, where he is said to have met the major painters Sebastiano Conca and Marco Benefial. Returning through Florence, he met Ignazio Hugford and Francesco Maria Niccolo Gaburri. The latter, who was Luogotenente of the Florentine Academy of Fine Arts, helped get him awarded an honorary membership (August 1, 1734). This trip, although short, greatly influenced Lorenzo as an artist and contribution his formation of a more intricate, Rococo style.

In 1736, he erected a series of elaborate structures, of which no trace remains today, in the Genoa Cathedral to celebrate the canonization of Catherine Fieschi Adorno. In the same year he collaborated with Giovanni Battista Natali on a series of frescoes in the gallery of the Palazzo Spinola, where the central medallion shows Venus and Bacchus with Cupid, all of which demonstrate his newly formed style.

Circa 1738, Lorenzo decorated four highly illusionistic frescoes in the church of Gesù, in the style of Domenichino. Around the same time, he completed a series of vault frescoes in the Palazzo Gio Carlo, painted to celebrate a Doria marriage. His final work before his death was the Galleria d'Oro in the Palazzo Spinola.

Never married, Lorenzo sometimes wore clerical garb and was nicknamed l'Abate de' Ferrari.
