= Elvira Pola Figueroa =

Mexican politician

- Born: 27 July 1957 (age 69); Chiapas, Mexico
- Occupation: Politician
- Political party: PRD

Elvira de Jesús Pola Figueroa (born 27 July 1957) is a Mexican politician from the Party of the Democratic Revolution. From 2009 to 2012, she served in the LXI Legislature of the Mexican Congress representing Chiapas' Third District.
