= Elvira Rodríguez Leonardi =

Argentine politician

National Senator
- In office 1952–1954
- Constituency: Córdoba

Elvira Rodríguez Leonardi de Rosales was an Argentine politician. She was elected to the Senate in 1951 as one of the first group of female parliamentarians in Argentina.

== Biography ==
In the 1951 legislative elections Rodríguez Leonardi was a Peronist Party candidate and one of six women elected to the Senate. Representing Córdoba, she sat on the Constitutional Affairs committee and served as secretary of the Budget and Finance committee. She resigned from the Senate in December 1954 due to her opposition to a bill legalising divorce. She was subsequently expelled from the Peronist Party and also prevented from returning to her previous job as a teacher.
