= Elvira Lobato =

Brazilian journalist

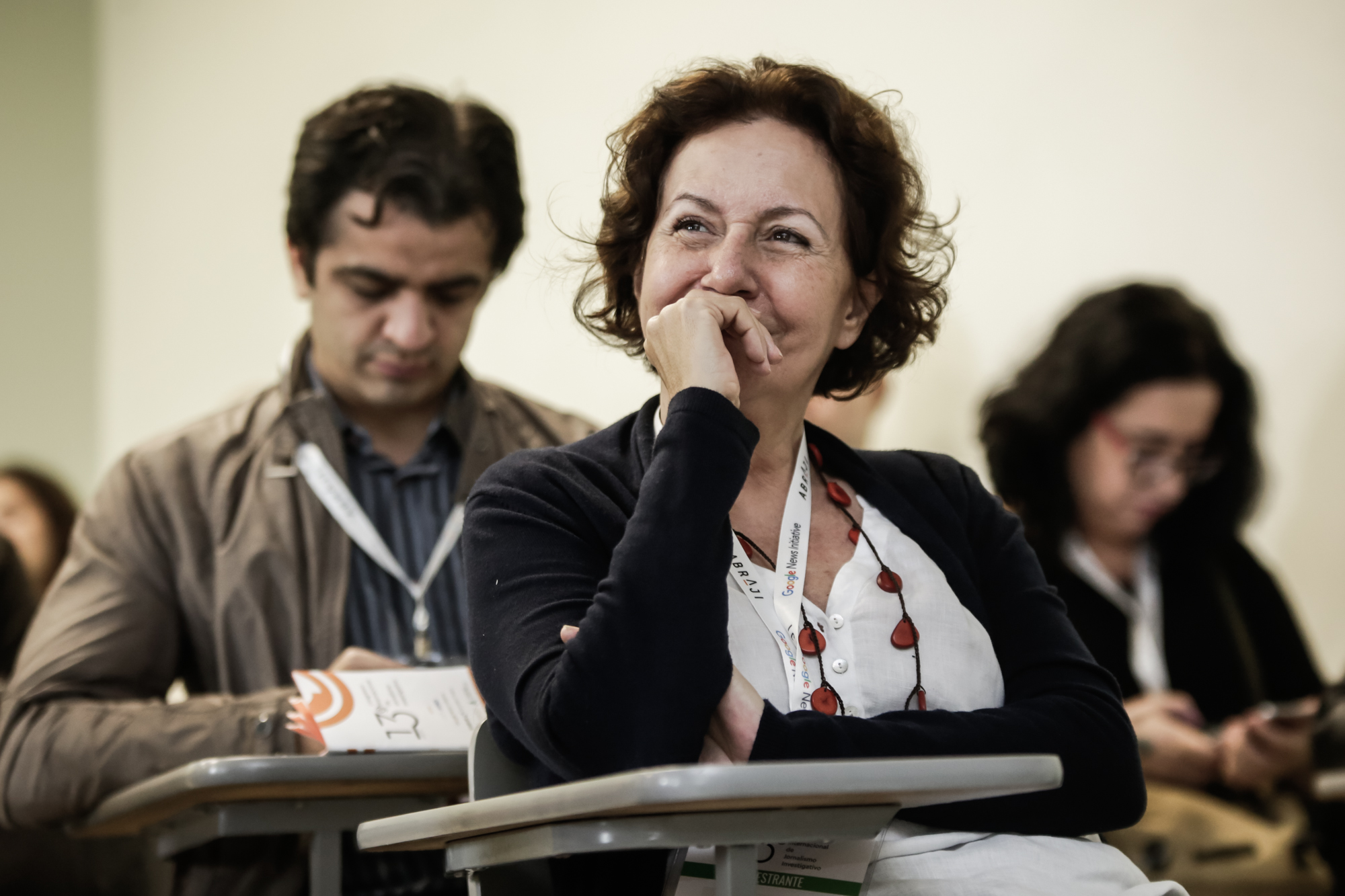
- Occupation: Journalist

Elvira Lobato is a Brazilian journalist. She has worked at Folha de S.Paulo for 25 out of 39 years in which she was a journalist; she retired in 2012. She was awarded some of the most prestigious prizes for journalists in Brazil, including Prêmio Esso, that she received in 2008 for an investigative series on the wealth of Igreja Universal. Because of this work, she has been threatened and publicly persecuted.

== Awards ==
- Congresso Internacional de Jornalismo Investigativo, 2016
- Troféu Mulher Imprensa, category "Repórter de site de notícias", 2012
- Prêmio Esso de Jornalismo, for "Universal chega aos 30 anos com império empresarial", Folha de S.Paulo, 2008
- Prêmio CNT de Jornalismo, for "Vícios de Gestão Afundaram Varig", Folha de S.Paulo, 2006
- Prêmio Imprensa Embratel, for "Teles negociam compra da Embratel para subir preços", Folha de S.Paulo, 2004
- Grande Prêmio Folha de Jornalismo, 1999 and 2004
