= Giovanni Raffaele Badaracco =

Italian painter (1648–1726)

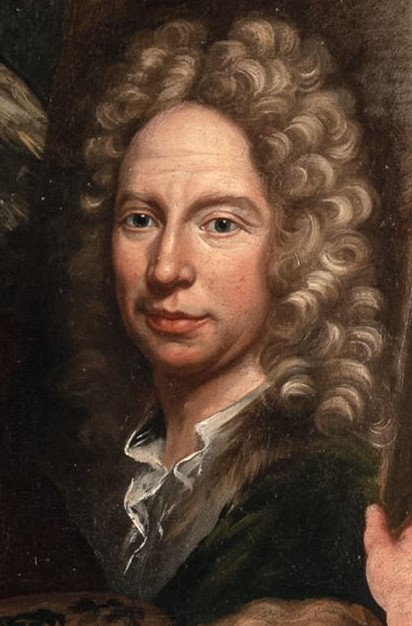
- Self-Portrait
- Born: 1648; Genoa, Republic of Genoa
- Died: 1726 (aged 77–78); Genoa, Republic of Genoa
- Education: Carlo Maratta
- Known for: Painting
- Movement: Baroque

Giovanni Raffaele Badaracco (1648 – 1726) was an Italian painter of the Baroque period. His work is now little known, yet the large number of paintings cited by Soprani, the many existing drawings and the technical proficiency of the relatively few surviving paintings confirm that he was a prolific and versatile artist, capable of painting portraits, history pictures and religious scenes. Among his main paintings the two large pictures that depict St. Bruno in the church of San Bartolomeo at Certosa, in the Genoese district of Rivarolo, the paintings in the Oratory of Assunta, nearby the church of Coronata, in the district of Cornigliano, considered his masterpiece and those in the church of Nostra Signora del Carmine in Genoa.

== Biography ==
=== Early life and education ===
Giovanni Raffaele Badaracco was born in Genoa, son and pupil of the painter Giuseppe Badaracco. After studying some time under his father he went to Rome, and entered the school of Carlo Maratta. He spent eight years in Rome during the 1660s, when Andrea Carlone was also recorded there (1662; 1664; 1666), which could explain the similarity of their drawing styles, for which both were indebted to Maratta.

=== Early career ===
Badaracco visited Naples, Venice and other Italian cities before returning to Genoa, possibly by 1668 when he painted a portrait of Stefano Lomellini (Carpi, Foresti priv. col.) in a style influenced by Anthony van Dyck. The Lomellini also commissioned from Badaracco four overdoor paintings and two large wall canvases, for the Palazzo Lomellini, Genoa. The Battle Scene is crowded with twisting figures that recall Giovanni Benedetto Castiglione’s turbulent pictures, themselves derived from Rubens, while the more classical Esther before Ahasuerus derives from the treatment of the same subject by Giovanni Battista Carlone and Domenico Fiasella.

There followed a Nativity dated 1684 (Pieve di Teco, parish church), which is stylistically close to Badaracco’s altarpiece of the Adoration of the Shepherds (Genoa, Palazzo Bianco) inspired by Castiglione and Domenico Piola. In another altarpiece, the Appearance of the Virgin to the Carmelites (Genoa, Santa Maria del Carmine), Badaracco united a traditional Genoese style with more dramatic, Baroque elements, and his art is close to that of Giovanni Lorenzo Bertolotti and Pietro Paolo Raggi, whose Virgin and Child with St. Simon Stock hangs as a pendant to Badaracco’s painting. There are two further altarpieces in Genoa, the signed Crucifixion with the Virgin, St. John and Mary Magdalene (Sanctuary of the Madonnetta) and the Removal of the Body of St. Stephen (Oratory of Santo Stefano delle Fosse).

=== Mature years ===
Badaracco’s best-known work is a series of large canvases in the oratory of the Assumption, Cornigliano, Genoa, the Assumption and Coronation of the Virgin over the high altar, eight frescoed scenes of the Passion on the walls and the Last Supper on the end wall. The tiny gestures, small facial features, rounded, soft-modelled faces, arms and legs bathed in strong light contrasts are painted in the smooth, polished manner of Maratta, but their compositions represent a compromise between the old narrative tradition and the Baroque spirit of the Piola family.

There are many paintings recorded as done for churches outside Genoa, including a series of the Twelve Apostles (Sestri Ponente, Oratory of Giuseppe) and St. Francis Xavier (Pontedecimo, San Quirico). Badaracco lacked the decorative flamboyance of Piola, yet remained on the periphery of the Piola family, sharing their images and artistic contacts, as is evident in his crowded frontispiece design Charity, transferred to a Savona ceramic plate, engraved by Georges Tasnière (1632–1704), who also reproduced numerous designs by Piola. Badaracco left many drawings, among them sketchy, pen-and-ink compositional studies such as the Appearance of the Virgin to the Carmelites (Paris, Louvre).

== Gallery ==
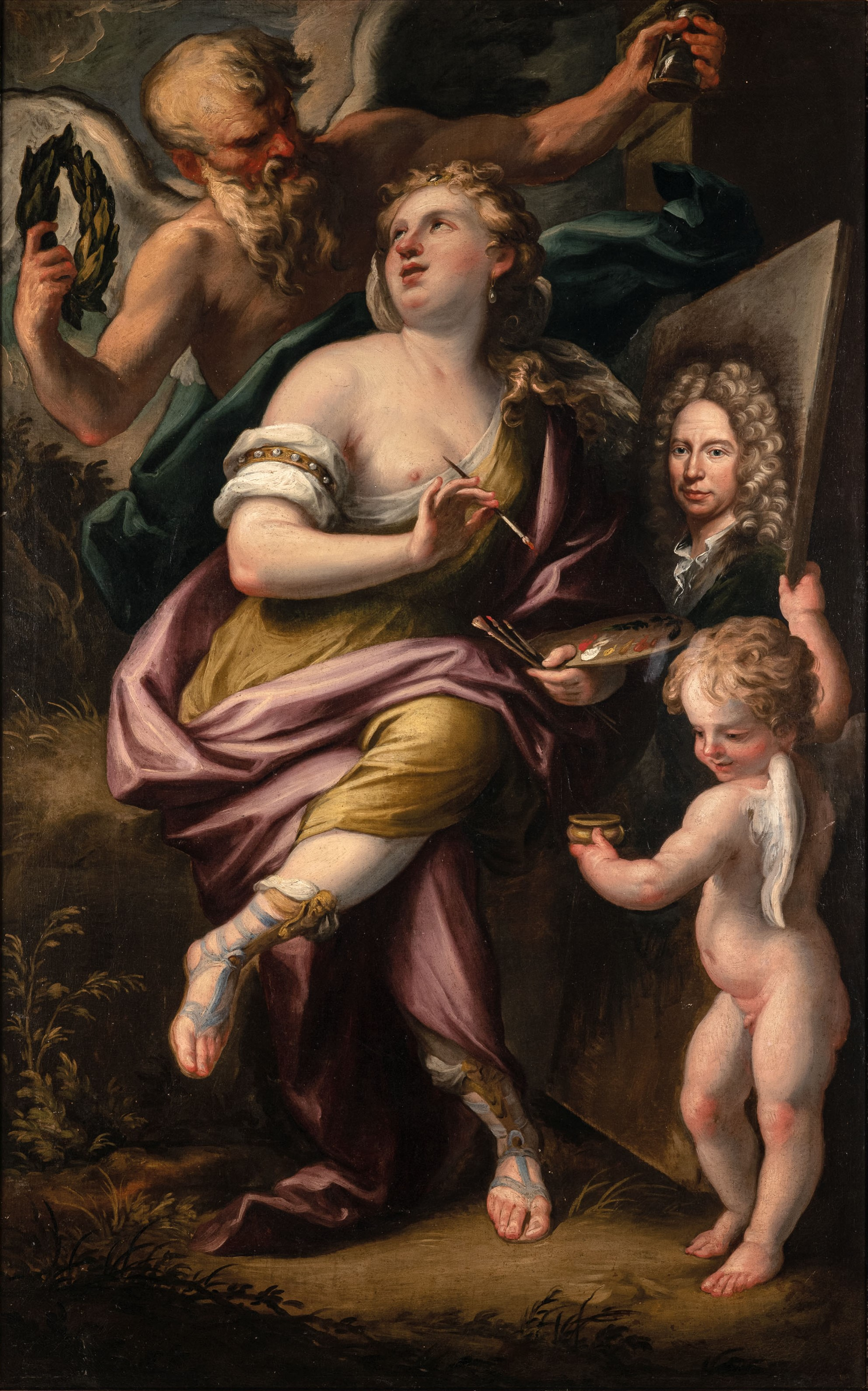
Allegory of Painting with self-portrait of the artist

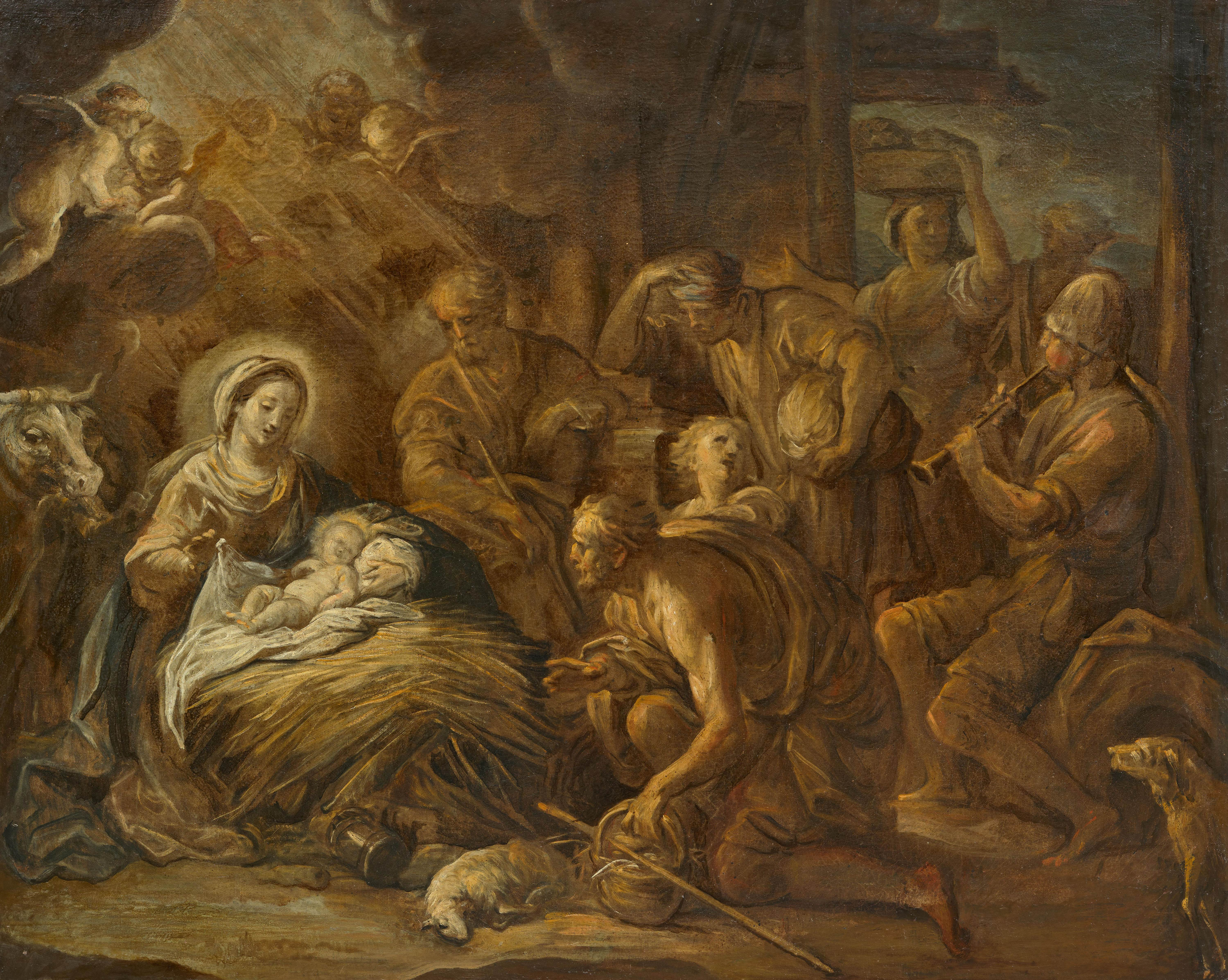
Adoration of the Shepherds

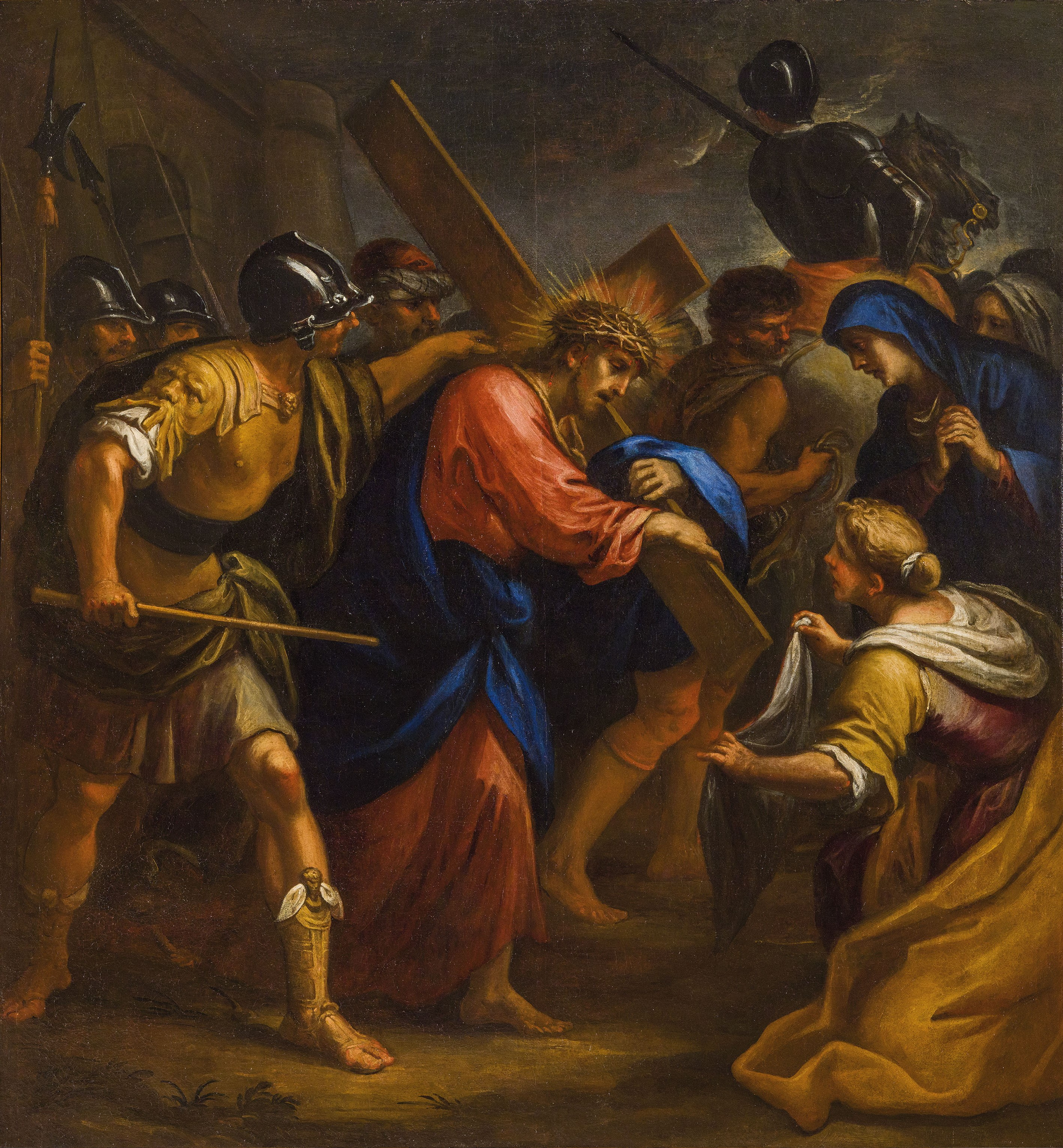
The Ascent to Calvary

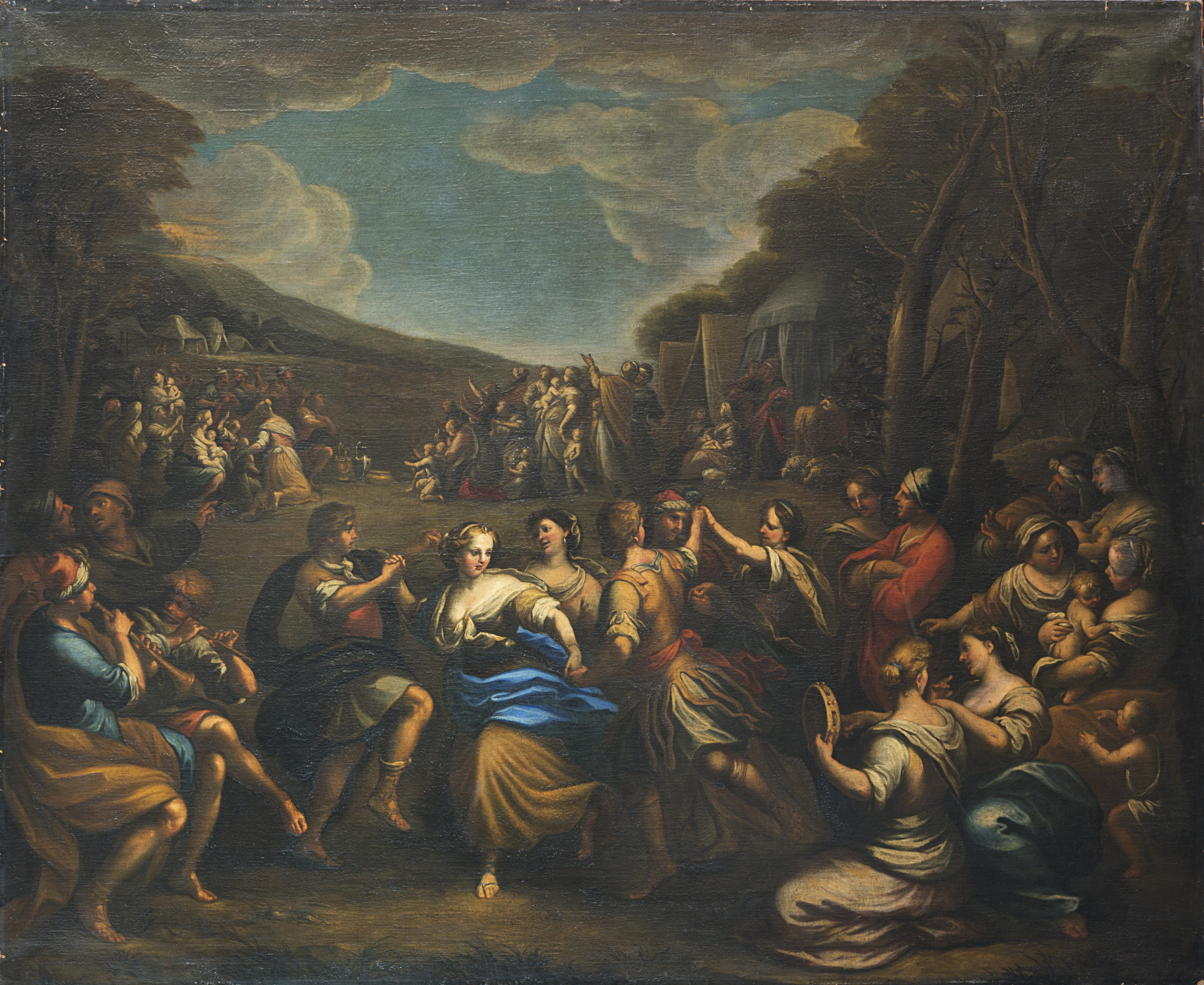
The Adoration of the Golden Calf
