= Giovanni Stefano Verdura =

Italian painter (died 1657)

Giovanni Stefano Verdura was a 17th-century Italian painter of the Baroque period, mainly active in Genoa and later in the Piedmont. He was a disciple of the Genoese painter Domenico Fiasella. He died of the plague in 1657.

== Sources ==
- Soprani, Raffaello (1769). Carlo Giuseppe Ratti (ed.). Delle vite de' pittori, scultori, ed architetti genovesi; Tomo secundo scritto da Carlo Giuseppe Ratti. Genoa: Stamperia Casamara. pp. 237. "Genovesi Raffaello Soprani.".
