= Elvira Badaracco =

Italian politician, socialist, writer and feminist activist

Elvira Badaracco (22 May 1911 — 21 January 1994) was an Italian politician, socialist, writer and feminist activist.

== Biography ==
Elvira Badaracco was born in Alessandria, Italy. As a teenager she moved with her parents to Milan.

=== Political career ===
From 1963 she began to devote herself to political activity; the following year she enrolled in the Italian Socialist Party, dealing with social and women's issues. In those years she also joined the Unione donne italiane. From 1964 to 1970 she was secretary of the Morandi Section, elected councilor for zone 5 of Milan and, as party representative, entered the Administrative Board of the Ronzoni Surgical Institute and then into the Board of Directors of Clinical Specialization Institutes. As provincial and then regional head of the PSI she organized many conferences on the history of socialist women, work, health of women workers and abortion. In 1974 she began writing articles at L'Avanti! and other national newspapers. From 1979 to 1980 she became city councilor in Milan for the PSI.

=== Center for Historical Studies ===
In 1979 she founded the "Center for Historical Studies on the Women's Liberation Movement in Italy" with Pierrette Coppa and served as its president until her death in 1994. The Center was created:

With the aim of collecting, organizing, preserving and making available the wealth of knowledge and practices developed by the women's movement, in the belief that the protection and enhancement of the history of feminism and the history of women in general constitutes a value not only scientific and cultural, but also - and above all - political.

The Center carries out an intense political and cultural activity in Milan and collects documentation on the feminist movement on an ongoing basis. In her will, Elvira Badaracco donated her assets to the Study Center, naming Annarita Buttafuoco as the life guarantor of the economic, scientific and political heritage she left behind, requiring the transformation of the Center into a Foundation. The Elvira Badaracco Foundation was established in December 1994 and Marina Zancan was named president. On the death of Annarita Buttafuoco in 1999, the role of guarantor passed to Marina Zancan.

== Selected publications ==
- Francesco Dambrosio, Elvira Badaracco and Mauro Buscaglia, Maternita cosciente, contraccezione e aborto, 2. ed., Milano, Mazzotta, 1976.
- Donne e socialismo, in Donne e internazionalismo, Milano, Lega internazionale per i diritti e la liberazione dei popoli, 1980.
