= Giuseppe Badaracco =

Italian painter

Giuseppe Badaracco (1588–1657), also called “Il Sordo” (the Deaf), was an Italian painter of the Baroque period, active mainly in Genoa, in Liguria and in the island of Corsica.

Born in Genoa into well-to-do family, he first studied classic literature, but moved into an apprenticeship with the painter Bernardo Strozzi, then Giovanni Andrea Ansaldo. He worked for some years in Florence, where he copied many of the works of Andrea del Sarto. Returning to Genoa (about 1625), he painted mainly for private customers. He worked also in Corsica (at that time part of the Republic of Genoa), where he painted locally influential paintings for some churches around Bastia. He died in 1657 from the plague that swept through Genoa. He fathered four sons; among them Giovanni Raffaele (1648–1717), who was also his pupil, became a notable painter.

== Works ==
- St Peter Martyr praying to the crucifix, Museum of Accademia di Belle Arti Tadini, Lovere.
- Virgin and St Joseph intercede with the Trinity for the souls of Purgatory, in the church of San Pierre at Luri, Corsica. More of his paintings are found in other churches near Bastia
- St Phillip Neri adoring the Crucifix, church of San Nicola e Erasmo, Genova-Voltri
- Saints Erasmus, Clare, and Nicholas, church of Santa Maria Assunta, Camogli
- Virgin grants scapular to Simon Stock, with the saints John the Baptist and Joseph, church of Saints Peter and Paul Ceriana
- Death of St Joseph, church of Sant’Antimo at Piombino, Tuscany.
- St Francesco da Paola attributed by some to Badaracco, Oratory of San Rocco, Tortona
- Paintings for church of St Anthony the Abbott at Diano Marina
- Madonna and Child with saints Peter, Erasmus and Anthony Abbott church of San Matteo at Borghetto Santo Spirito
- Miracle of St Antony of Padua and the mule, Oratory of San Giuseppe, in the same town.

The last two paintings are interesting also from the historical point of view, as they show on the background two different views of Borghetto Santo Spirito in the 17th century.
