= Giovanni Andrea Ansaldo =

Italian painter (1584–1638)

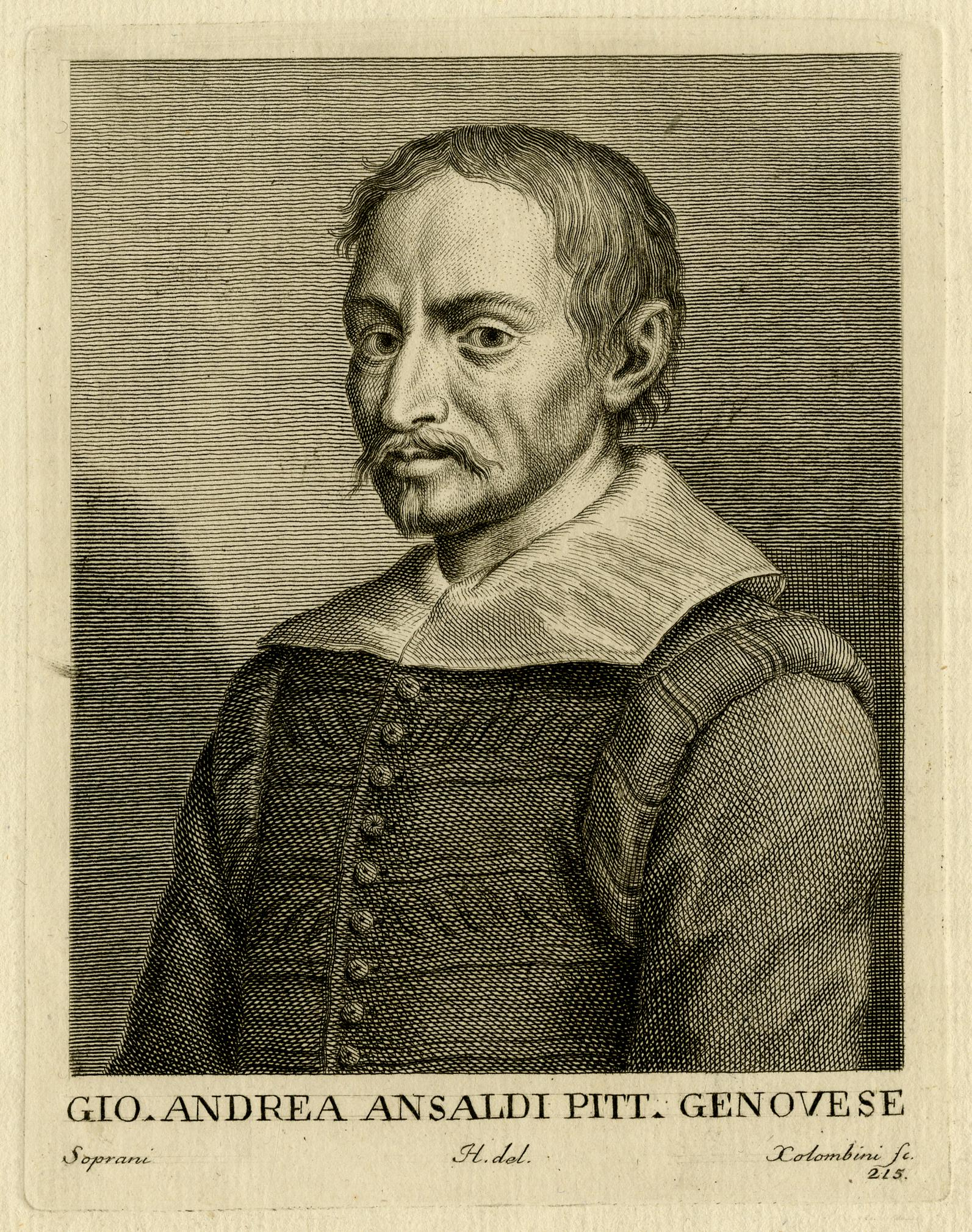
Giovanni Andrea Ansaldo

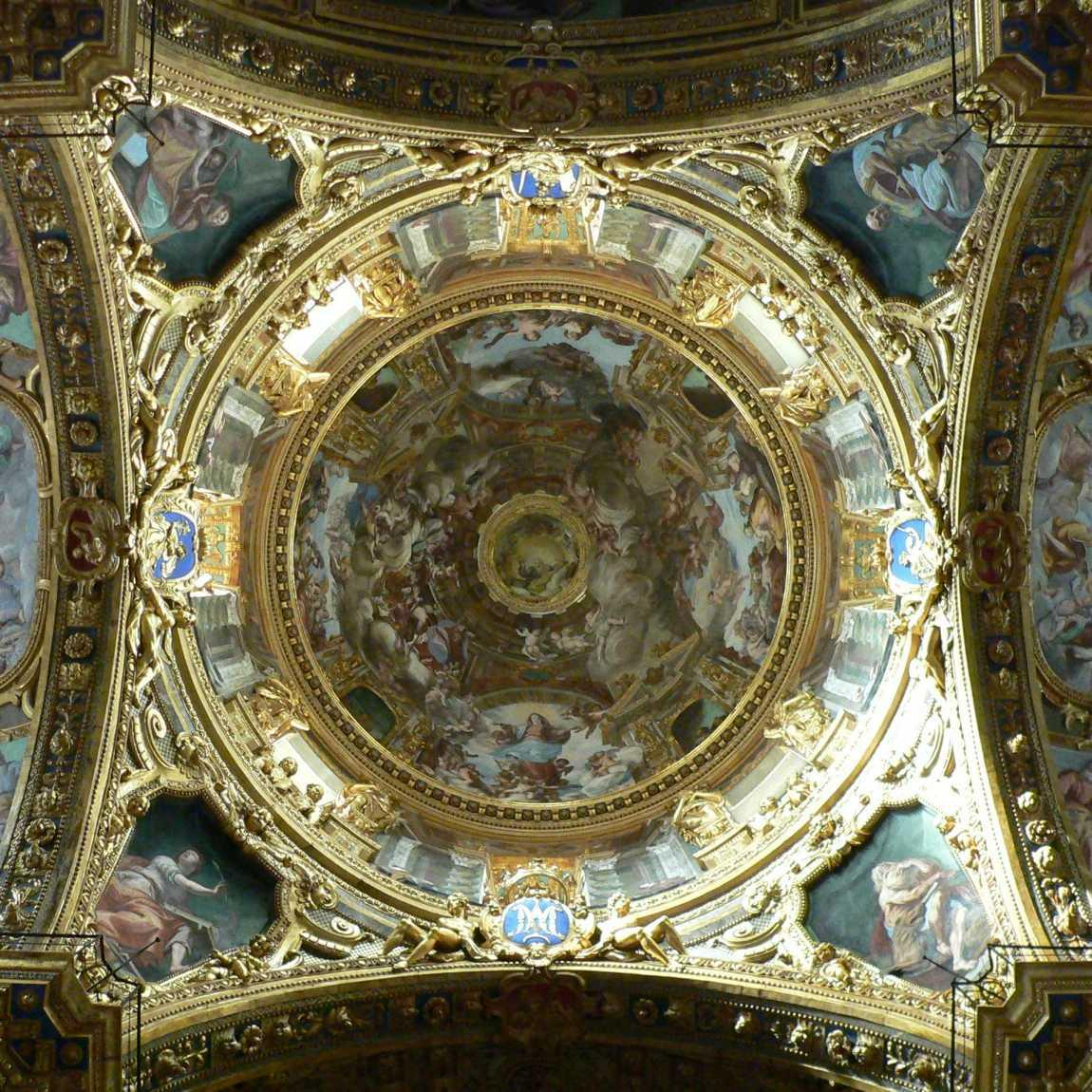
The dome of the Annunziata, Genoa.

Giovanni Andrea Ansaldo (1584 – August 18, 1638) was an Italian painter active mainly in Genoa.

== Life ==
Ansaldo was born in Voltri, now part of the comune of Genoa, the son of a merchant. He trained under Orazio Cambiasi and possibly collaborated with Bernardo Strozzi.

Two of his pupils were Giuseppe Badaracco and Bartolomeo Bassi. One of his descendants was Innocenzo Ansaldo of Pescia (February 12, 1734- February 16, 1816).

He died in Genoa and was probably buried in the same Annunziata church.

== Work ==
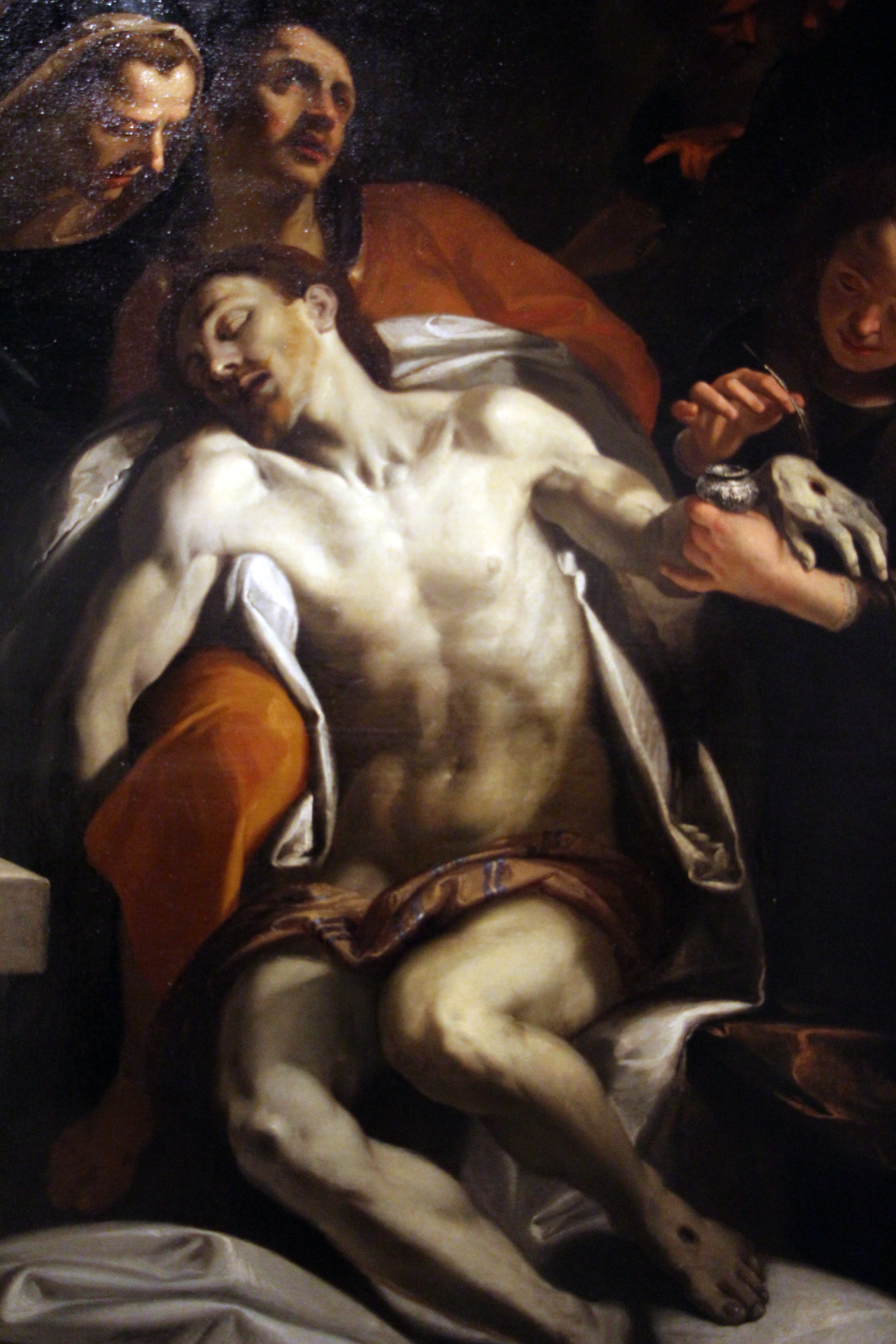
Deposition from the Cross

Only a few of Ansaldo's works are dated or documented, but most of these paintings listed in the early art historian Raffaello Soprani's 1768 publication about artists in Genoa Le vite de' pittori, scultori, ed architetti genovesi still survive. They span a period of over 20 years.

Ansaldo's works are typical of the Genoese eclecticism of the early 17th century, influenced by Flemish artists such as Rubens and Anthony van Dyck and the Milanese Giovanni Battista Crespi, Giulio Cesare Procaccini and il Morazzone.

Ansaldo was responsible for the fresco decoration of the cupola of the Basilica della Santissima Annunziata del Vastato of Genova, completed during 1635–1638, just before his death. His Annunciation fresco is considered the first true Baroque painting in the city. Through a complex trompe-l'œil view, it reproduces the interior of a Greek Cross planned church, with Mary ascending to heaven being awaited by the Holy Father in the centre of the dome.

Altarpieces from Ansaldo were commissioned for the Cathedral of Segovia. A Deposition is presently housed in the Accademia Linguistica of Genoa.
