= 1619 in art =

Events from the year 1619 in art.

== Events ==
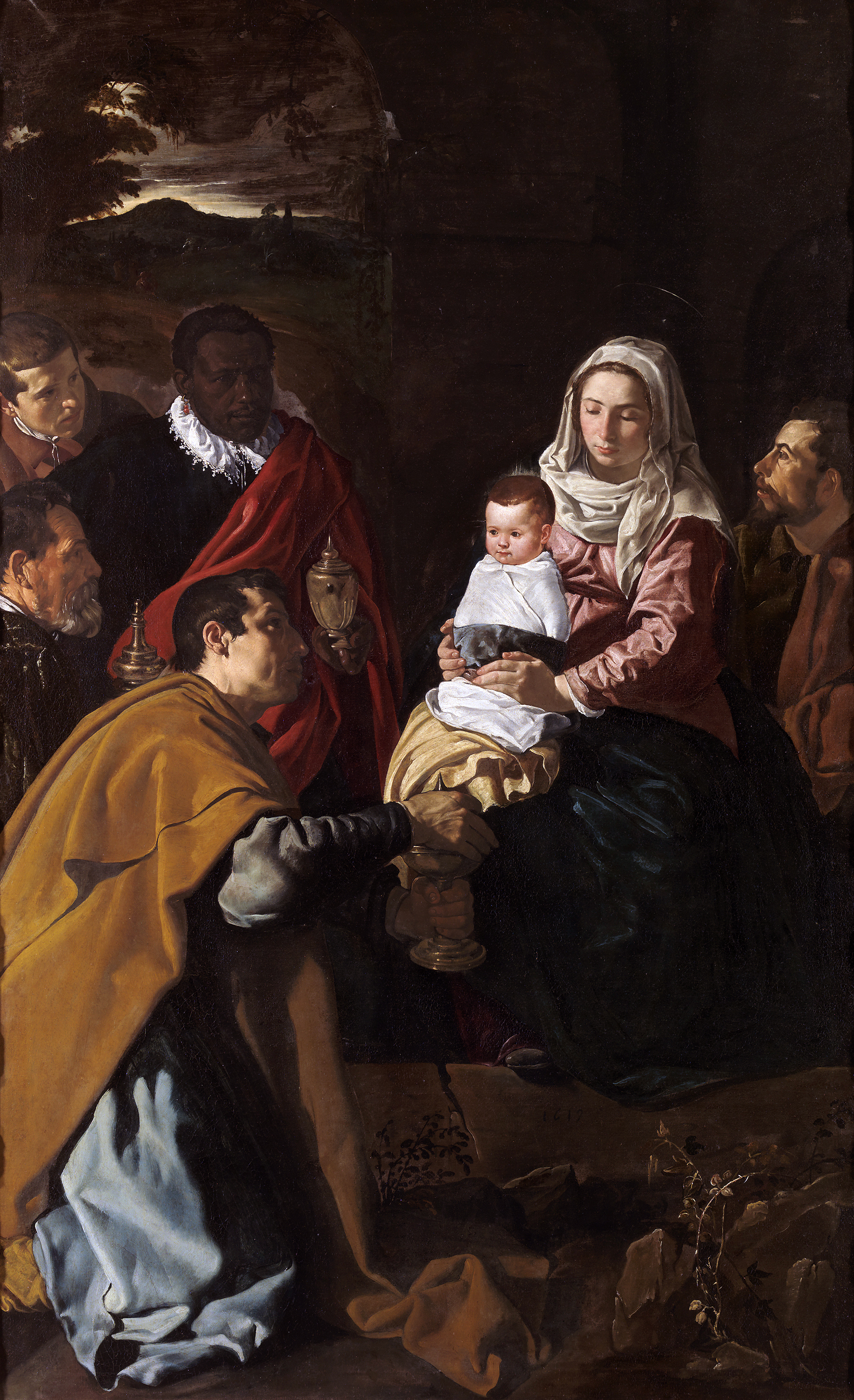
Adoration of the Magi (Velázquez)

== Paintings ==
- Girolamo da Ponte - Gianfrancesco Sagredo (Ashmolean Museum, Oxford)
- Guercino -
  - Return of the Prodigal Son
  - The Raising of Lazarus
- Diego Velázquez - Adoration of the Magi

== Births ==
- February 24 - Charles Le Brun, painter (died 1690)
- April 2 - Onofrio Gabrieli, Italian painter (died 1706)
- May - Philips Wouwerman, Dutch painter (died 1668)
- June - Jan Victors, Dutch painter of subjects from the Bible (died 1679)
- August 15 - Hubertus Quellinus, Flemish Baroque engraver (died 1687)
- November - Willem Kalf, Dutch painter (died 1693)
- November 5 - Philips Koninck, Dutch landscape painter (died 1688)
- date unknown
  - Francesco Boschi, Italian painter, active mainly in Florence (died 1675)
  - Hieronymus Joachims – Austrian painter (died 1660)
  - Francesco Merano, Italian painter mainly active in his native Genoa (died 1657)
  - Pietro Montanini, Italian painter (died 1689)
  - Giuseppe Nuvolone, Italian painter active mainly in Milan, Brescia, and Cremona (died 1703)
  - Pietro Paolo Naldini, Italian sculptor (died 1691)
- probable - Otto Marseus van Schrieck, painter of the Dutch Golden Age (died 1678)

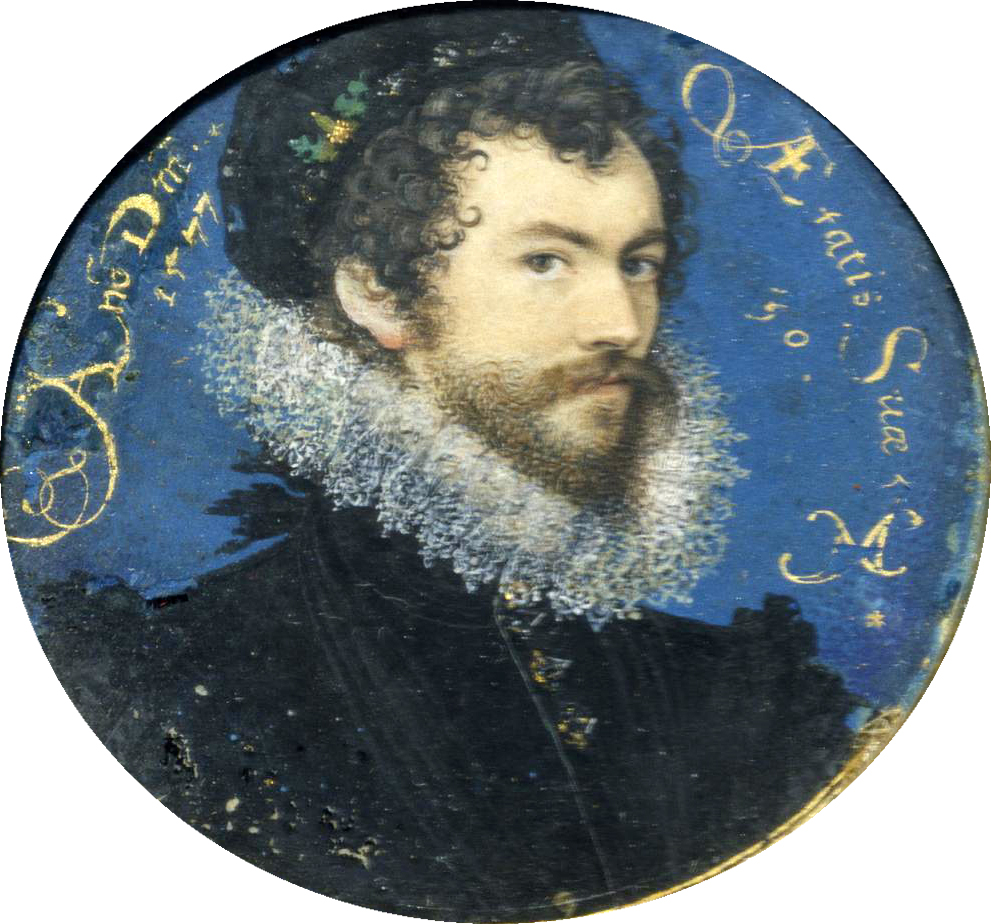
Nicholas Hilliard self-portrait (1577)

== Deaths ==
- January 7 – (burial) Nicholas Hilliard, English miniaturist (born 1547)
- March 28 - Daniel Soreau, German still life painter (born 1560)
- April 16 - Denis Calvaert, Flemish painter (born 1540)
- April/May - William Larkin, English painter (born early 1580s)
- June 18 - Martin Fréminet, French painter and engraver (born 1567)
- November 13 – Lodovico Carracci, Italian painter (born 1555)
- date unknown
  - François Quesnel, French painter of Scottish extraction (born 1543)
  - Lorenz van Steenwinckel, Flemish-Danish architect and sculptor (born 1585)
  - Hieronymus Wierix, Flemish engraver (born 1553)
