= Church of Saint Louis of France =

Church in Seville, Spain

- Iglesia de San Luis de los Franceses
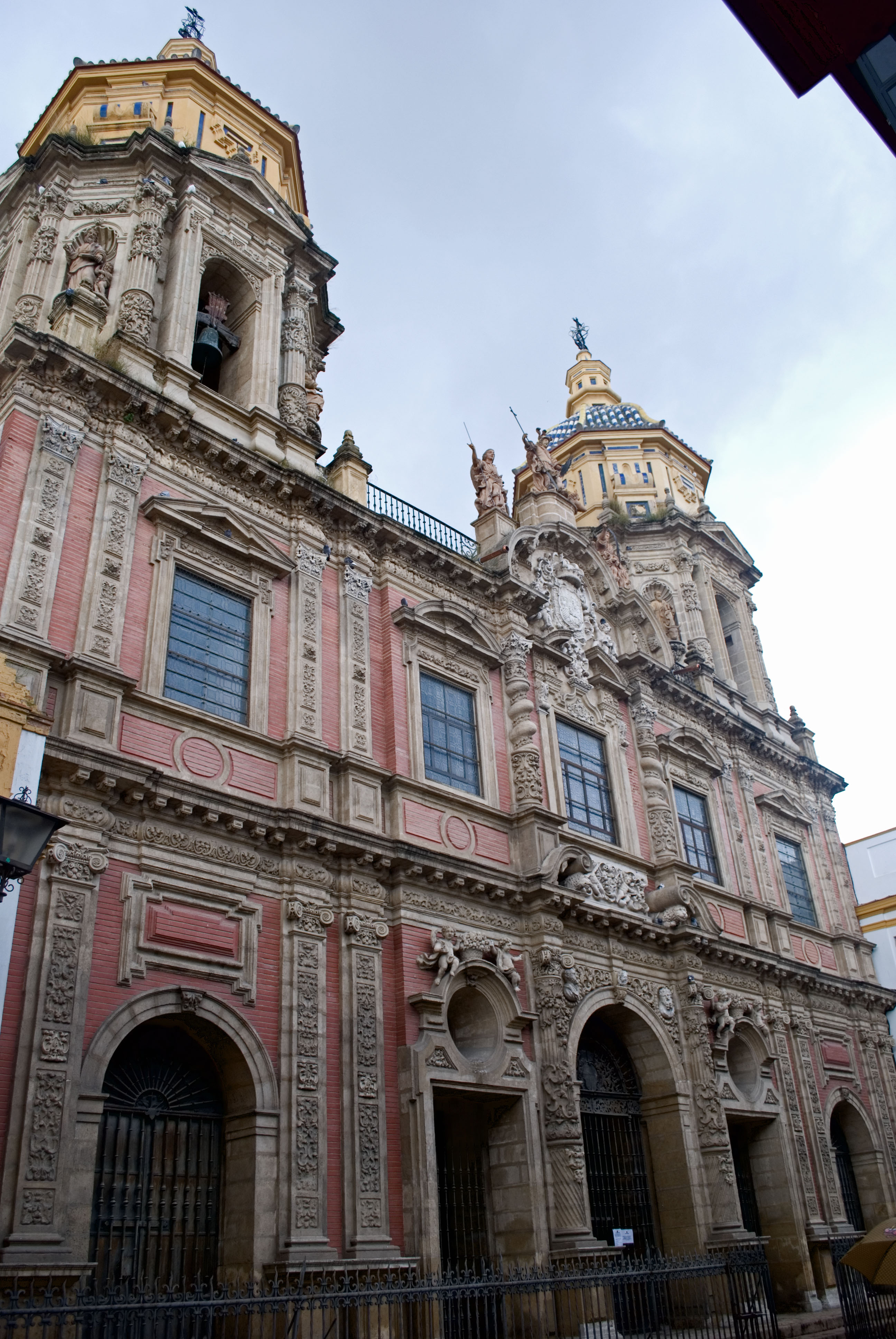

Religion
- Affiliation: Roman Catholic Church, Society of Jesus
- Province: Sevilla
- Region: Andalusia

Location
- Municipality: Sevilla
- Country: Spain
- Interactive map of Church of Saint Louis of France
- Coordinates: 37°23′54″N 5°59′18″W

Architecture
- Architect: Leonardo de Figueroa
- Style: Baroque
- Groundbreaking: 1699
- Completed: 1731
- Direction of façade: East

The Church of Saint Louis of France (Spanish: Iglesia de San Luis de los Franceses), located in the historic district of Seville, Spain, represents an example of Baroque architecture in the 18th century. The church was designed by the architect Leonardo of Figueroa and constructed between 1699 and 1731 on behalf of the Jesuits. Following the expulsion of the Jesuits from Spain in 1835, it had different uses and was eventually deconsecrated. The building currently belongs to the Provincial Council of Seville.

== History ==
The Society of Jesus arrived in Seville in 1554 and constructed a church, a professed house and a novitiate. Of these, only the Church of the Annunciation has been preserved.

At the beginning of the seventeenth century, Lucia de Medina donated land for a new, larger building and a new church with the conditions that she would be buried in the chapel and that the church be dedicated to her patron saint, Saint Louis (Louis IX of France, medieval king and first brother of King Ferdinand III of Castile and León, who reconquered Seville.)

Another factor that influenced the dedication to Saint Louis was that the Jesuits wanted to build a relationship with the Spanish monarchy, especially with the new French dynasty that started with Phillip V, and thus avoid being expelled. Representations within the church of the crown (an attribute of kings) and the fleur de lis (a symbol of the House of Bourbon, also represented on the Spanish coat of arms), emphasize the link between the monarchs and the Catholic church.

By 1609, the novitiate had already been moved. Construction of the church began in 1699 and ended in 1730. In 1731, archbishop Luis de Salcedo y Azcona inaugurated the building as Church Saint Louis of France.

The Jesuits abandoned the church in 1767 as a result of the Royal Order of Carlos III that expelled the Jesuits from Spain. Although they returned in 1817, the expulsion of 1835 forced them to abandon the complex altogether.

Since that time, the novitiate has had various uses: seminary, Franciscan convent, hospital for venerated priests, a factory, and a hospice. The church remained closed and not used for worship for many years.

Unlike many other churches in Seville, Saint Louis was saved from destruction by the fires of 1936. Because of this, and its period of disuse, many parts of the original design have been preserved.

Currently, the church belongs to the Provincial Council of Seville. This institution has provided for the restoration of the monument since 1984. It has worked with the Seville Endesa Foundation to provide the artistic lighting of the church, domestic chapel and crypt. On September 6, 2016, the most recent renovations were inaugurated, opening the buildings and art works for public viewing.

== Architecture ==
=== Orientation ===
The church is oriented along the analemma, or route of the Sun in the sky, in a manner such that the altar to the west receives an abundance of light, especially in spring. The main door faces the east, towards the rising sun. The altar of Saint Stanislaus Kostka, to the north, and the altar of Saint Francis Borgia, to the south, receive light the celebratory day of each saint.

=== Exterior ===
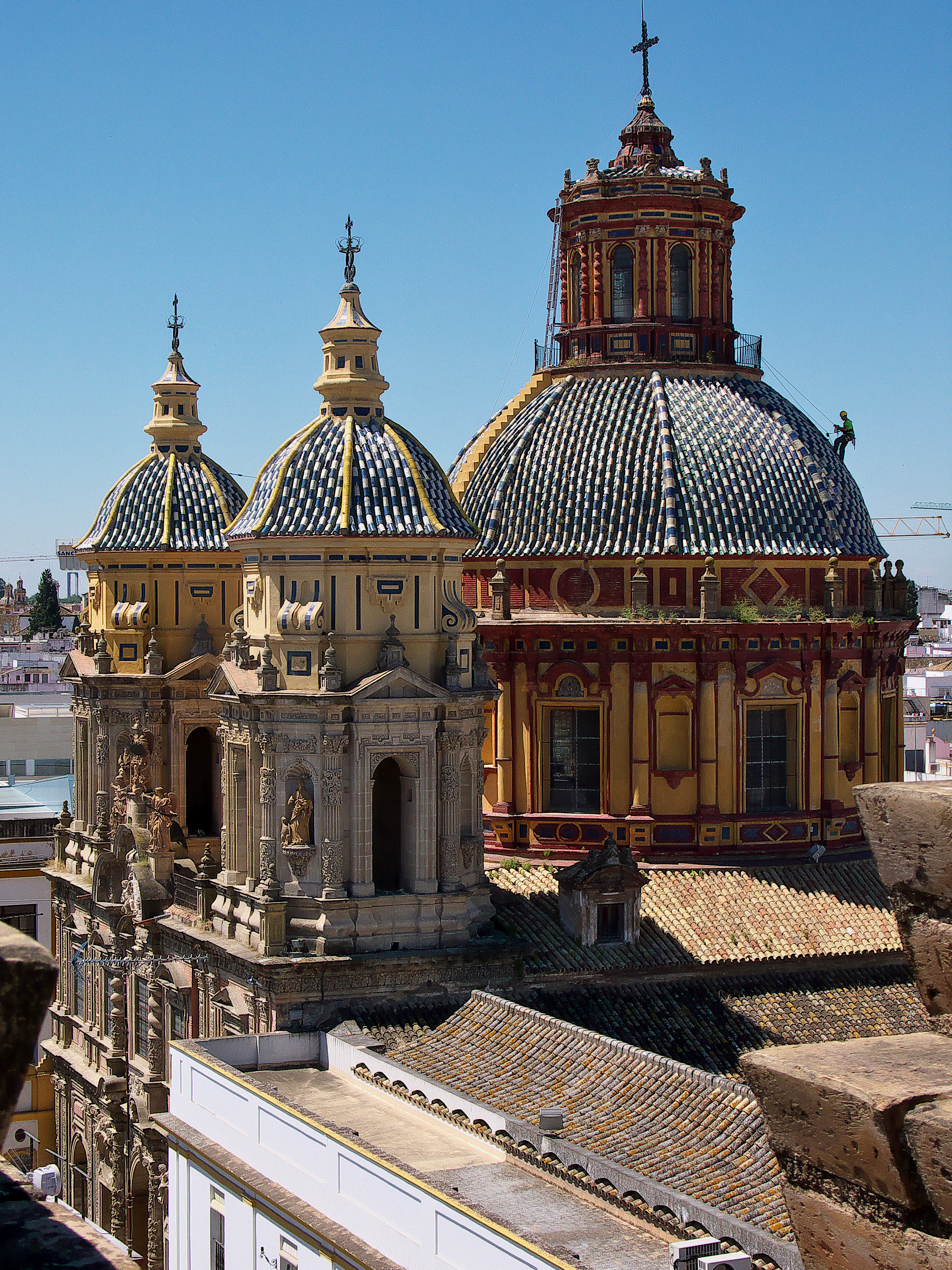
Two Towers and Cupola

The facade consists of two levels, each decorated as a reredo. The levels alternate between stone and brick construction. The façade is flanked by two octagonal towers. The second level includes five windows, with the center window framed by Solomonic columns. Above the central window, the Spanish coat of arms is crowned with three archangels. The façade does not accurately represent the shape nor size of the church. The Jesuits had planned to include a plaza in front of the church so that the full dome and façade could be seen, but the plaza was never constructed.

=== Interior ===
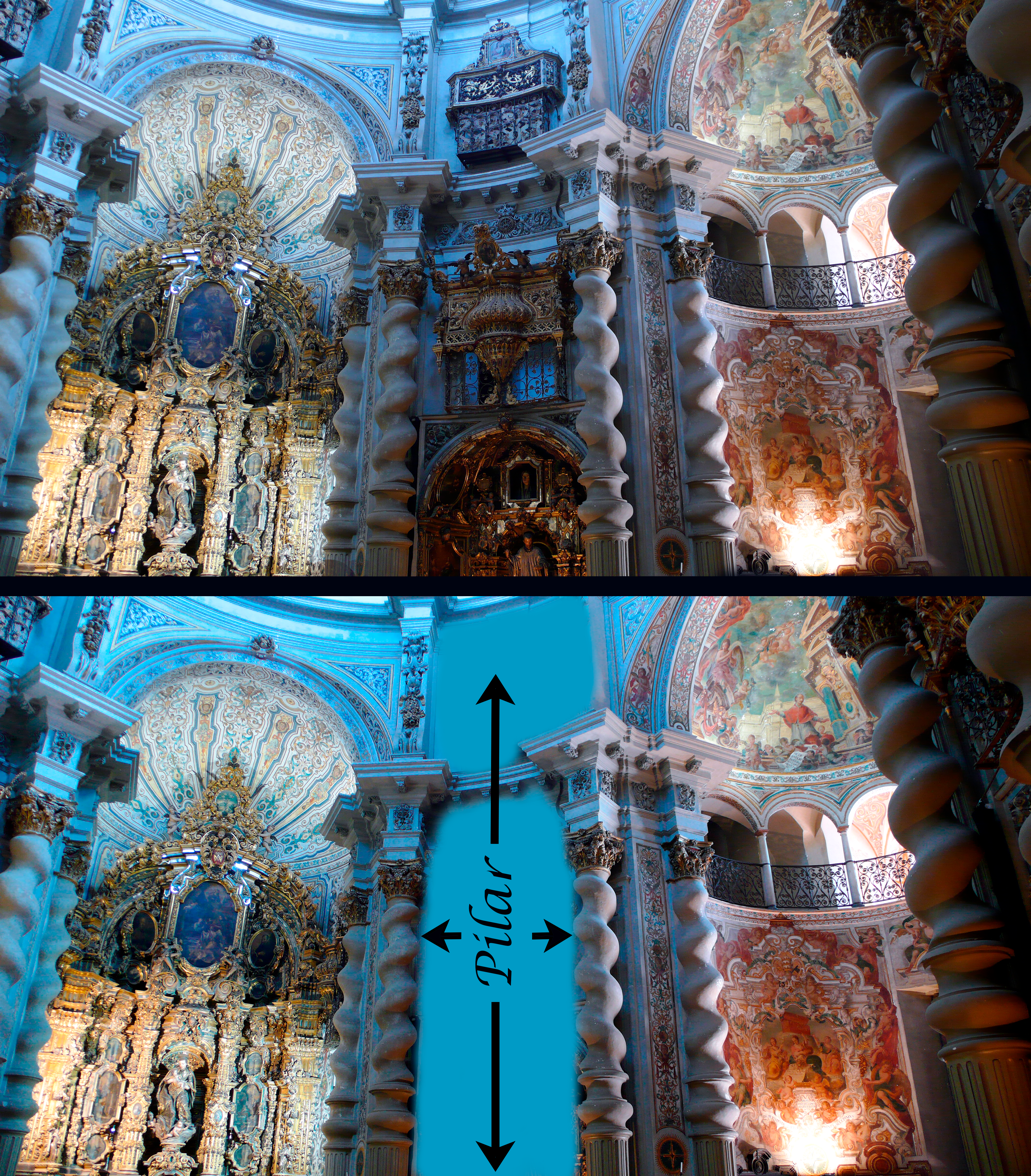
Disguised Pillar

The floor plan forms a Greek cross, capped by a cupola. Sixteen Solomonic columns (eight full columns and eight half columns) appear to support the weight of the cupola. The cupola is actually supported by four recessed stone pillars that form the interior chapels. Four smaller altarpieces form part of the disguise for the pillars, which also includes four balconies and four latticeworks. Of the sixteen Solomonic columns, only the two half columns of the main altar are original. The remaining belong to the 2016 restoration. The stone pillars are covered with stucco but remain unpainted.

The second level includes a platform with eight semi-circular arches and a set of balconies with lattices on the supporting pillars.

Below the choir, the paintings above the main door of the church are dedicated to Saint Ignatius of Loyola. These are works of Domingo Martinez, painted circa 1743. In the scene, Saint Ignatius appears above the temple of divine wisdom, represented as a triumphal arch that holds the book of Spiritual Exercises.

The sides of the entrance employ two allegorical murals defending the Jesuits against detractors. The murals use two papal bulls (regimini militantis Ecclesiae and ad sacram) that authorized and validated the Jesuits and the Spiritual Exercises. In the painting on the right can be seen a mythological theme. "The figures of the three graces are dressed, bearing horns of abundance and are identified by their names: Aglaea (joy), Thalia (obedience and comedy), and Euphrosyne (delight). They preserve Seneca's interpretation, as a triple image of liberality: giving, accepting and returning benefits or gifts."

Saint Louis is a novitiate, a place that serves to educate and thus is replete with symbols with multiple meanings. Above the door can be read, “This is the door of God, the righteous enter through it.” The church serves as a probationary house, where guests and delegations live closed off to communications with the outside world.

Theatrical repetition is a technique used by the architect. In some instances, it can be repetition by through symmetry, such as two equal parts divided by an axis. In other instances, is reiteration of a single element, as with the four representations of Saint Ignatius. The eight-pointed star is found in many places. The fleur de lis, the spiral, the Solomonic columns, and the saints are all repeated throughout the church and chapel.

The altarpieces are full of convex Venetian mirrors, made of tin and mercury. The mirrors serve to reflect light, sending it to other points. This multiplies the effect of the light, as well as deforms and enlarges reality. Further, the mirrors call upon the motto “speculum sine macula”, attributed to the Virgin Mary. Within Saint Louis exist constant reminders of the perishable world, as seen in the eight skulls.

=== Cupola ===
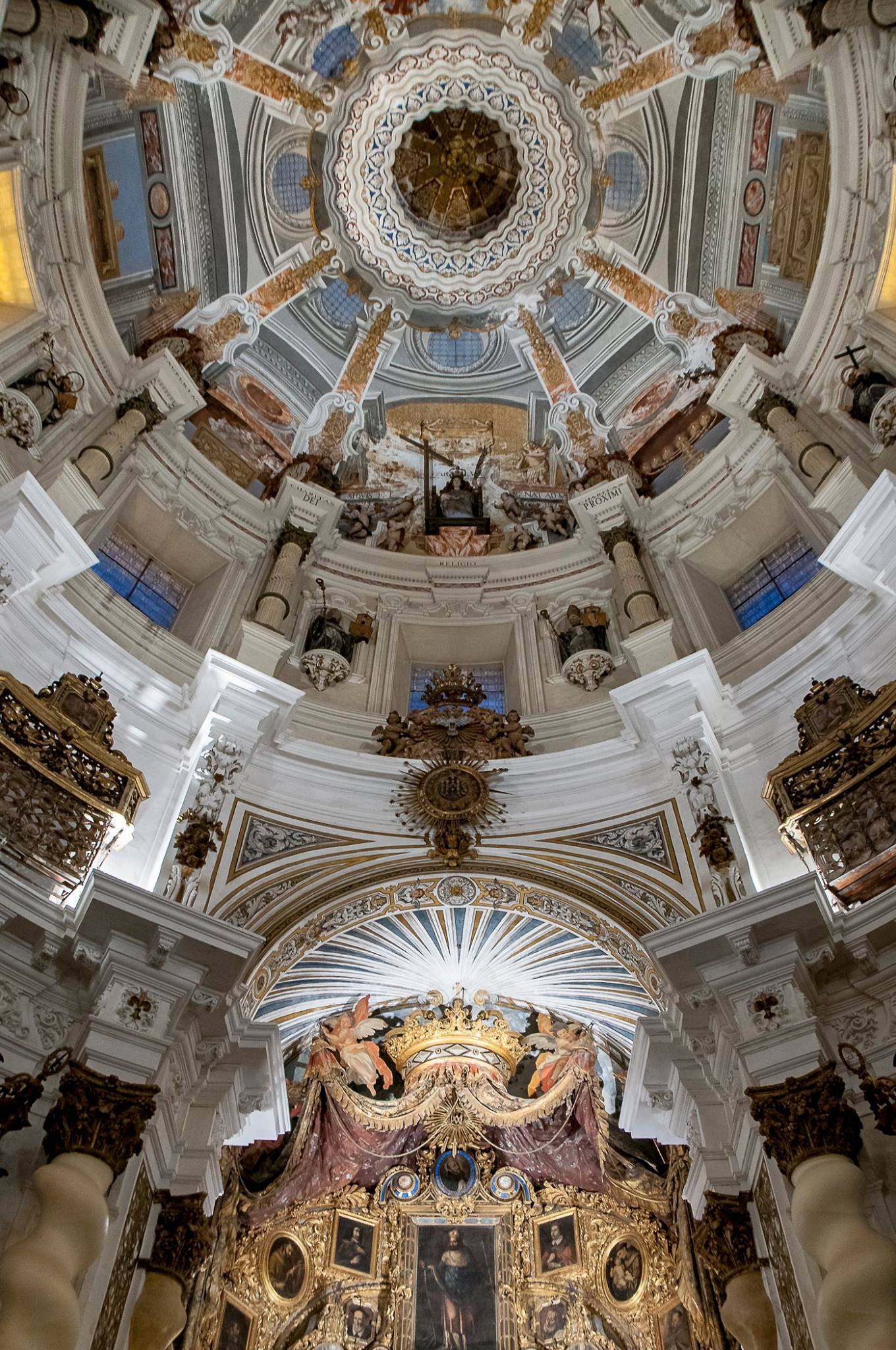
Dome interior, with Religio at upper center

Entering the temple from the main doors, visitors can look directly up into the dome with its large windows, offering an abundance of light. On the dome interior opposite the entrance a representation of Religio can be seen. The figure is flanked by a cross on the right and a palm leaf on the left - both symbols relating to the Christ figure.

The frescos around Religio, painted by Lucas de Valdés, include symbols from both the old and new testaments, including a menorah, the Altar of Incense, the Ark of the Covenant and the Eucharist.

The pillars supporting the dome represent eight virtues, as related to the Beatitudes. Starting from the figure of Religio and moving clockwise, they are:

- CHARITAS PROXIMI - Love of Neighbor; Blessed are the merciful.
- CASTITAS - Chastity; Blessed are the pure of heart.
- ORATIO - Prayer; Blessed are those who hunger and thirst for righteousness.
- HUMILITAS - Humility; Blessed are those who suffer persecution.
- MORTIFICATO - Mortification; Blessed are those who mourn.
- OBIENTIA - Obedience; Blessed are the meek.
- PAUPERTAS - Poverty; Blessed are the poor in spirit.
- CHARITAS DEI - Love of God; Blessed are the peacemakers.

== See also ==
- List of Jesuit sites
