= Adoration of the Magi (Velázquez) =

1619 Baroque painting by Diego Velázquez

The Adoration of the Magi
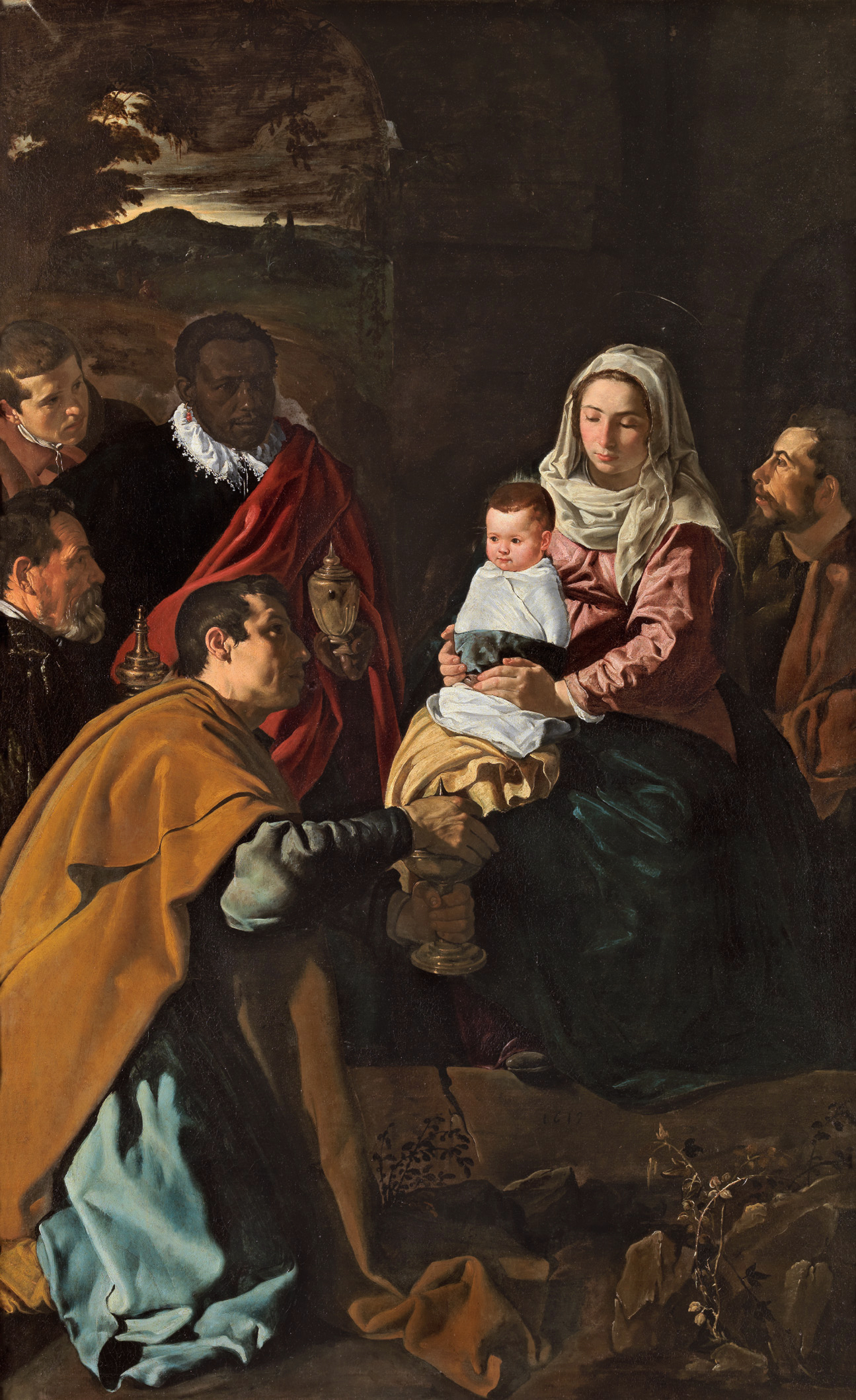
- Artist: Diego Velázquez
- Year: 1619
- Medium: Oil on canvas
- Dimensions: 204 cm × 126.5 cm (80 in × 49.8 in)
- Location: Museo del Prado, Madrid

The Adoration of the Magi is a 1619 Baroque painting by the Spanish artist Diego Velázquez now held in the Museo del Prado in Madrid. It depicts the biblical scene of the three kings presenting gifts to the Christ Child.

Completed when Velázquez was just twenty years old, the painting is the largest of Velázquez's early works and reflects his early skill in religious composition and naturalistic portraiture.

== History ==
The Adoration of the Magi was painted in 1619. It is an ambitious composition due to its size and the large number of figures.

Scholars believe it was likely commissioned by the Jesuit Novitiate of San Luis in Seville, its earliest known record. The commission was likely influenced by his mentor and father-in-law, Francisco Pacheco.

When the Jesuits were expelled from Spain by King Charles III, their possessions, including this painting, were dispersed. One account suggests that Francisco de Bruna, a Sevillian collector and a known art patron, acquired the painting around this time. English traveler Richard Twiss reported seeing it in this collection before 1775.

By the late 18th century, The Adoration of the Magi had entered the royal collection of Spain. Following Francisco de Bruna's death in 1804, Luis Meléndez (de Bruna's nephew) gifted the painting to King Ferdinand VII. The work was initially placed in the Monastery of El Escorial and erroneously attributed to Francisco de Zurbarán in Pedro de Madrazo's Prado catalogue. In 1819, it was transferred to the Museo del Prado in Madrid, where it remains today.

== Description ==
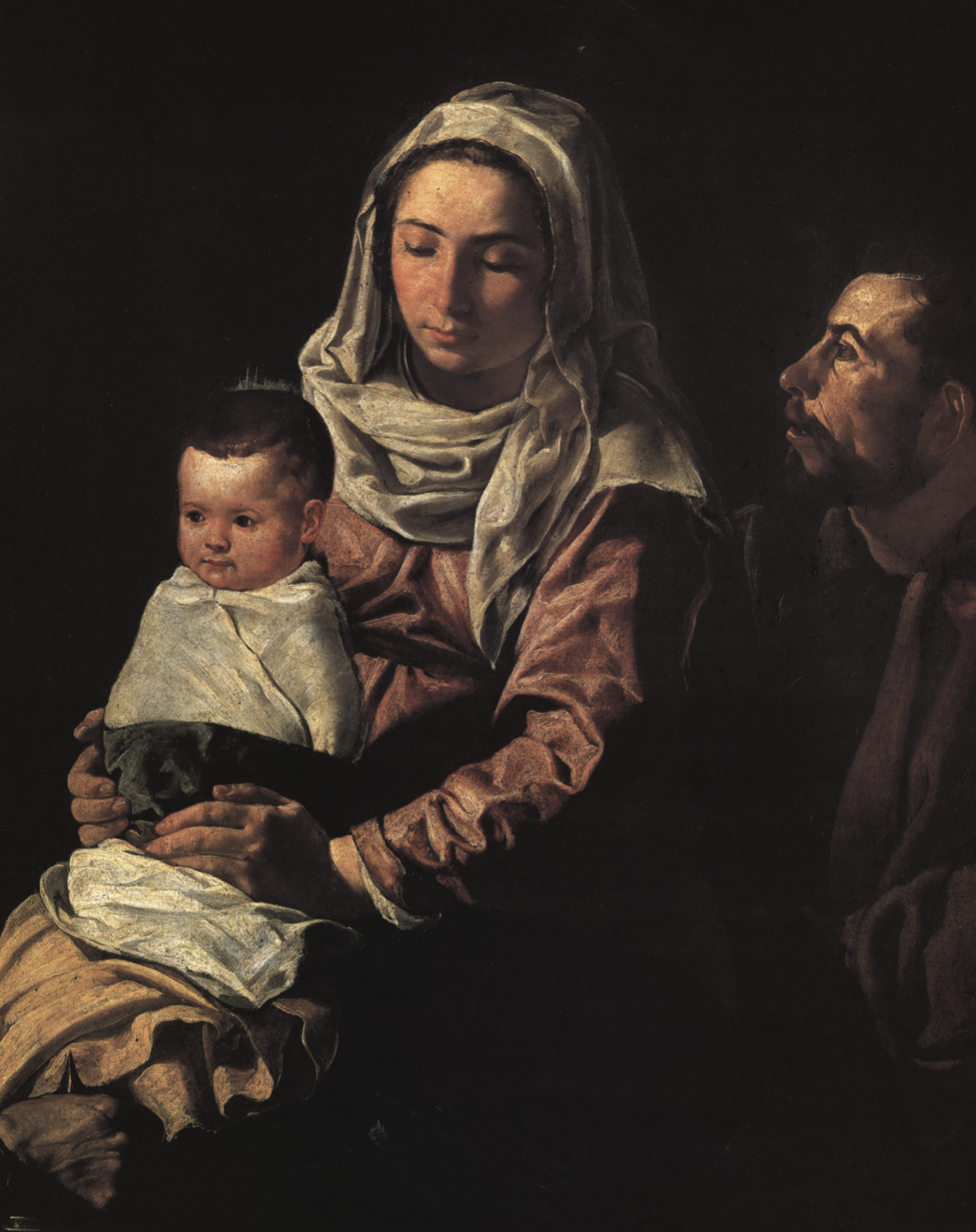
A close-up showing the Christ Child and Virgin Mary

The painting has the characteristics of Velázquez Sevillian phase: the use of chiaroscuro and sharply defined figures. The artist "achieves a painting for meditation" conveying the religious message "in a clear and direct way". The color tonality and the use of chiaroscuro is a clear Caravaggian influence; its dramatic contrast in dark and light underscoring its connection to the Baroque movement. Some scholars describe the painting as "somber and tenebrist".

The figures fill the whole composition and are very close to the picture plane.

At the center of the painting is the Christ Child, his body tightly wrapped in white fabric. The Virgin Mary, wearing a pink dress and a white mantle, is steadily holding her child with a calm expression. On the right stands Saint Joseph.

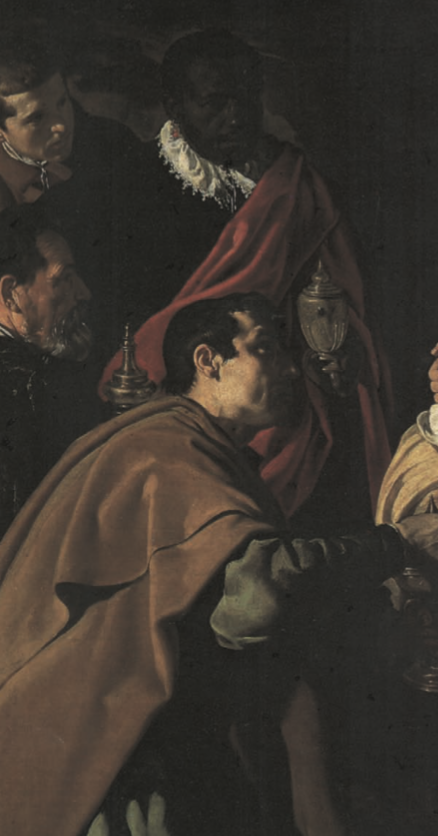
A close-up of the Magi presenting their gifts to the Christ Child

The Three Magi are depicted at the left and stand in close proximity to one another. Closest to the viewer is Melchior, who kneels in the foreground. In the back stands Balthazar, distinguished by his ruff and red mantle. Finally, between these two is Gaspar, nearly hidden from view by Melchior's body. The three characters are presenting their gifts of gold, frankincense, and myrrh. Velázquez depicts them with ordinary clothes.

The figures are placed in a dark background and are illuminated by a strong beam of light originating from the upper left corner, bathing the Virgin and Child in a divine light and creating deep shadows in the colorful clothings. At the top left, Velázquez portrays a foreboding landscape which increases the dramatic tension of the painting.

== Inspiration ==
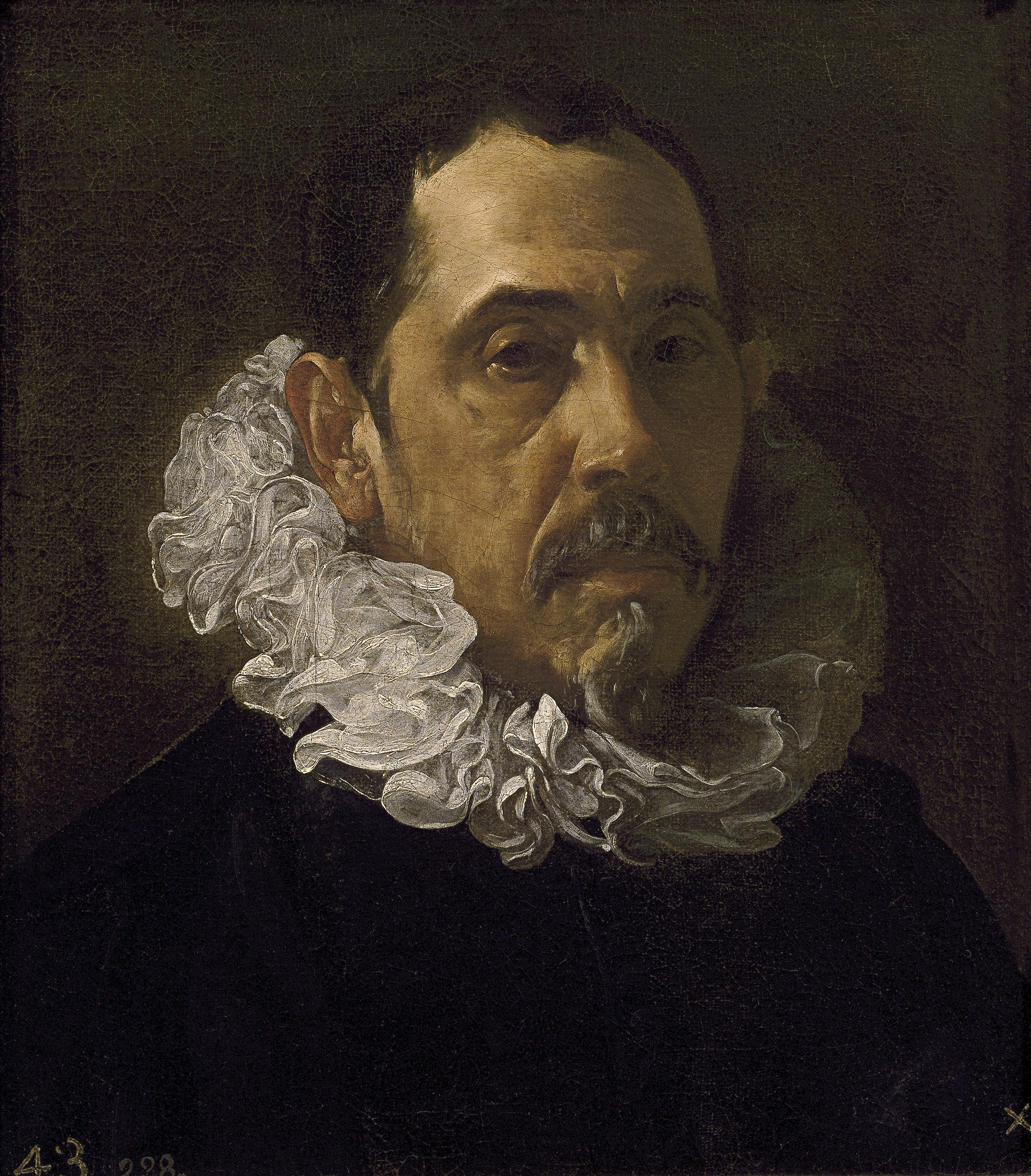
Francisco Pacheco, Velázquez's mentor and father-in-law.

The Adoration of the Magi is one of Velázquez's earlier paintings, and it represents his work in the religious sphere. His mentor and father-in-law, Francisco Pacheco, had close ties to the Society of Jesuits and was influential for Velázquez's religious paintings. Aligning with this, art historians Joan Ainard de Lasarte and José Gudiol believe that the work was initially meant to go to the Jesuit Novitiate of San Luis in Seville.

The historian Julian Gallego ... asserts that Velázquez used his family as live models for this work, demonstrating his inspiration from Caravaggio further. Gallego alleges that Velázquez's wife, Juana, was the model for the Virgin Mary. Moreover, he believes that Velázquez's daughter, Francisca, was the model for the Christ Child, Francisco Pacheco was the model for Melchior, and that Velázquez used himself as a model for Gaspar. Finally, he states that either one of Velázquez's brothers or servants could have modeled for Balthazar. Antonio Domínguez Ortiz believes that while there is no evidence to support this theory, it remains likely that Velázquez used live models for the majority of characters in the painting.

== Original dimensions of the painting ==
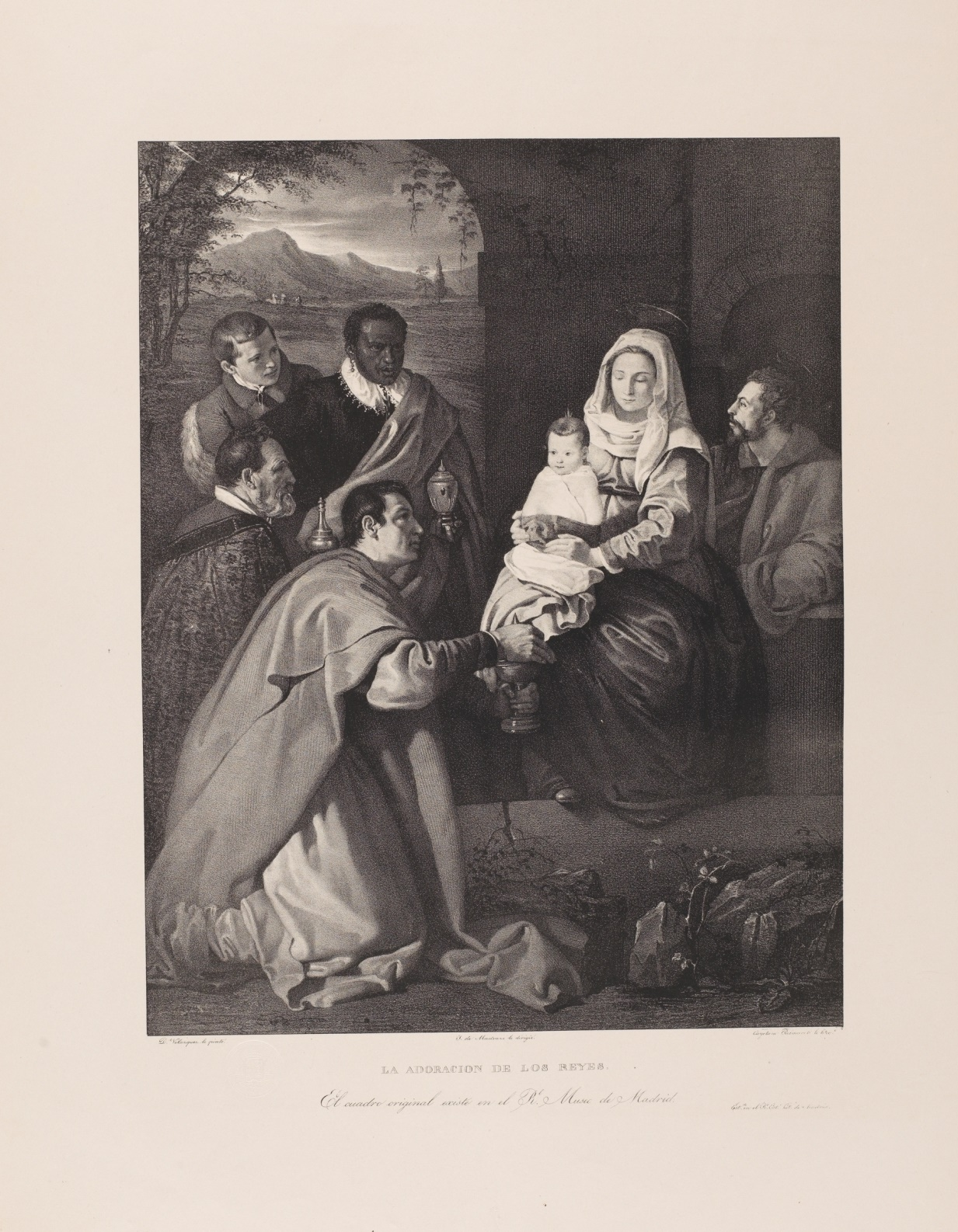
1832 lithograph by Cayetano Palmaroli, showing a wider composition.

The original size of The Adoration of the Magi has been the subject of scholarly debate. The present dimensions of the painting are 79 5/8 by 49 1/4 inches (202 cm × 125 cm). Art historian José López Rey suggested that the canvas may have originally been larger, citing a lithograph made in 1832 by Cayetano Palmaroli and published by Elizabeth du Gué Trapier in 1948. This lithograph depicts a wider version of the painting, where the characters on the left and right of the work are not cropped but fully visible. However, López Rey has questioned the reliability of treating this lithograph as evidence. He proposed that Palmaroli may have reconstructed the missing parts based on his interpretation of Velázquez's sense of composition. López Rey noted the possibility that the present dimension may be original. While some of Velázquez's works were trimmed (e.g., Prince Baltasar Carlos as a Hunter) or augmented (e.g., The Weavers), the artist's general attraction to compactness may support that the current dimension reflected the artist's original intent. Additionally, the work is not a palace composition, but an altar painting, which was less likely to be altered or trimmed.

== See also ==
- List of works by Diego Velázquez
