= Italian Neoclassical interior design =

Italian Neoclassical interior design refers to furnishing and interior decorating trends in Italy which occurred during the Neoclassical period (c. mid-18th century - early 19th century)

== History, background and influences ==
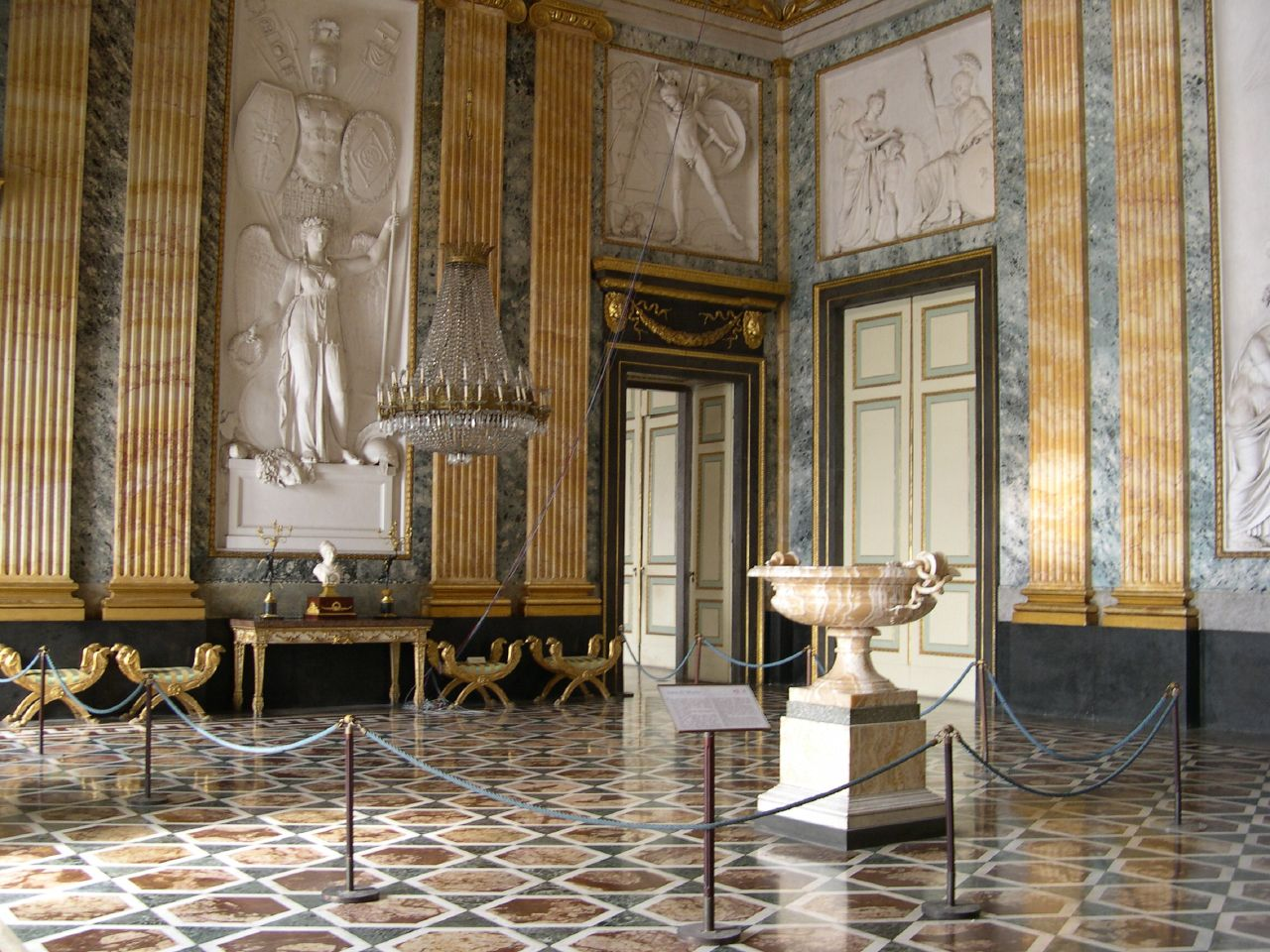
One of the Neoclassical rooms of the Palace of Caserta.

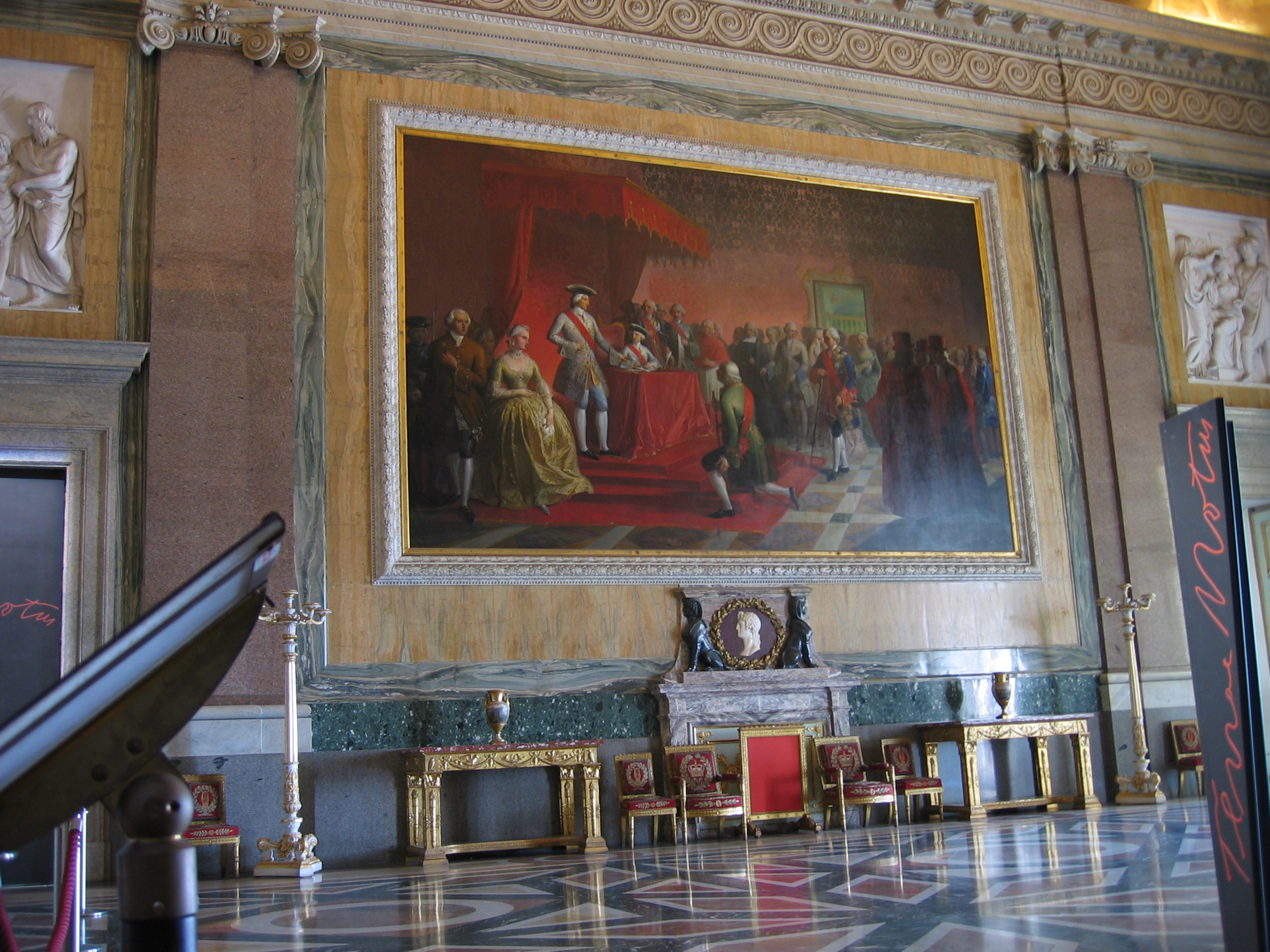
Another Neoclassical room in the Palace of Caserta.

In the visual arts the European movement called "neoclassicism" began after 1765, as a reaction against both the surviving Baroque and Rococo styles, and as a desire to return to the perceived "purity" of the arts of Rome, the more vague perception ("ideal") of Ancient Greek arts, and, to a lesser extent, 16th century Renaissance Classicism.

Indoors, neoclassicism made a discovery of the genuine classic interior, inspired by the rediscoveries at Pompeii and Herculaneum, which had started in the late 1740s, but only achieved a wide audience in the 1760s, with the first luxurious volumes of tightly controlled distribution of Le Antichità di Ercolano.

Italy's major centres of Neoclassical art and interior design were Rome, Milan, Naples, Turin and Genoa, whilst Venice was far slower in adopting this new classicist fashion, and Venetian interiors were still Rococo in essence until the 1790s, when they were lightly made more simple and less flamboyant.

Although Neoclassical designs were mainly based on Roman and Renaissance architecture from Italy, and the nation was one of the founders of the style, France and England were the main stylistic leaders of the period, and by that time, Great Britain had deposed France of its position as the cultural and social leader in Europe. Giovanni Battista Piranesi's book, Diverse Maniere d'Addornare in Cammini illustrated how he believed Neoclassical interior design to be, and were unique in Europe since they combined the classical style of Neoclassical furnishings with the flamboyancy of the Rococo, creating an elaborate, yet Classical style. His works and ideas proved highly popular in Rome, where they were used as prototypes to furnish the interiors of the Vatican, and later spread throughout the rest of the continent.

Italian Neoclassical furniture was loosely based on that of Louis XVI styles but was made unique by the usage of exaggeratedly shaped backs and necks which were recessed. Armoires, or armadi made by the Venetians were more geometrically shaped than the Rococo ones, but were usually gilded in gold and silver, and had a few intricate details, such as cartouches. The French encoignure cabinets also proved highly popular in Italian furniture. French style secretaire writing tables were also popular in Italian furnishings, but were made uniquely Italian by adding pietra dura intricate designs on the marble slabs which covered the writing desks. Italian commodes and console tables were still relatively similar to before, yet they were more classical in style, and rather than having cabriole legs usually had elegantly decorated straight, demi-lune at most, legs.

Armachairs made in Italy were based on the French Louis XVI-esque fauteuils, but were made unique by adding gilded gold and many precious and exotic decorations, such as stones and jewels etc. Since there was a severe shortage of high-quality woods such as walnut, most furnishings were gilded in order to cover some of the low-quality materials used.

== Difference by city and region ==
=== Turin and Piedmont ===
Turin was the most French of Italian cities since it was its closest neighbour and still produced some of the grandest Royal Palaces in the nation, themed on buildings such as those of Versailles. In the 1770s, Piedmont and Turin-based Neoclassical furniture was essentially French in style, and its greatest son in that field was Giuseppe Maria Bonzanigo who made what was believed to be the best Italian Neoclassical furniture, with his elegant designs and luxurious materials.

=== Milan and Lombardy ===
Milanese and Lombard designs were still very well known for being simple and sober, usually including furniture which was made out of walnut and which was not gilded. The city and the region were very famous for their cabinet-making and the probably the greatest ebenista (carpenter) from there was Giuseppe Maggioloni.

=== Rome and Lazio ===
Ancient Rome's architecture inspired the Neoclassical movement, thus the city was a major epicentre for interior design made according to that style. Giuseppe Valadier was famous for making Roman Neoclassicism unique, including his bold and grandly sculpted tables. He was also famous for giving the city a dramatic facelift, restoring many of the ancient monuments and making grandiose classical marble tables, which were often gilded in gold to give a dazzling effect of wealth, just like in the Roman times.

=== Venice and the Veneto ===
Venice and the Veneto were still famous for making their grand and extravagant Rococo mirrors, amongst the best and most expensive in Europe. Their interiors were still very rich in style, and it took them a long time to change to the new Neoclassical style. However, with their mirrors going out of fashion, and in desperate need of money after 1797, the Venetians eventually gave in to the new style. Despite this, Venetian mirrors still had rich cartouches and were often gilded with gold.

== Furniture types ==
=== Mirrors ===
The Venetians were still the main glass and mirror-makers in Italy and produced amongst the best in the world. Venetian mirrors changed little during the Neoclassical period, and still had several cartouches and were often gilded. However, the shape of their girandole changed from being round to oblong.

=== Console tables ===
Console tables in Italy radically changed after the 1760s and 1770s. They were usually far plainer and more classical in style, with grand marble slabs and straight legs, which were often bulky and heavily decorated. But, at the same time, Venetian console tables were still mainly inspired by the Louis XV designs, but usually had plainer and simpler cabriole legs.

=== Commodes ===
Commodes in Italy changed really by region. Lombard commodes were often plain and bulky and were usually made in fruitwood, including ivory stringing. Yet Genoese and Venetian ones were slightly more Rococo, despite having considerable Neoclassical influences.

=== Armchairs ===
Surprisingly, Italian armchairs during the Neoclassical period made a return to the Baroque style, with heavy and bulky straight legs and sculptural carvings. They were usually quite bold, and Venetian and Genoese ones were often gilded, whilst Milanese armchairs were mainly left untouched.

== Gallery ==
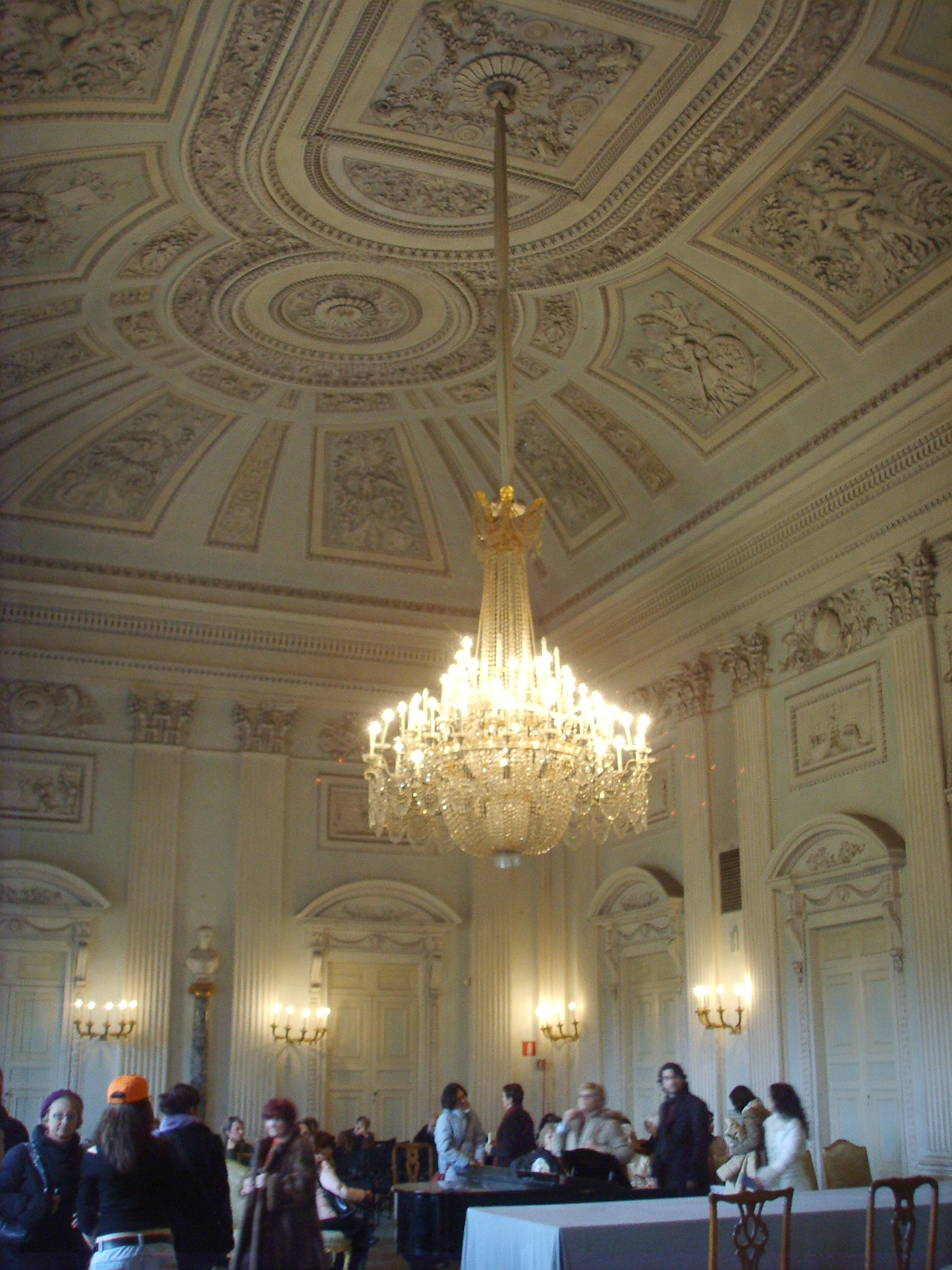
The Neoclassical "salone bianco" (White Hall) in the Villa di Poggio Imperiale.

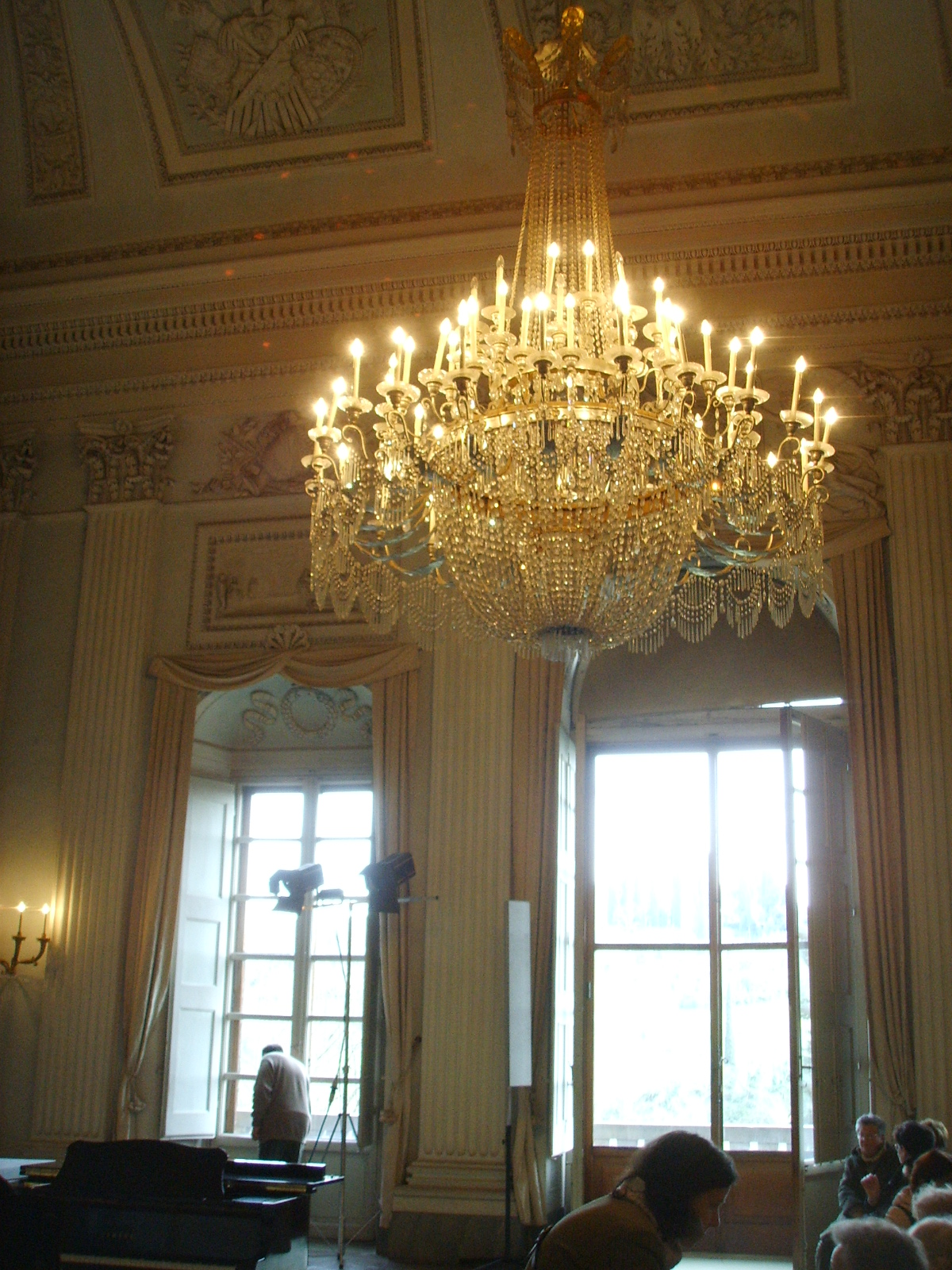
More views of the "salone".

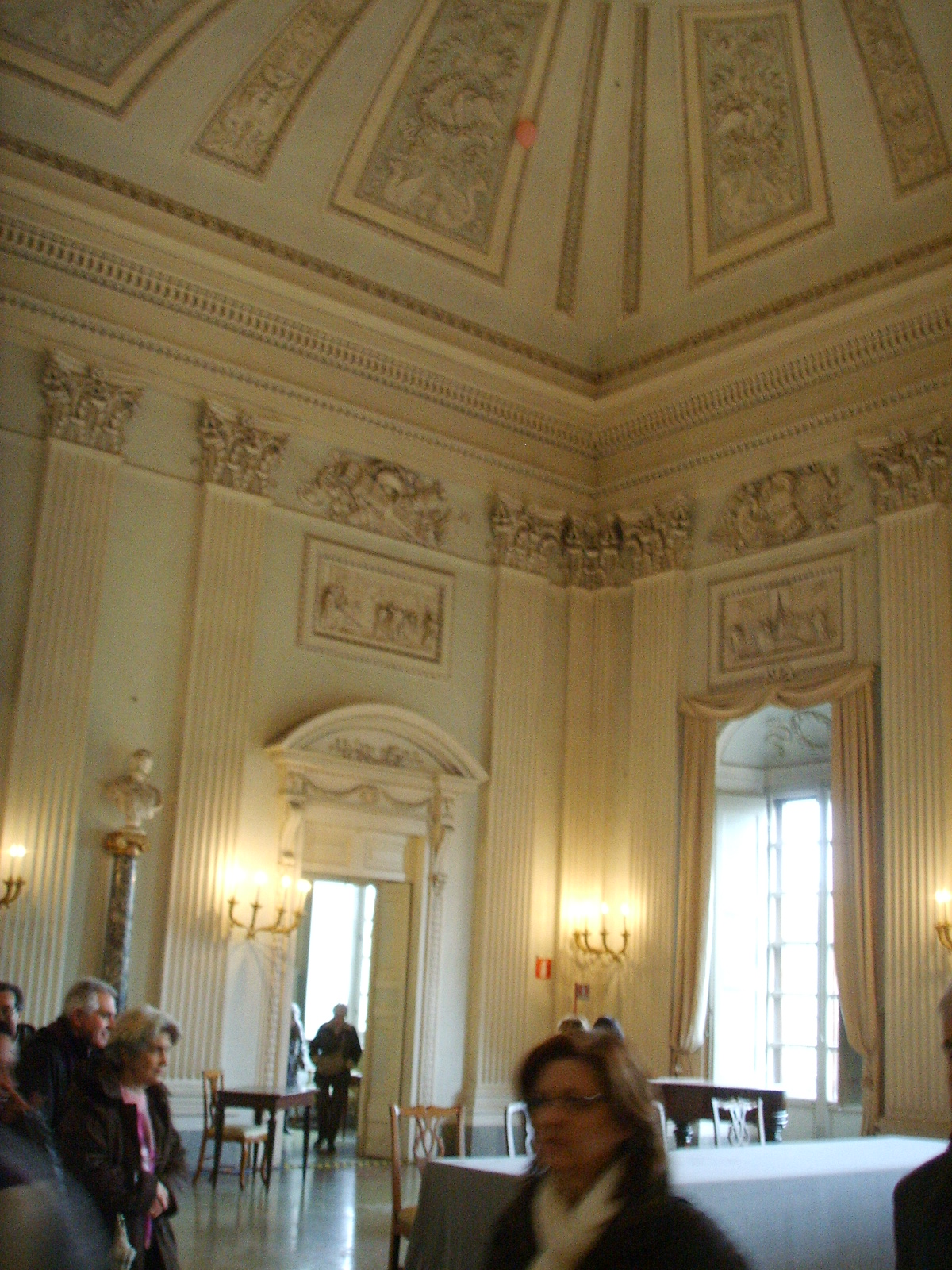
Still more views of the Villa's interiors.

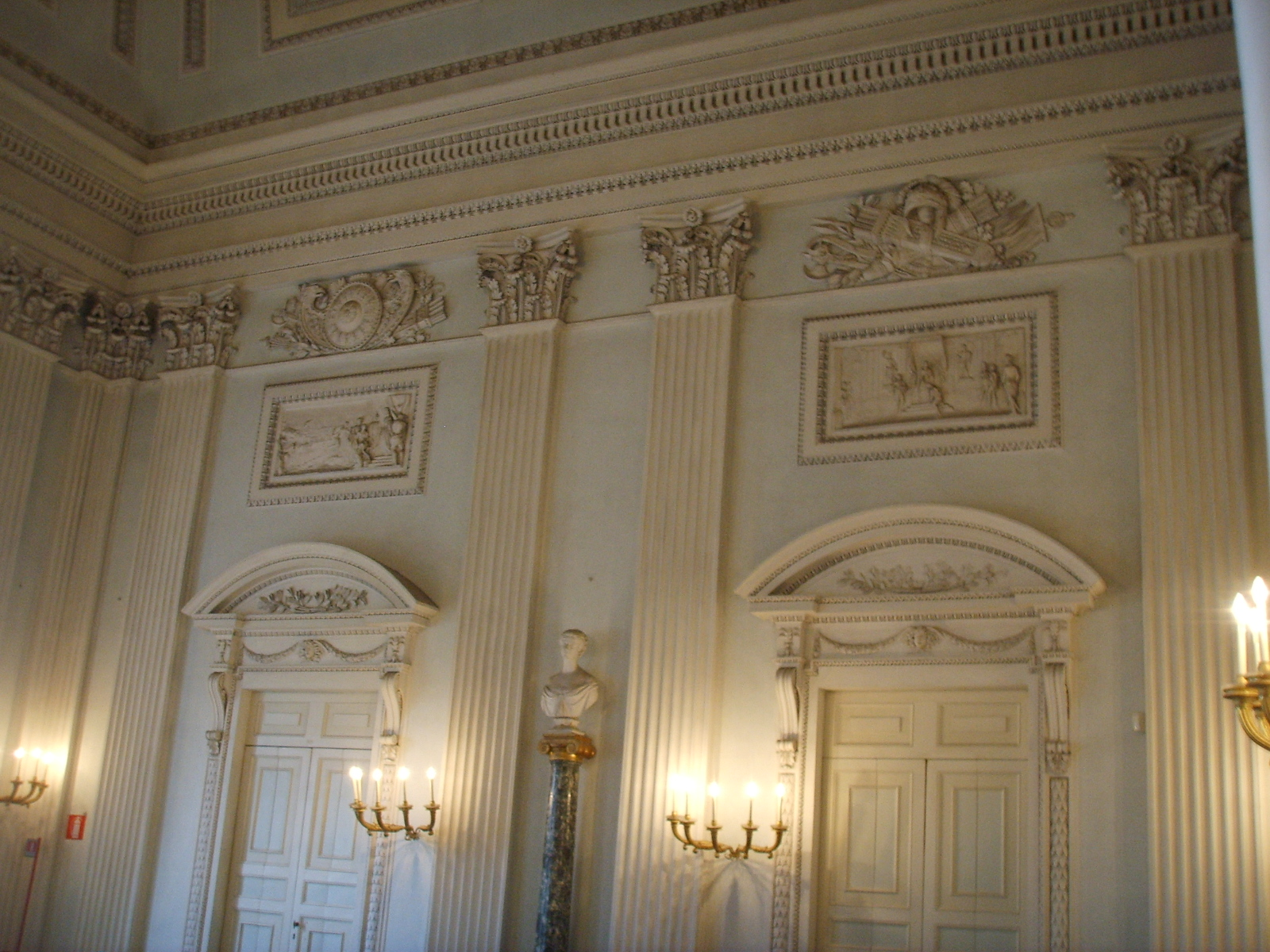
A closer look at the Villa's White Hall.

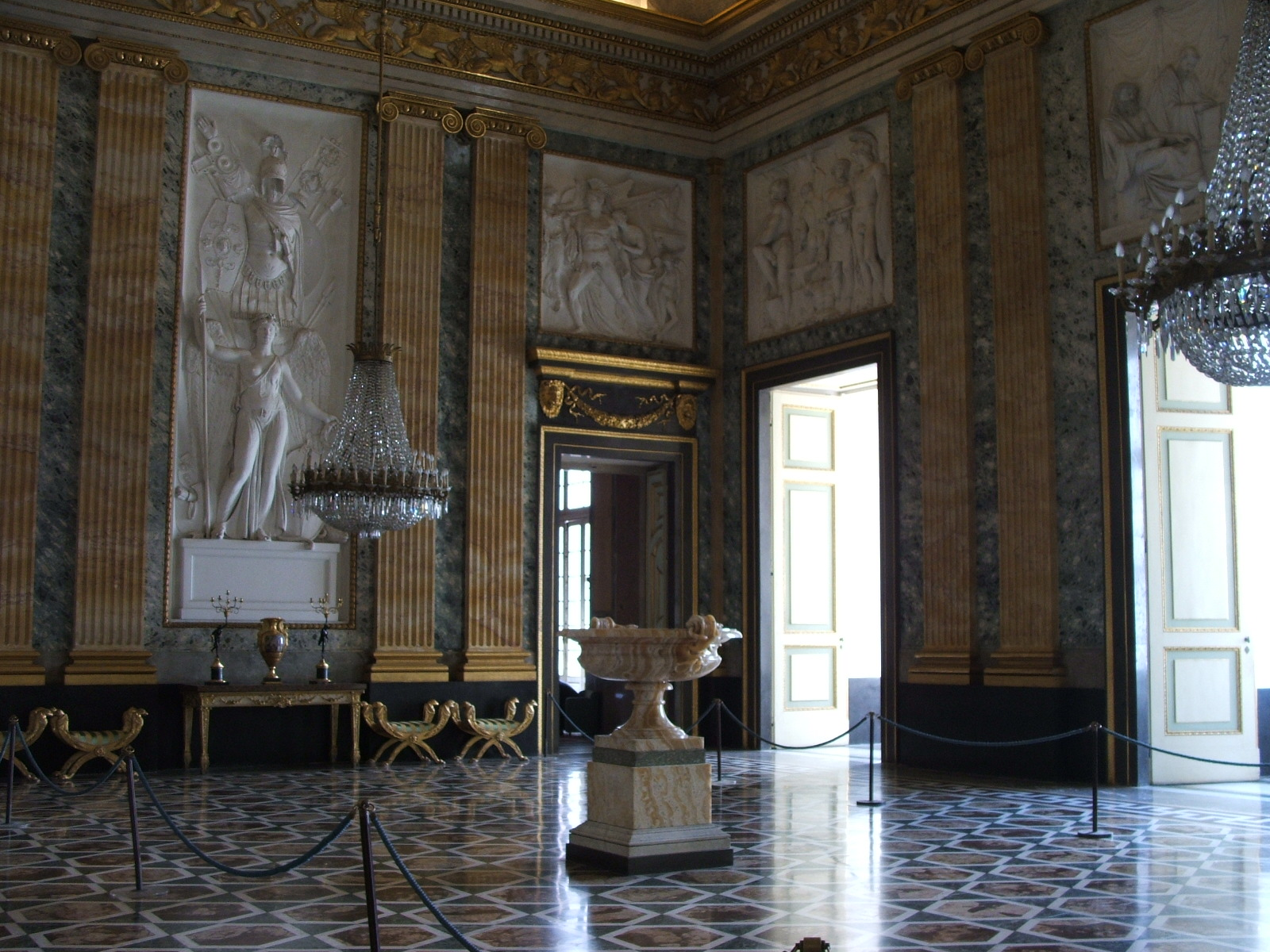
Neoclassical elegance in the Palace of Caserta.

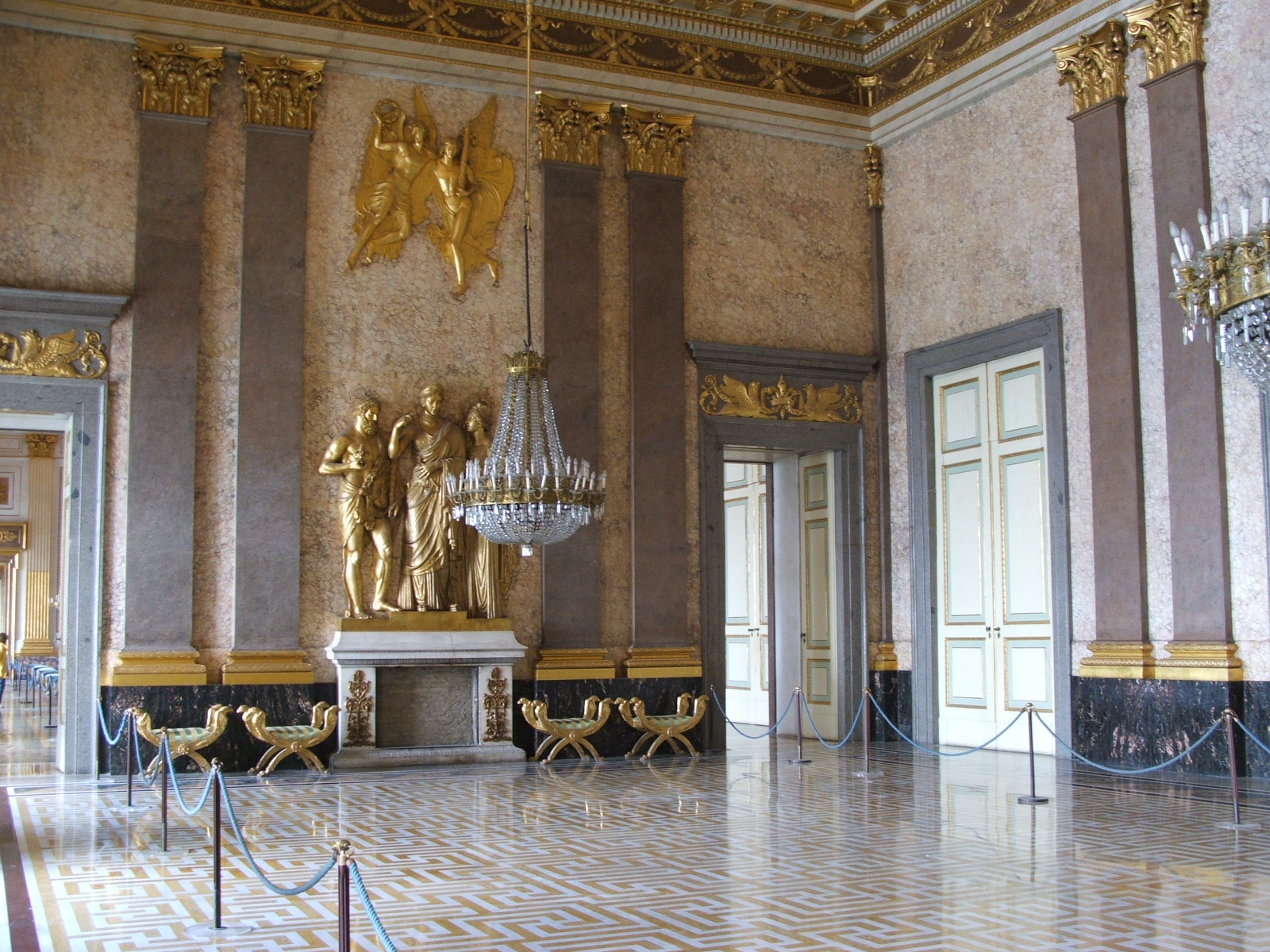
More Neoclassical interior views in the Palace.

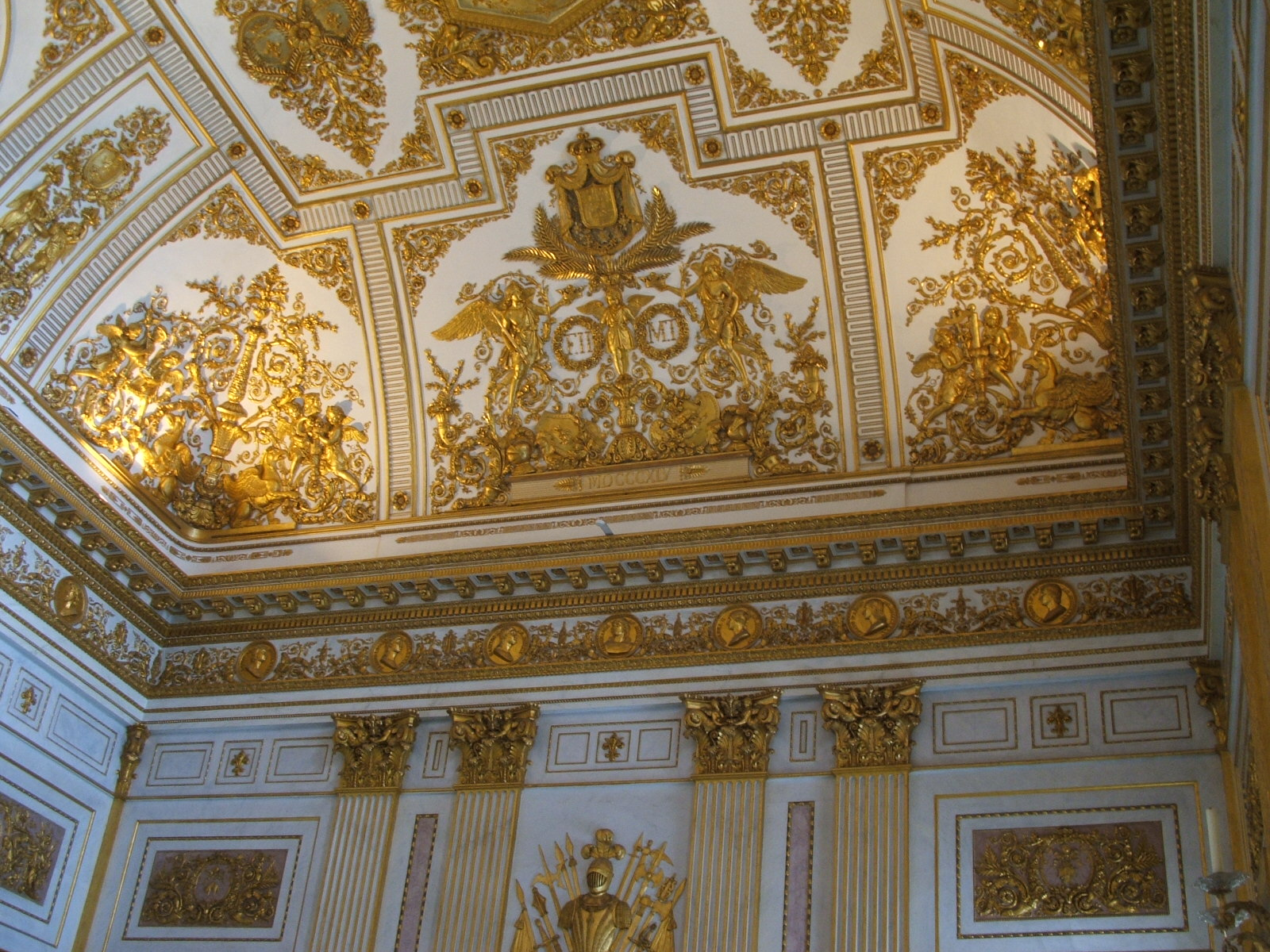
The intricate decorations on the ceiling of the palace.

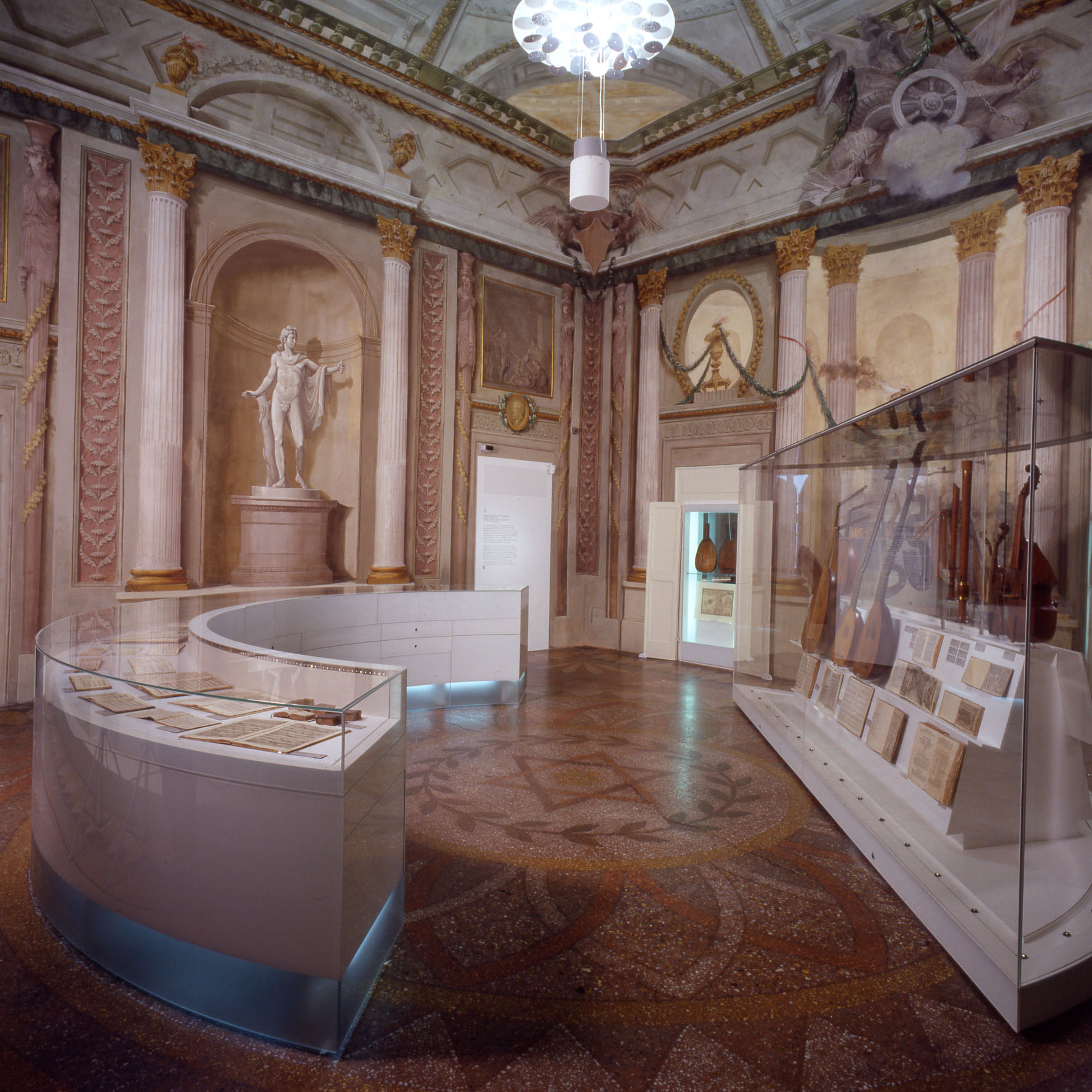
The "Sala della Musica" (Music Hall) in the Bologna Library.

== Bibliography ==
- Miller, Judith (2005). Furniture: world styles from classical to contemporary. DK Publishing. ISBN 0-7566-1340-X.
