= The Raising of Lazarus (Guercino) =

Painting by Guercino

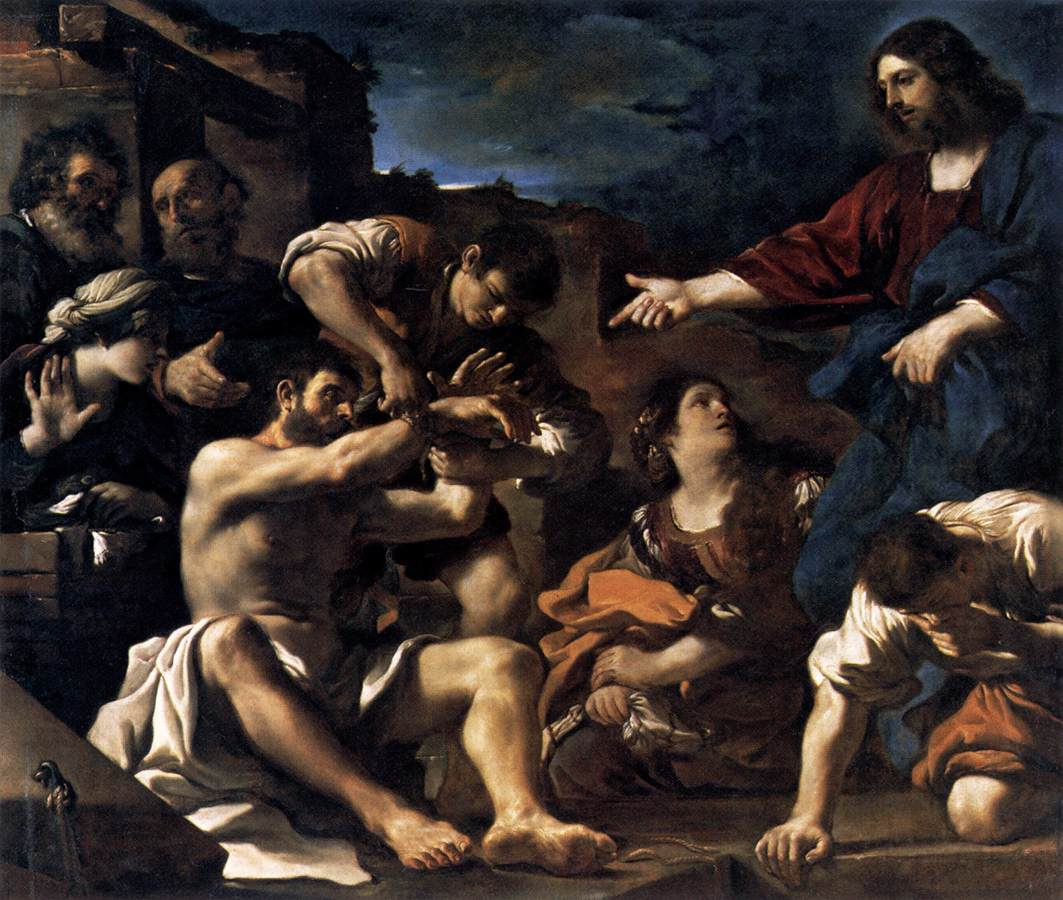
The Raising of Lazarus (1619) by Guercino

The Raising of Lazarus is a 1619 oil-on-canvas painting by the Italian Baroque artist Guercino, now in the Louvre Museum in Paris. A preparatory sketch for the work is now in the Metropolitan Museum of Art,

In 1682 it was recorded as being in the Naples collection of the brothers Carlo and Francesco Garofali. It was still in that city when Vivant Denon bought it for Louis XVI for 26,000 livres in 1785 and after the French Revolution it was exhibited at the Muséum des Arts. J. M. W. Turner saw it during the Peace of Amiens in 1802 and a copy of it appears in his "Louvre Sketchbook".
