= Hieronymus Joachims =

Austrian painter

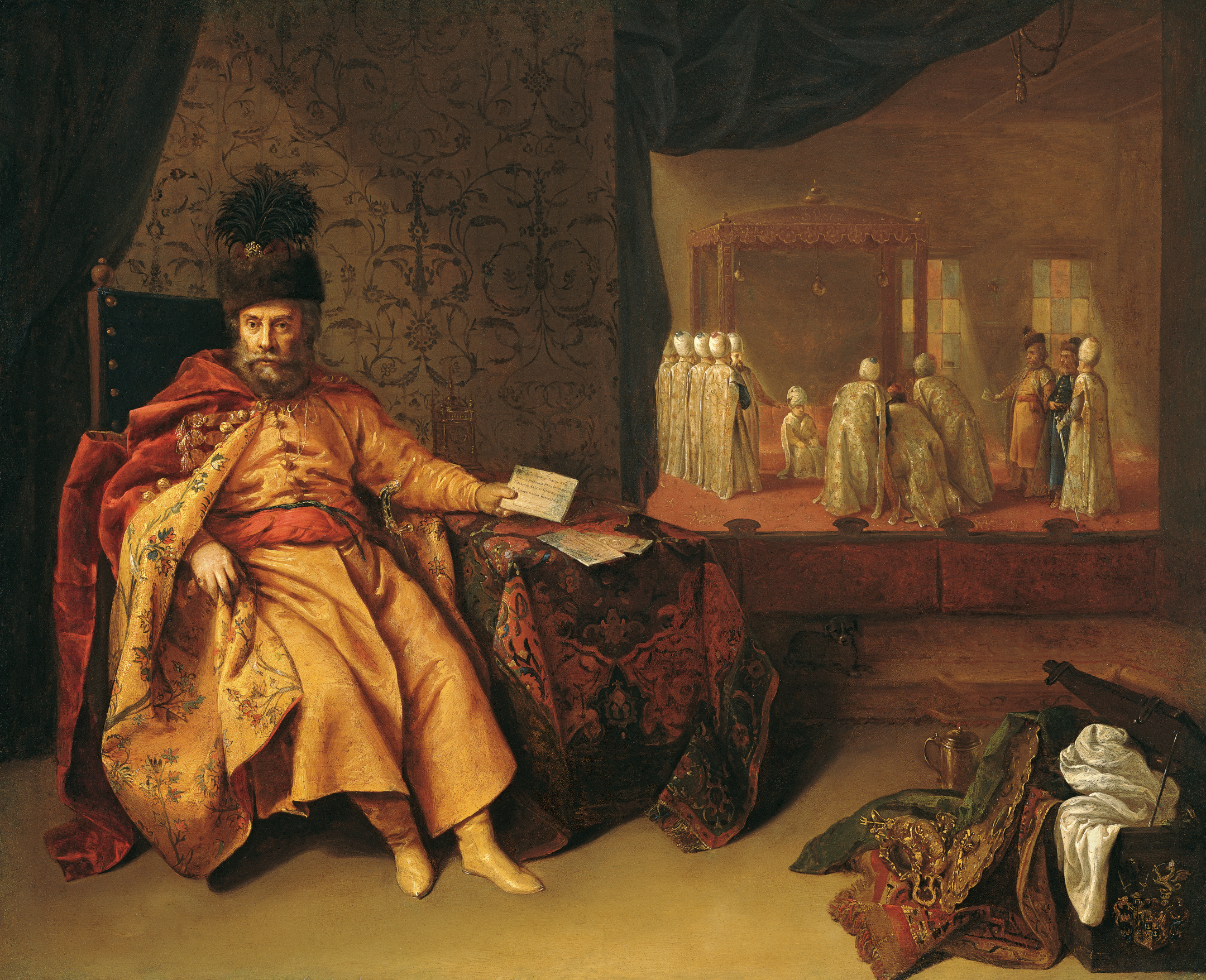
Portrait of Johann Rudolph Schmid by Hieronymus Joachims, 1651

Hieronymus Joachims (1619–1660) was an Austrian painter.

Joachims was born in Gemmingen, but he primarily worked and lived in Vienna. One of his works currently resides in the Fürstlich Lichtensteinische Gallery in Vaduz. He died in Vienna on 9 March 1660.
