= Barabino =

Barabino is a surname. Notable people with the surname include:

- Anna Maria Barabino (born 1966), Italian yacht racer
- Carlo Barabino (1768–1835), Italian architect
- Giacomo Barabino (1928–2016), Italian Roman Catholic bishop
- Gilda Barabino, American scientist and academic
- Nicolò Barabino (1831–1891), Italian painter
- Simone Barabino (c. 1585- c. 1620 or later), Italian painter
