= Basilica della Santissima Annunziata del Vastato =

Catholic cathedral in Genoa, Italy

Coordinates: 44°24′51″N 8°55′42″E

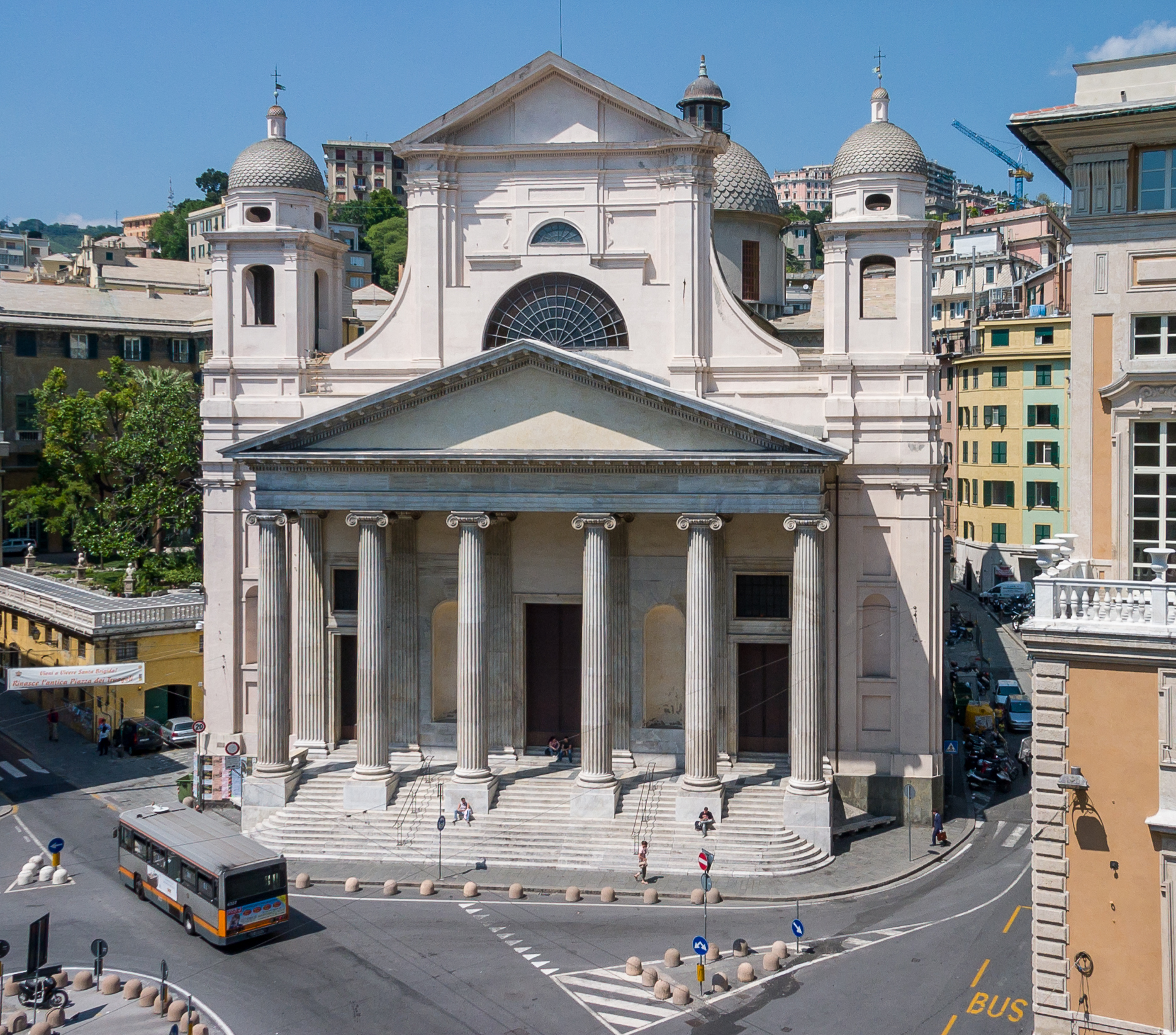
- Façade of the basilica

Religion
- Affiliation: Roman Catholic
- Province: Genoa
- Ecclesiastical or organisational status: National monument
- Status: Active

Location
- Location: Genoa, Italy
- Interactive map of Basilica della Santissima Annunziata del Vastato

Architecture
- Type: Church
- Style: Mannerist
- Groundbreaking: 1520
- Completed: 18c

The Basilica della Santissima Annunziata del Vastato is a prominent Roman Catholic church of Genoa, northern Italy; its decoration employed the major baroque studios and artists in Genoa in the 17th century.

It is named Vastato because the area where it was built was outside the walls of the city, in an area where houses had been demolished (devastated) for defensive reasons. In Latin, vastinium referred to a safety belt within the protective bastions.

== History ==
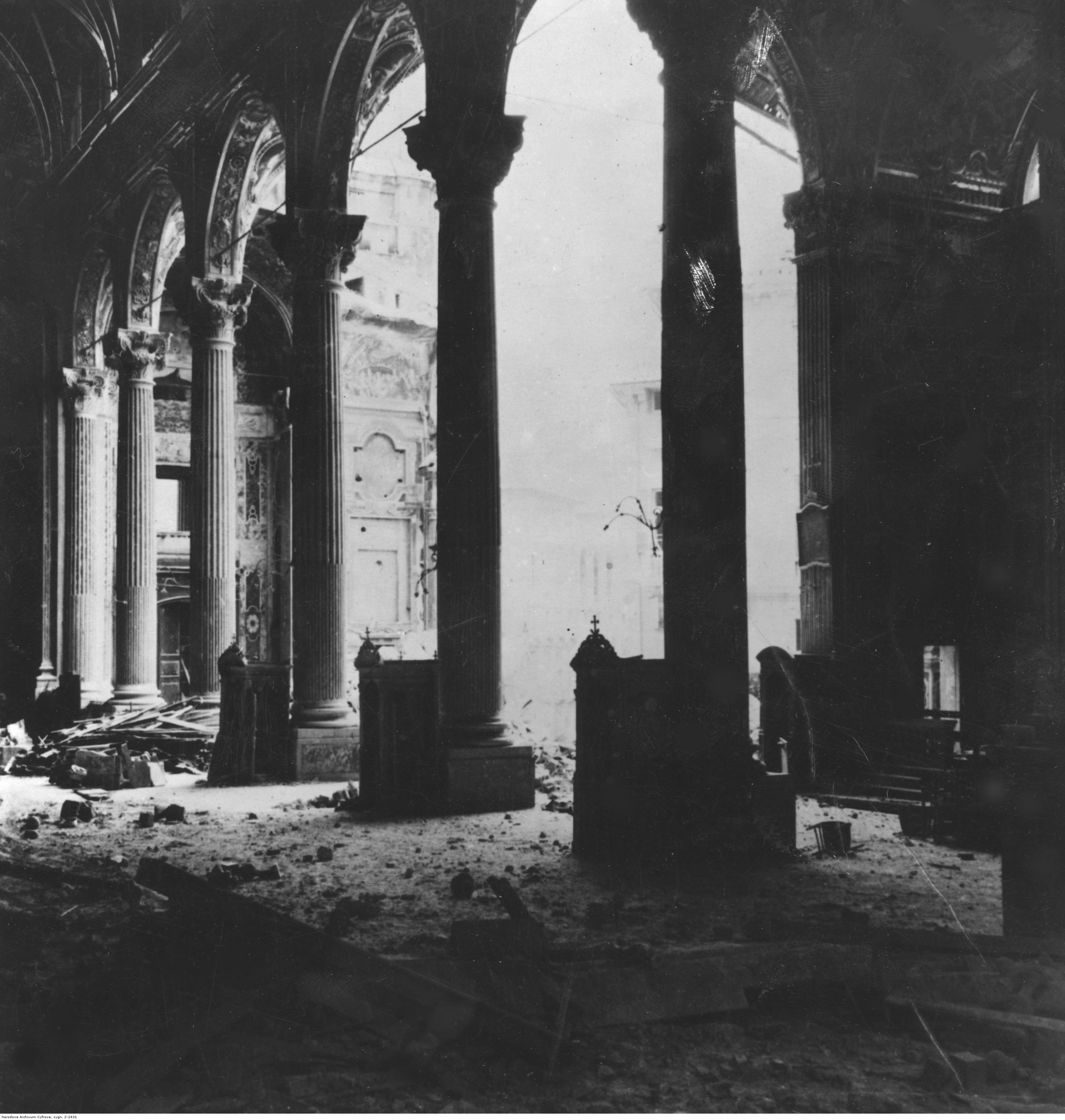
Destroyed interior in January 1944

The church was begun by the Franciscans in 1520 in a site previously occupied by the small church of Santa Maria del Prato, belonging to the Humiliati. Works were however halted in 1537. Starting in 1591 and continuing for decades, the prominent aristocratic Lomellini family patronized further refurbishment, directed by Taddeo Carlone. In the early 17th century the rich Baroque decoration was executed, with Andrea Ansaldo in charge of completing the works, and in particular the dome. The current Neoclassicist façade dates to 1830–1840s, designed by Carlo Barabino. The church was damaged by Allied bombings during World War II.

== Interior decoration of the nave ==
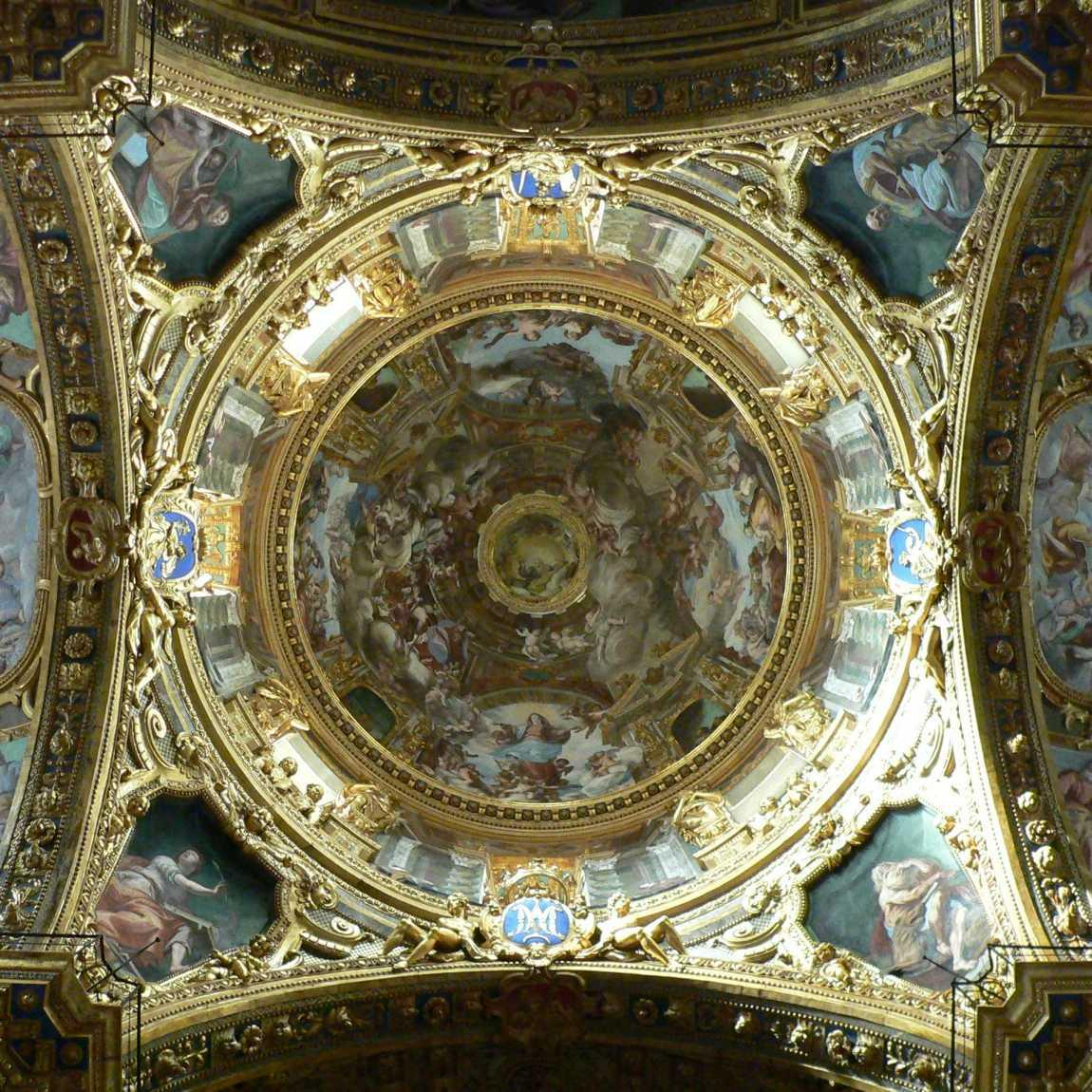
The dome

Artists responsible for the interior decoration include Giovanni Benedetto Castiglione with St. James defeats Moors; Giovanni Bernardo Carbone (GBC) with St. James opens Coimbra gates to King Ferdinand; Valerio Castello with Martyrdom of St. James and St. Peter christens St. James, Giovanni Domenico Cappellino with Preaching of the apostle, Domenico Piola with Martyrdom of the saint, Giovanni Lorenzo Bertolotti with Aurelio and Giovanni, Aurelio Lomi with Daughters of Zebedee introduce Jesus & saints.

At the central crossing, the cupola dome has an Assumption fresco, considered the masterpiece of Giovanni Andrea Ansaldo, and restored later by Gregorio De Ferrari. Above the door to the center nave is a Last Supper by Giulio Cesare Procaccini, flanked by two Prophets attributed to either Gioacchino Assereto, Giovanni Andrea Ansaldo or Giulio Benso; on the ceiling, canvases depicting an Epiphany, Entry to Jerusalem, and Prayer in the Garden by Giovanni Carlone, while the Resurrection, Jesus appears to his Mother and Coronation of Virgin were painted by his brother, Giovanni Battista Carlone.

== Decoration of chapels ==
The first chapel's right wall has a frescoed Nativity attributed to the Moncalvo; Agar & Angel by Giovanni Andrea de Ferrari. The ceiling is frescoed with Miracles by St. Bernardino and Simone & Giuda evangelizing Persians by Giovanni Battista Carlone.

The second chapel on the right has an altarpiece and a painting depicting Miracles of St. Bernardino, as well as a ceiling fresco of Catechism of St. Matthew by G.B. Carlone and another Miracle painting by Aurelio Lomi.

The third chapel is frescoed by St. Thomas Aquinas before Crucifixion by Domenico Piola, and Saint Diego cures a blind child by Simone Barabino; Martyrdom of St. Sebastian and the ceiling St. James baptizes pagans by G.B. Carlone, and on the left wall is a St. Jerome by Bernardo Strozzi.

The fourth chapel has an altarpiece of St. Louis G.B. Carlone; on the walls, two episodes from the life of the saint, attributed to Claudius Francisco Beaumont; the vault is frescoed with Sant'Andrea adores the Cross by Domenico Fiasella.

The fifth chapel has an altarpiece of St. Peter of Alcantara adores the Cross by G.B. Carlone; the wall has an Ecstasy of young Saint Francis attributed to Daniele Crespi; on the left a Madonna and Saints by Antonio Maria Piola under a fresco of Supper at Emmaus attributed to Strozzi; on the vault is frescoed St, Paul Preaching by Fiasella.

The sixth chapel has an Annunciation altarpiece by Domenico Piola. The walls have paintings of a Presentation, Visitation and Prophet by Andrea Carlone; on the vault is frescoed St. Peter cures the lame by Gioacchino Assereto. The polychrome St. Anthony of Padua, Infant Jesus, & angels was sculpted by Pierre Puget; on the vault is frescoed Pentecost, and in the lunette over the arch that accesses the far chapel is Doubting St. Thomas, a fresco by G.B. Carlone.

The chapel to the right of the altar has a Blessed Andrea da Spello draws water from a stone, a canvas by G.B. Carlone; on the altar in the front, a Madonna sculpture by Leonardo Mirano (1618); to the right, Saint Domenico Soriano, altarpiece by Tommaso Clerici. On the left are three archangels by Clerici; on the cupola are frescoes by G.B. Carlone.

On the main altar is a Crucifixion by Giacomo Antonio Ponsonelli; on the ceiling, Annunciation and Assumption, on the sidewalls, Presentation of Jesus in temple, all frescos by Giulio Benso; and Dispute with the doctors, painted from G.B. Carlone on design by Benso.

In the chapel to the left of the altar, on the right wall is a Nativity, by Luciano Borzone; beneath it is a high relief in marble by Santo Varni of the Madonna & Saints, on the altar in the front, Madonna & Child sculpted by Leonardo Ferrandina; on the altar on the left is a Crucifixion by Francisco Scotto; to right, St. Peter denies Christ and Joseph explains dreams, by Strozzi; on the left, Wedding at Cana and Christ at column, perhaps by Luca Saltarello; and frescoes by Giuseppe Isola.

In the left transept, in the niche over the altar is a San Pasquale adoring Holy Name, a polychrome work by Anton Maria Maragliano; in the ceiling and in the lunettes over the arched entrance to the far chapel, an Ascension and Supper at Emmaus, fresco by Giovanni Carlone.

The tympanum of the sixth chapel (left of the nave) is frescoed with a Madonna sculpted by Taddeo Carlone; on the vault is frescoed Abraham offers bread & wine to Melchisedech, by Assereto.

The first chapel on the left has two canvases of the Martyrdom of St. Clemente (altar and wall) by G.B. Carlone; above a St. Lorenzo and St. Stefano, canvases by De Ferrari; on the outer vault are the damaged frescoes of Joshua crossing Jordan by G.B. Carlone.

The fourth chapel on the left has an altarpiece of the Immaculate Conception by Domenico Piola. The third chapel has a "Crucifixion" by Luca Cambiaso; on the left, Saint Francesco baptizes Moors by G.B. Carlone. The second chapel has an altarpiece of the Transit by St. Clair by Giovanni Battista Paggi.

The fifth chapel has Hope and Charity, statues by Ponsonelli; on the vault is frescoed Rebecca at the well by Fiasella.

== Sources ==
http://www.irolli.it/chiesa_genova/4/chiesa-di-santissima-annunziata-del-vastato.html
