= San Siro, Genoa =

Roman Catholic Basilica in Genoa, Italy

Coordinates: 44°24′42″N 8°55′49″E

Basilica of San Siro
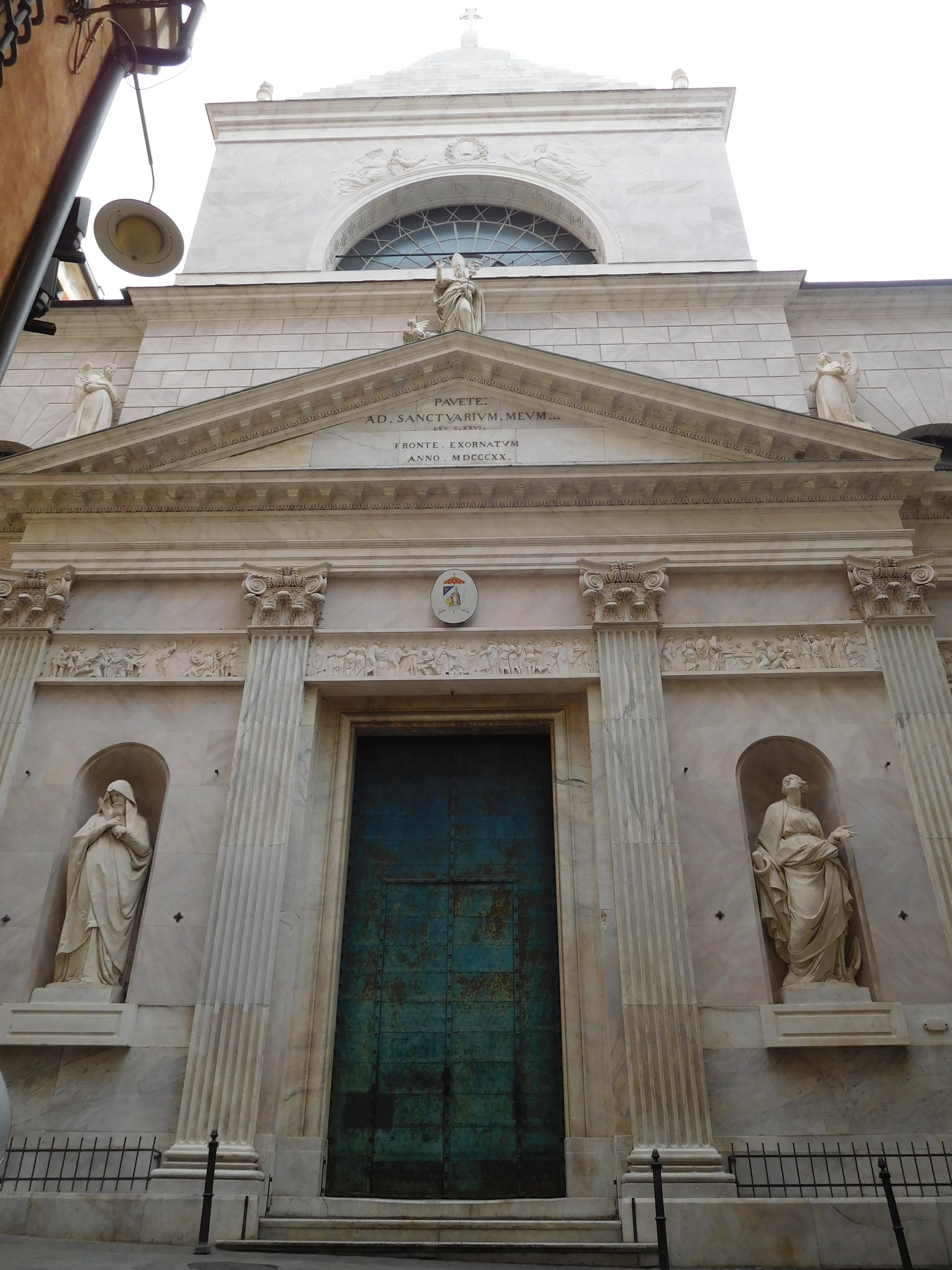

Religion
- Affiliation: Roman Catholic
- Province: Genoa Liguria

Location
- Location: Genoa, Italy
- Interactive map of Basilica of San Siro

Architecture
- Type: Church
- Style: Baroque

San Siro is a Roman Catholic basilica located on the street of the same name, in the quartiere of the Maddalena in central Genoa, Liguria, Italy.

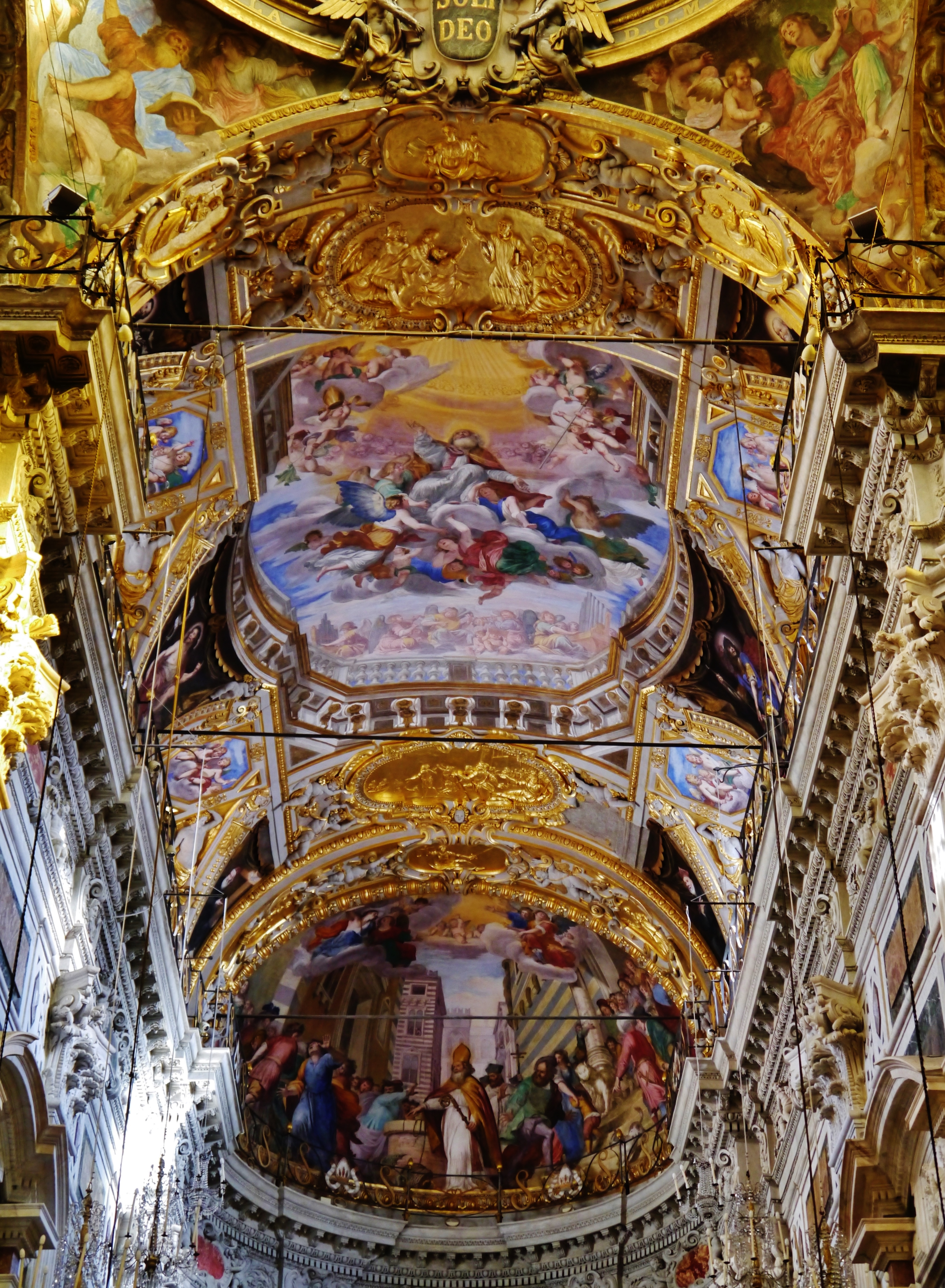
Vaults frescoed by Carlone

== History ==
One of the oldest churches in the city, it occupies the site of a former church originally dedicated to the apostles. In later centuries, the church was renamed after St Syrus of Genoa, a beatified bishop. Originally the cathedral of Genoa, it stood outside of the original walls, and was vulnerable to attacks from Saracen pirates; the title of cathedral was transferred to San Lorenzo. There is another church dedicated to San Siro, San Siro di Struppa, outside the city center.

Legend holds that the bishop was able to banish a basilisk that dwelt in a well adjacent to the church; a plaque on a nearby house recalls the miracle. This event is represented in a medieval bas relief on the portico arcade next to the church, as well as a fresco by Carlone in the apse.

From the tenth to twelfth centuries, building of the original Romanesque structure of the church and bell tower proceeded. The bishops Hugh of Grenoble and William of Orange preached the crusade at some point during the summer of 1096, inspiring the Genoese to send a fleet of 13 ships to aid the forces of the First Crusade. In 1478, a fire destroyed much of the church. Nearly a century later, prodded by Cardinal Vincenzo Giustiniani and the Pallavicini family, reconstruction was begun following the demands of Counter-Reformation architecture, with a main central nave. That nave was frescoed by Giovanni Battista Carlone with Conversion of St Peter, Martyrdom of St. Peter, and Death of Simon Magus. Paolo Brozzi completed the quadratura decoration. The chapel of the Pietà was commissioned by Taddeo Carlone in 1595 (and completed by 1606 by the marble-carvers Santino Paracca, called Valsoldo, and Alessandro Ferrandino). In 1904, the romanesque bell-tower, due to its perilous situation had to be demolished and was never rebuilt.

Other works of art include the Triumph of the Cross in the cupola by Carlone, and canvases of the Annunciation, Birth of Mary, and St Anthony by Orazio Gentileschi (the brother of Aurelio Lomi). Other artists with paintings in the church include Domenico Fiasella, Giovanni Domenico Cappellino, Andrea Semino, Giacomo Lomellini, Cristoforo Roncalli, Gregorio De Ferrari, Domenico Piola (2nd chapel on right), and a Decapitation of Saint by Carlo Bononi . The church contains a number of sculptures by Taddeo Carlone. The main altar design and sculpture were completed by Pierre Puget.

== Sources ==
- Pareto, Lorenzo; Camillo Pallavicino; Massimiliano Spinola; Giovanni Cristoforo Gandolfi (1846). Descrizione di Genova e del Genovesato, Volumen III. Tipografia Ferrando. pp. 112–114.
