= Syrus of Genoa =

Italian saint and bishop

Saint Syrus of Genoa
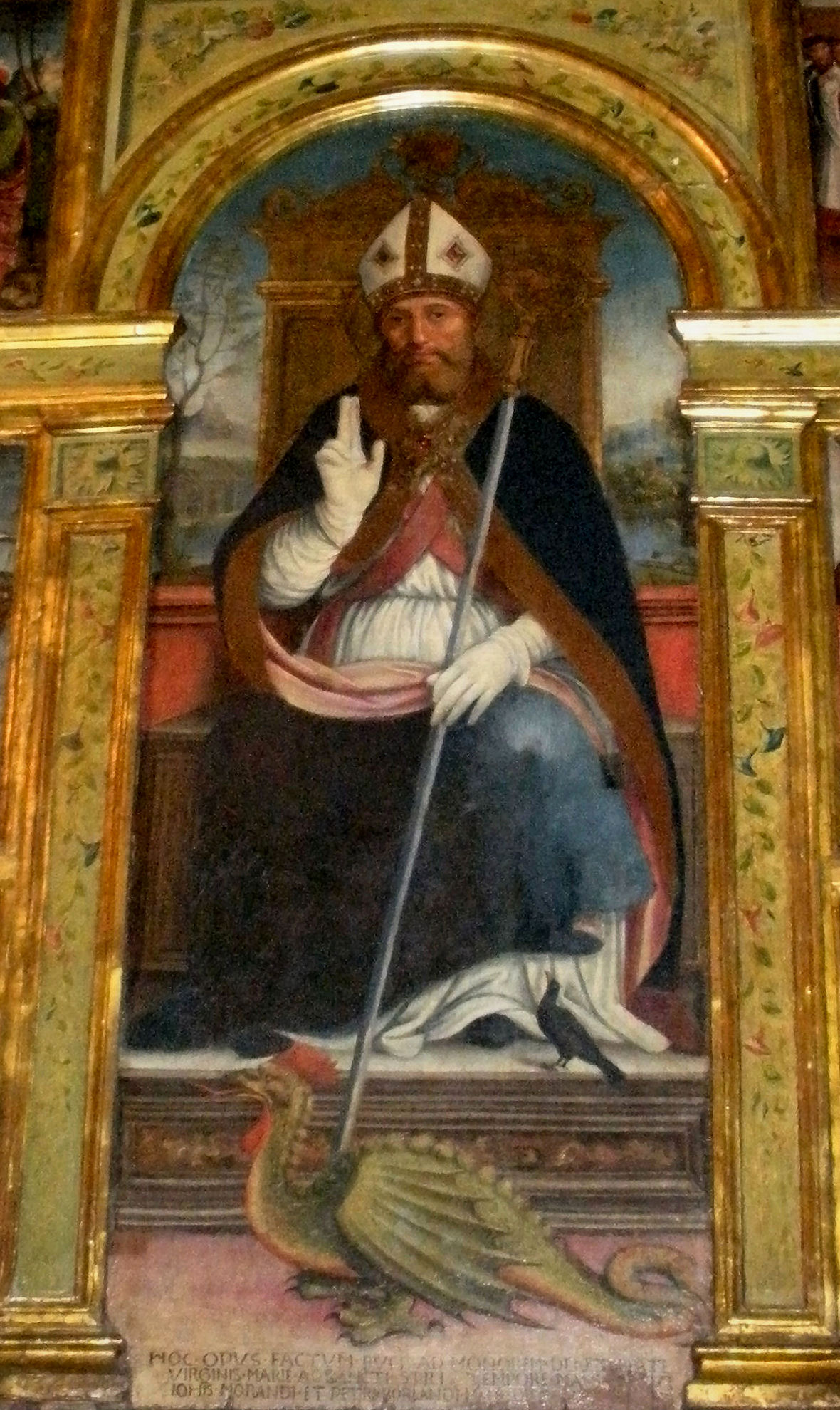

Bishop of Genoa
- Died: June 29, 381 AD
- Feast: June 29; July 7 (translation of his relics; in Genoa)
- Attributes: A blackbird
- Patronage: Genoa

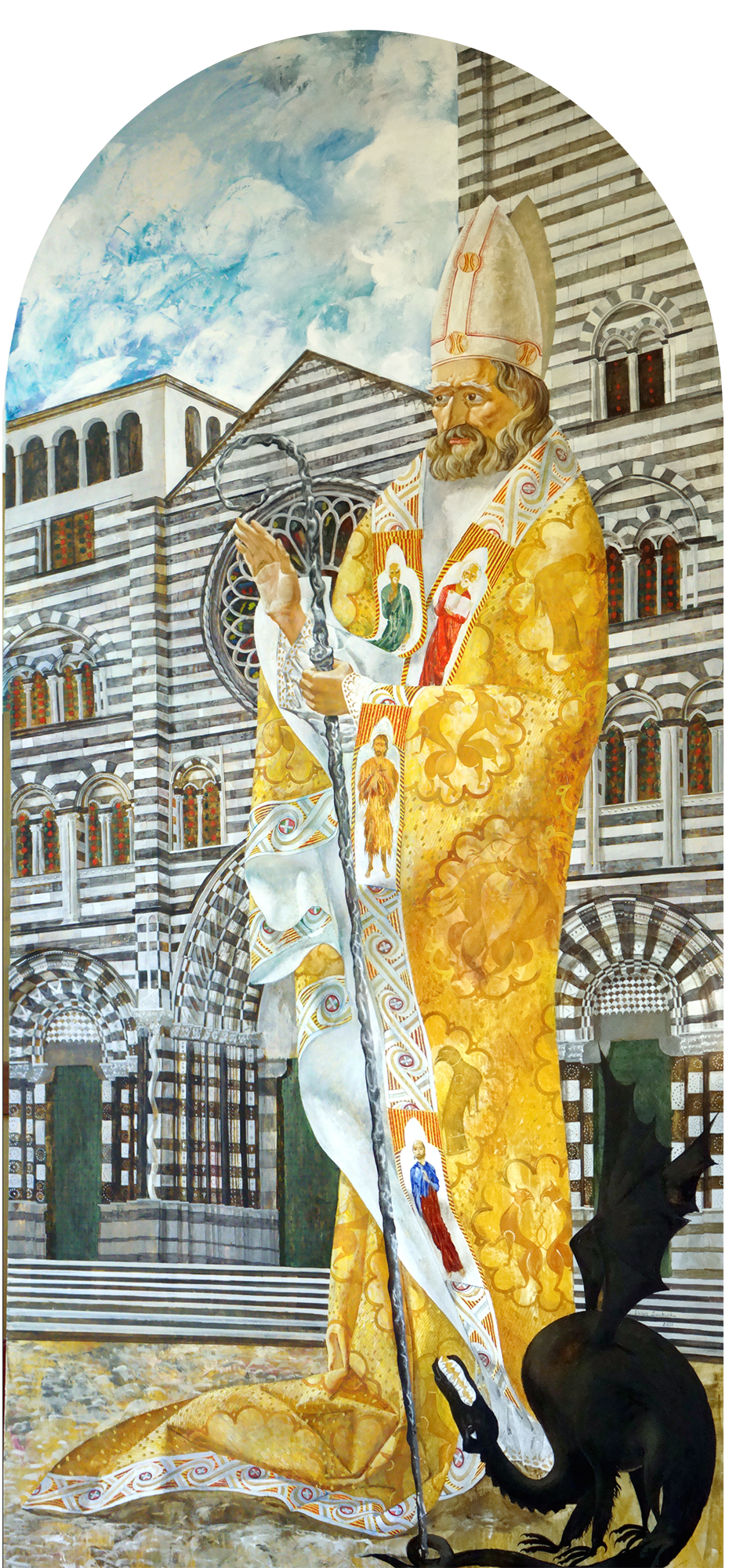
Syrus of Genoa. Painted by Denys Savchenko. St Peter and St. Therese of Child Jesus Church. Genoa, Italy

Saint Syrus of Genoa (Italian: San Siro di Genova) (died around June 29, 381 AD) was a priest and later bishop of Genoa during the fourth century AD.

== Life ==
Born at Struppa, a neighborhood of Genoa, he had a reputation for holiness and zeal. He succeeded Saint Felix as bishop of Genoa, having previously been parish priest at Saint Romulus (or "San Remo"). He died at an advanced age of natural causes and was buried in the city. He is the main patron of the city of Genoa.

== Miracles ==
As a boy, Saint Syrus is reputed to have brought his pet blackbird back to life by means of his saliva. Later, walking with his father in the hills above, he wished that a boat making for port might be still, whereupon the wind died and the ship came to a halt as if at anchor. Asking his father for permission to go on board, St. Syrus expressed his wish the boat might land, whereupon the wind returned and the boat freely entered the harbor.

A legend holds that the bishop was able to banish a basilisk that dwelt in a well adjacent to the Church of the Twelve Apostles; a plaque on a nearby house recalls the miracle. This event is represented in a medieval bas relief on the portico arcade next to the church, as well as a fresco by Carlone in the apse.

== Veneration ==
The Basilica of San Siro is one of the oldest churches in Genoa. It occupies the site of a former church originally dedicated to the twelve apostles. In later centuries, the church was renamed after St Syrus. Originally it was the cathedral of Genoa, but it stood outside of the original walls, and was vulnerable to attacks from Saracen pirates; the title of Cathedral was transferred to San Lorenzo.

There is another church dedicated to San Siro, San Siro di Struppa, outside the city center.
