= Oratory of San Giacomo della Marina =

Coordinates: 44°24′19″N 8°55′43″E

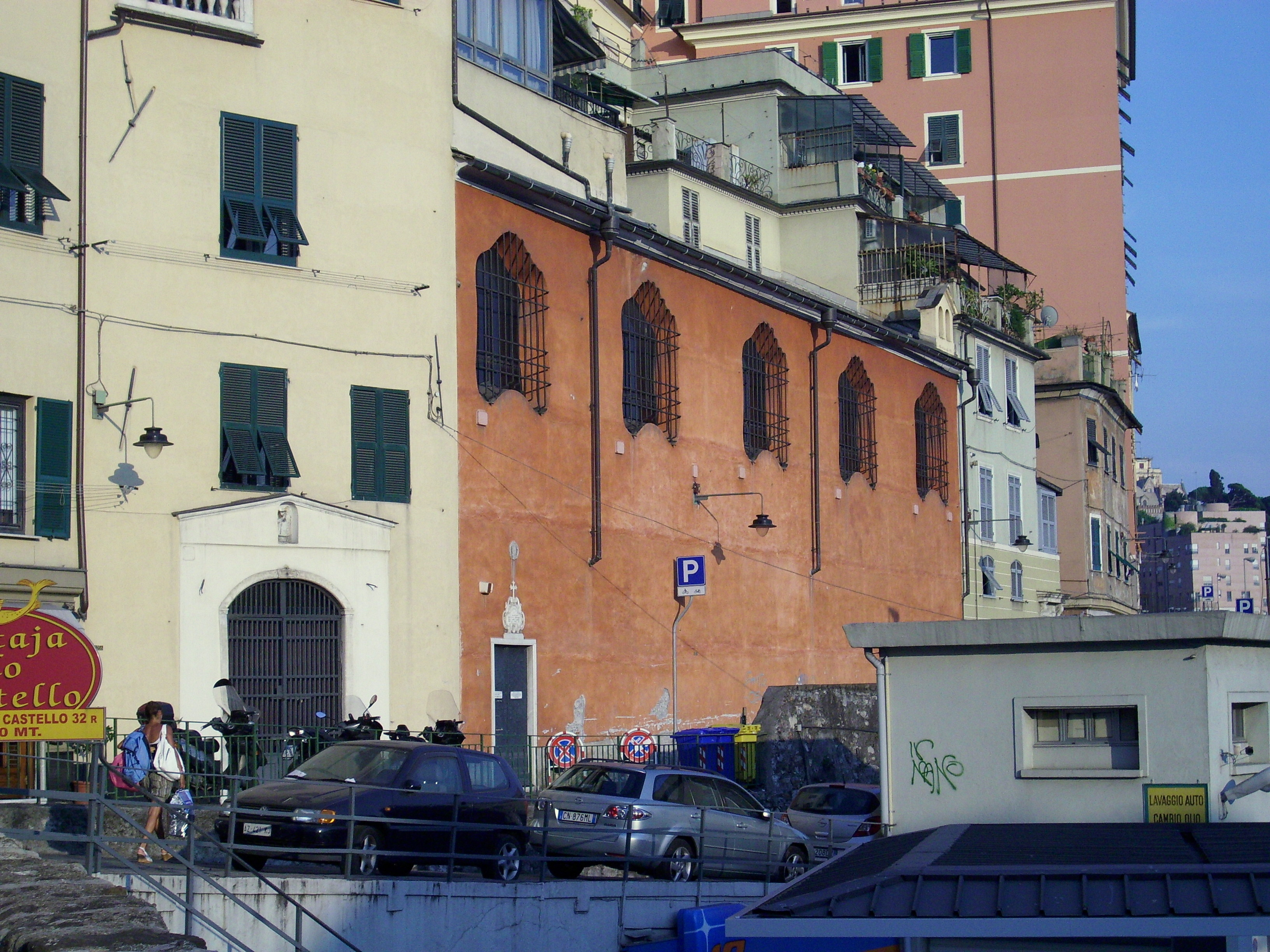
View of the Oratory.

The Oratorio di San Giacomo della Marina (translated as Oratory of St. James of the Marina) is a small chapel or prayer-house at the dockside in Genoa, northern Italy.

Erected in 1453, the oratory was rebuilt and decorated in the 17th century. Twelve large canvasses illustrating the saint and patron of the battle against the Moors, Saint James, were completed by major Genoese Baroque artists including:

- Giovanni Benedetto Castiglione (il Grechetto) - St. James defeats the Moors
- Giovanni Battista Carlone - St. James Opens the Gates of Coimbra to King Ferdinand and Martyrdom of St. James
- Valerio Castello - Saint Peter Baptizes St. James
- Giovanni Domenico Cappellino - St. James Preaching
- Domenico Piola Martyrdom of the Saint
- Giovanni Lorenzo Bertolotto - The Invention of the Spoglia
- Aurelio Lomi - Sons of Zebedee with Jesus

The exterior of the oratory is unadorned. The confraternity was active in religious processions during past centuries.

== Sources ==
- Genovanet entry
- Comune di Genova entry
