= Simone Barabino =

Italian painter

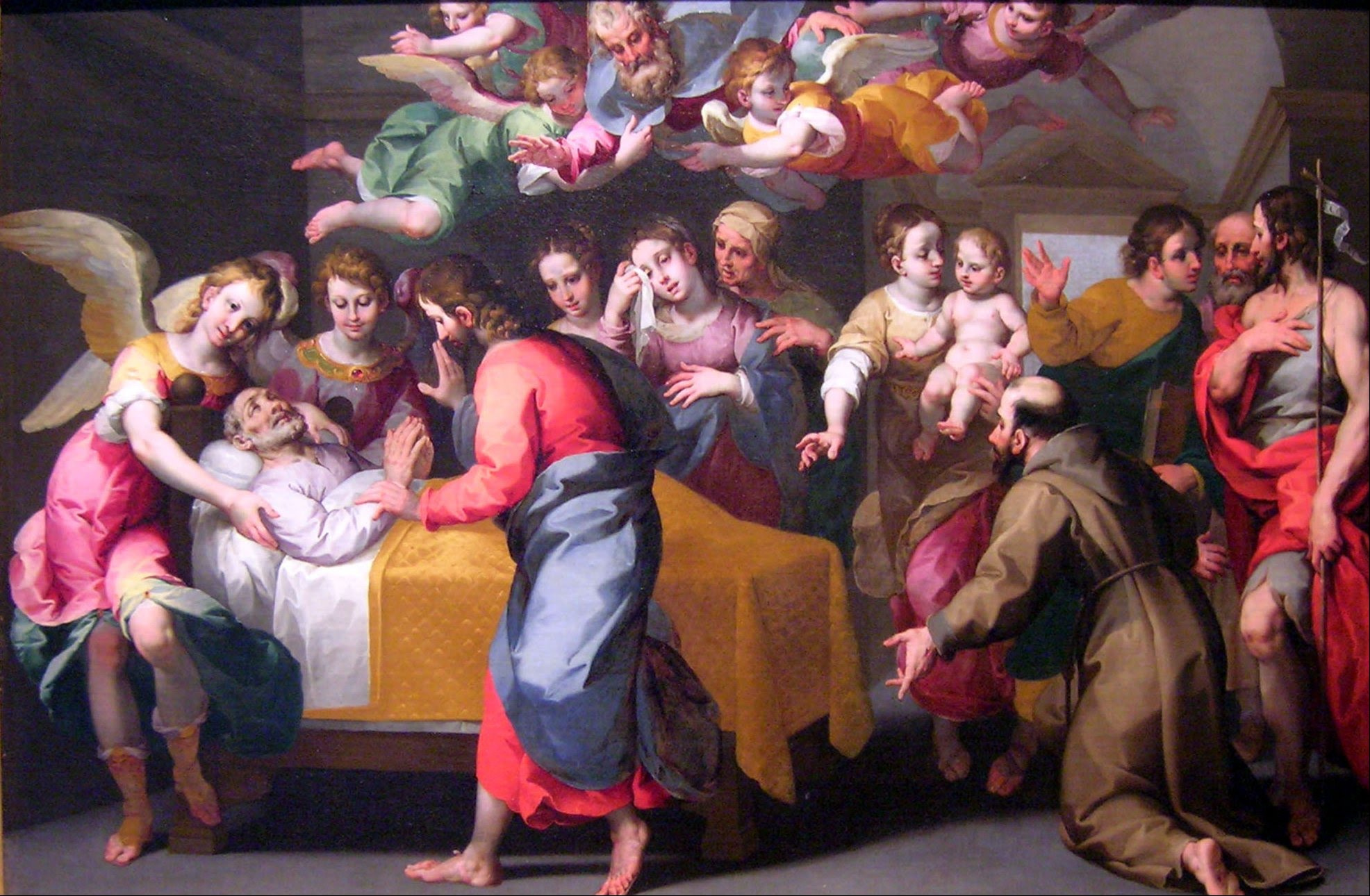
The Death of Saint Joseph by Simone Barabino, Philbrook Museum of Art, 1620

Simone Barabino (c. 1585 – c. 1620 or later) was an Italian painter of the late-Mannerist style. Born in Val de Polcevera, near Genoa, he was mainly active in his native city, where he trained with Bernardo Castello. He later feuded with his master and left for Milan, where after some works, he stopped painting. Notable works include San Diego restoring sight to blind child for the Nunziata del Guastato in Genoa and Dead Christ with the Virgin and Saints Michael and Andrew for the church of San Girolamo at Milan. He died in penury. Lanzi says he quit his profession and turned to merchandise, in which he did not succeed, and that be died in prison. The exact date of his death is not known, but he may have been quite old when he died.

== Bibliography ==
- Ticozzi, Stefano (1830). Dizionario degli architetti, scultori, pittori, intagliatori in rame ed in pietra, coniatori di medaglie, musaicisti, niellatori, intarsiatori d'ogni etá e d'ogni nazione' (Volume 1). Milan: Gaetano Schiepatti. p. 105.
- Bryan, Michael (1886). Robert Edmund Graves (ed.). Dictionary of Painters and Engravers, Biographical and Critical. Vol. I: A-K. London: George Bell and Sons. p. 77.
