= Music of Liguria =

The Music of Liguria flourished in the 19th century for a number of reasons. The capital city of Genoa, a major port, aspired to recognition as a cultural center more in keeping with its role as a major city in the history of the Risorgimento, the political, social, and military movement that eventually led to the unification of the modern nation state of Italy. (After all, Garibaldi had sailed from that very port on his famous expedition against the Kingdom of Naples in 1860.)

== Genoa ==
The Teatro Carlo Felice, built in 1828 in Genoa, and named for the monarch of the then kingdom of Sardinia (which included the present regions of Sardinia, Piedmont and Liguria). The theater was the center of music and social life in the 1800s. On various occasions in the history of the theater, presentations have been conducted by Mascagni, Richard Strauss, Hindemith and Stravinsky.

On the occasion of the Christopher Columbus celebration in 1992, new musical life was given to the area around the old port, including the restoration of the house of Paganini and presentations of the Trallalero, the traditional singing of Genoese dock workers. Additionally, the city is the site of the Teatro Gustavo Modena, the only theater to have survived the bombings of World War II relatively intact. The city is the site of the Niccolò Paganini music conservatory. In the town of Santa Margherita Ligure, the ancient Abbey of Cervara is often the site of chamber music concerts.

== Other parts of Liguria ==
The town of Sanremo is best known for the annual Sanremo Festival of Italian popular music, the largest venue for new pop music in Italy. Opera in San Remo is staged at the Theater of the Municipal Casino, a large gambling palace built in the early 1900s to take advantage of increased tourism along the French and Italian Riviera. Also, the town of Cervo has hosted for 40 years one of the most prestigious chamber music festivals in Europe.

The Teatro Civico of La Spezia, originally from 1848, was recently rebuilt into a 1000-seat multi-function theater. Increasingly, it now hosts live various music of various kinds. The Teatro Chiabrera theater in the town of Savona has historically been the main venue for almost all musical and stage productions in the city. It has undergone recent restoration and has reopened.
