= Giovanni Lorenzo Bertolotti =

Italian painter (1640–1721)

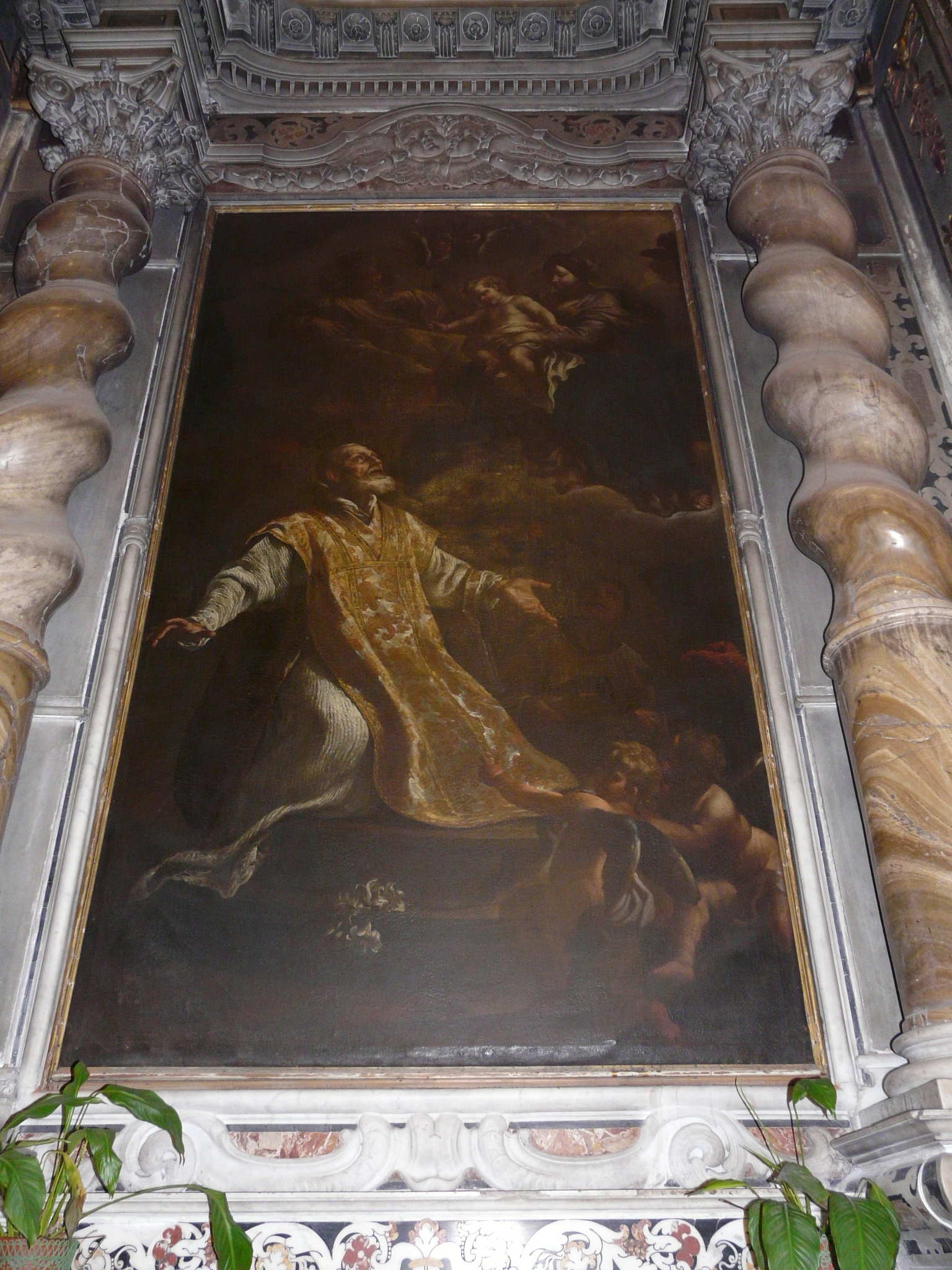
St Philip Neri in contemplation of the Virgin and Child, altarpiece in the church of Santi Nicolò ed Erasmo (Voltri)

Giovanni Lorenzo Bertolotti (1640–1721) was an Italian painter of the Baroque period, active in Genoa.

Bertolotti specialized in paintings having scenes of a mythological, historical or religious nature as subjects.

He trained under Giovanni Benedetto Castiglione. Bertolotti contributed paintings to the Oratory of San Giacomo della Marina and the Basilica della Santissima Annunziata. He painted a Visitation of the Virgin to Saint Elizabeth for the church of La Visitazione.
