= Sant'Antonio Abate, Milan =

Church in Milan, Italy

Coordinates: 45°27′41″N 9°11′36″E

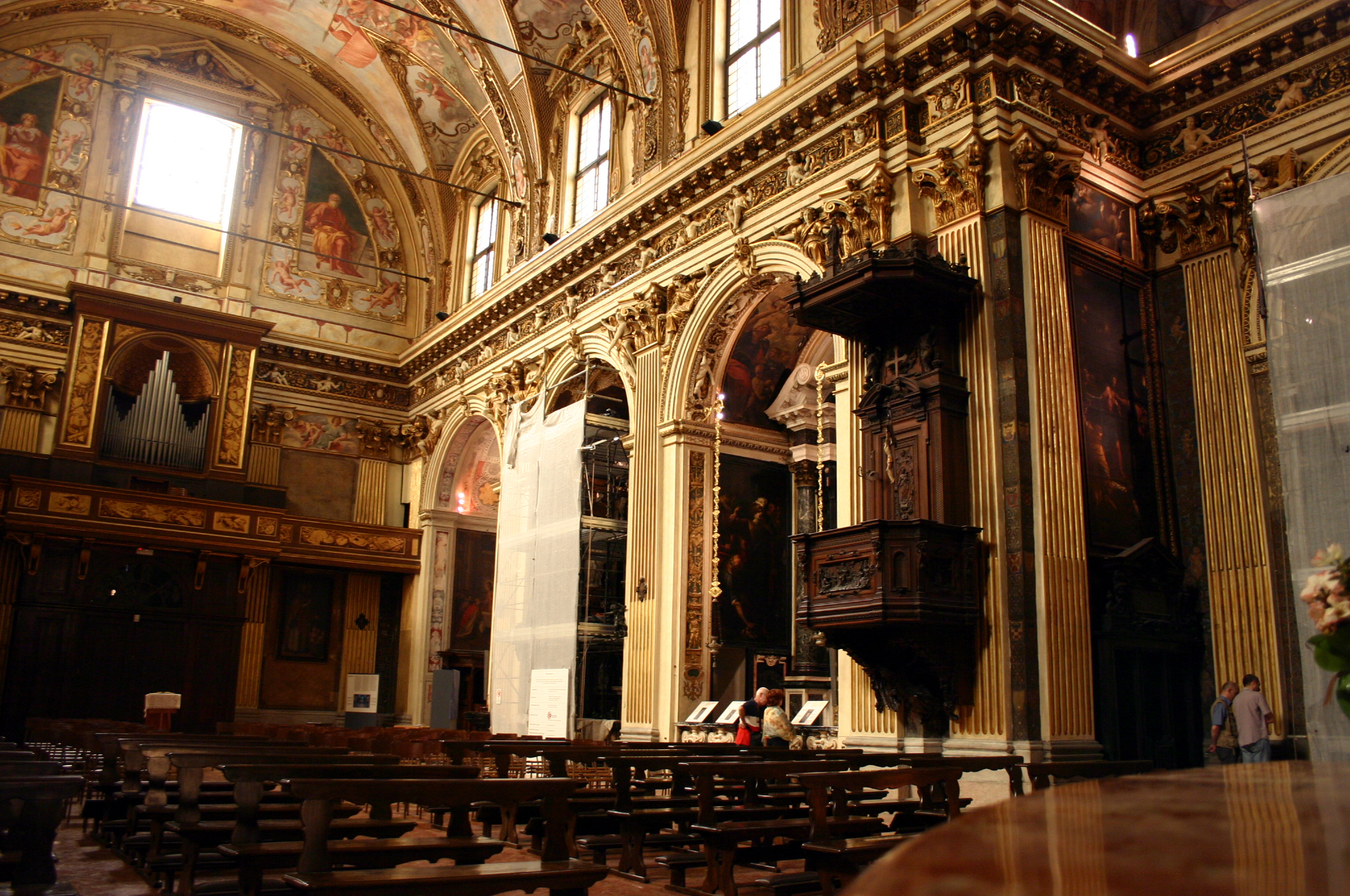
The interior of the church.

Sant'Antonio Abate is a Roman Catholic church in Milan, Italy. The church is located on a street running parallel to Via Festa del Perdono.

An older church linked to a hospital had operated at the site under the administration of the Augustinian order. The church, including the interior of the church was rebuilt in 1582 in Mannerist style. The current appearance of the church is the work of Francesco Maria Richini, who completed the commission in 1630 for the Theatine order. The Neoclassical façade was designed in 1832 by the architect Giuseppe Tazzini. The facade has statues of four saints in niches: starting on the left, Saints Gaetano (Cajetan) di Thiene, Nicholas of Flüe, Anthony Abott, and Andrea Avellino. Cajetan and Andrea Avellino were both Theatine priests.

The ceilings of the nave and transept contains frescoes (1631) by Genovese and his brother Giovanni Battista Carlone. The frescoes depict a series of frescoes regarding the history of the true cross, and events from the Old Testament, depicting a Adam and Even in Eden, a Sacrifice of Isaac, a Crossing of the Red Sea, and a Brazen Serpent. The Chapel of the Annunciation (also known as Acerbi Chapel) has a series of altarpieces depicting events from the Life of the Virgin, including an Annunciation, a Visitation, and a Rest in Egypt commissioned in 1609 and painted by Giulio Cesare Procaccini (1574-1625). The chapel of St Cajetan has a Resurrected Christ (main altarpiece, 1610) by Giovanni Battista Crespi (il Cerano). The marble sculptural decorations, including a Dead Christ below the altar and a bas-relief were completed by Giuseppe Rusnati. The chapel of the Ascension has a Adoration of the Magi by Pier Francesco Mazzucchelli.
