= Teatro Carlo Felice =

Opera house in Genoa, Italy

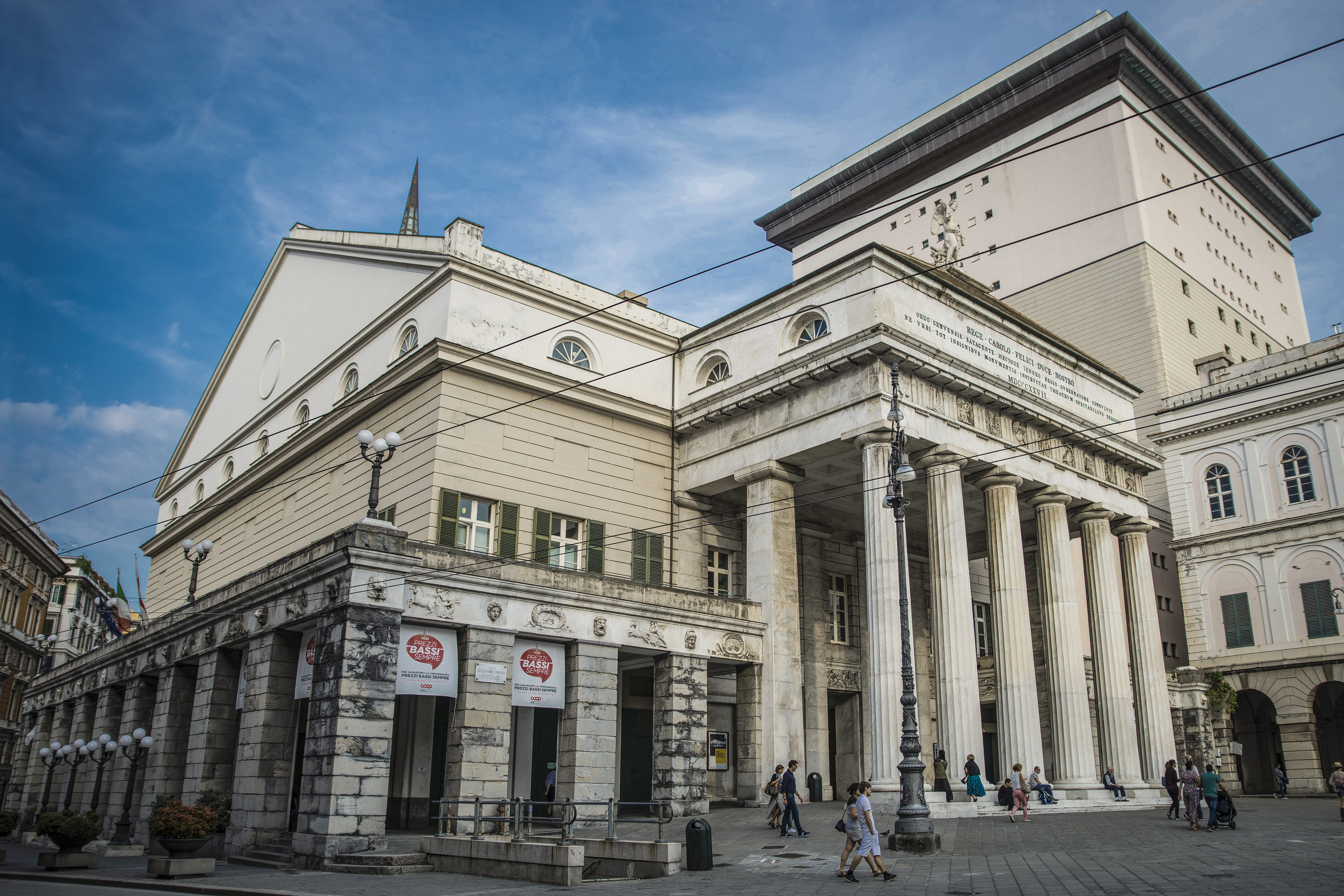
- Teatro Carlo Felice on the side of Piazza De Ferrari
- Interactive map of Teatro Carlo Felice
- Address: Passo Eugenio Montale, 4 Genoa; Italy
- Coordinates: 44.408°N 8.935°E
- Capacity: 2000 (hall), 200 (auditorium)

Construction
- Opened: 1828
- Architects: Carlo Barabino (original building); Aldo Rossi (reconstruction)

Website
- www.carlofelicegenova.it

The Teatro Carlo Felice is the principal opera house of Genoa, Italy, used for performances of opera, ballet, orchestral music, and recitals. It is located on the side of Piazza De Ferrari.

== History ==
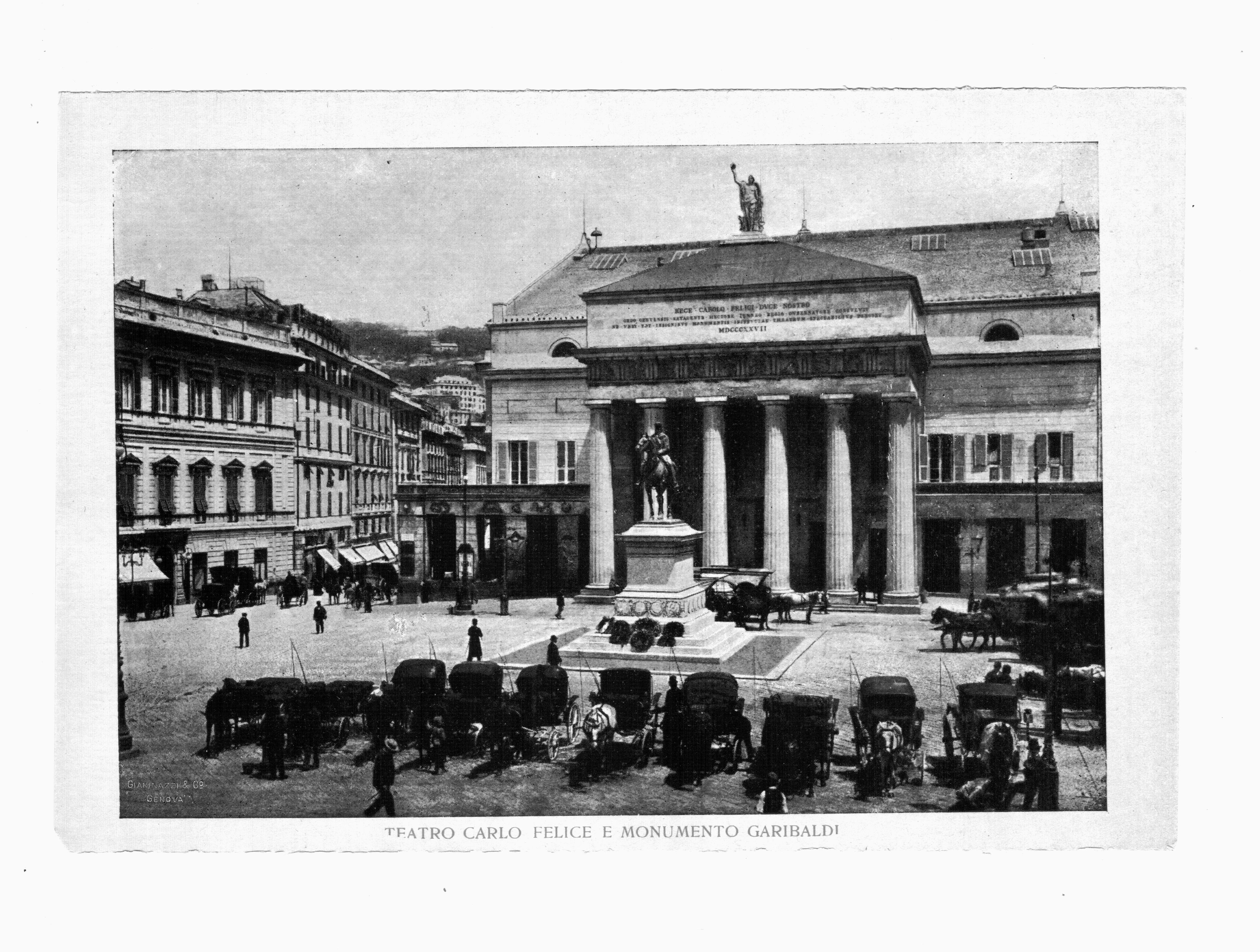
One of the earliest images of the theater

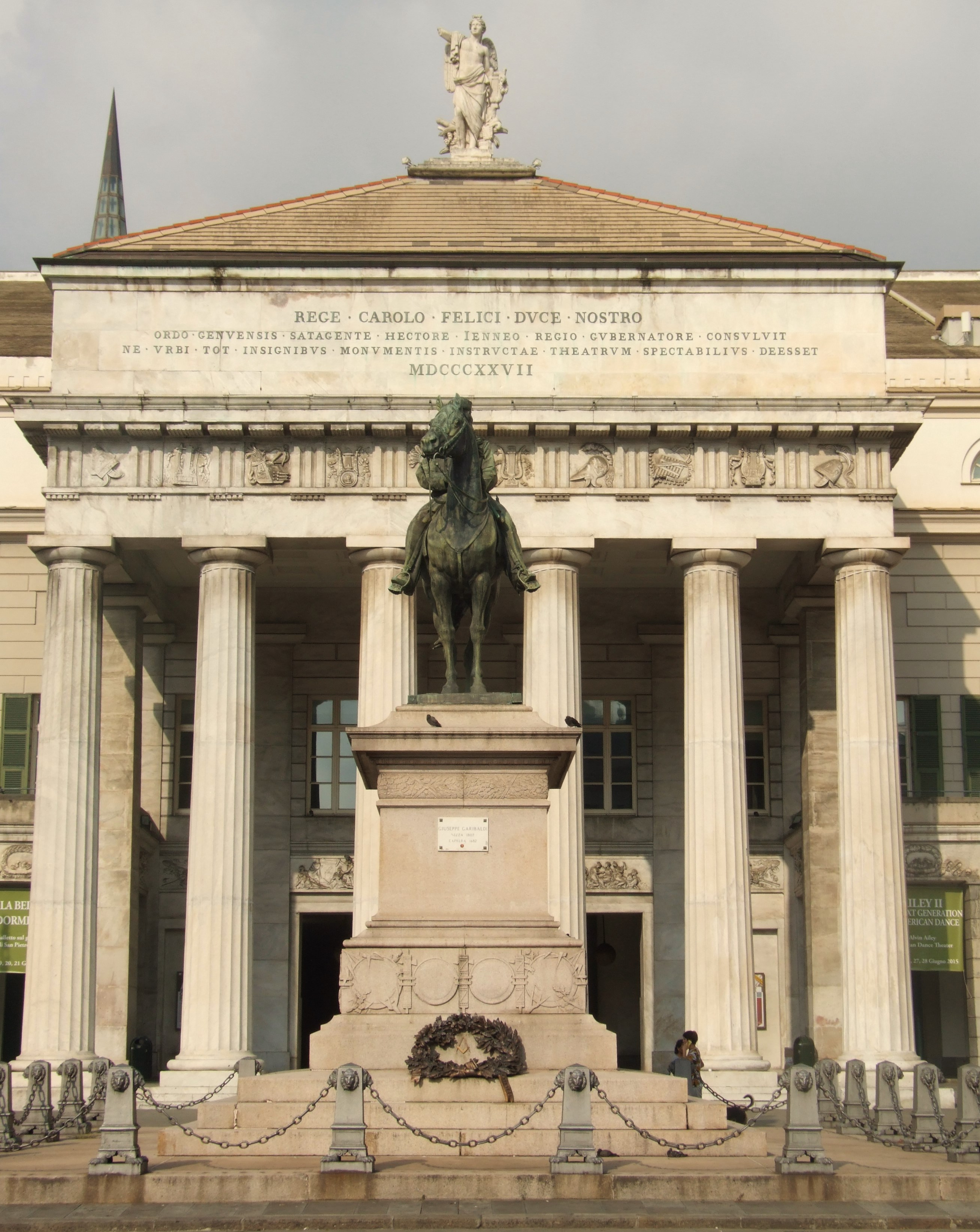
Statue of Giuseppe Garibaldi in front of the theatre

The hall is named for King Carlo Felice, and dates from 24 December 1824, when the Most Excellent Department of Theatres was established. On 31 January 1825, local architect Carlo Barabino submitted his design for the opera house which was to be built on the site of the church of San Domenico. The Dominican friars were moved elsewhere without delay or ceremony, and the first stone of the new building was laid on 19 March 1826.

The inaugural performance of Bellini's Bianca e Fernando took place on 7 April 1828, even though the structure and decoration were not quite finished. The auditorium accommodated an audience of about 2,500 in five tiers (each with 33 boxes), a gallery above, and standing room in the orchestra pit. The acoustics were considered among the best of the time. In 1829 the Scuola Gratuita di Canto (now the Genoa Conservatory) was established to train singers for opera performance at the theatre.

For nearly forty years from 1853, Verdi spent the winter in Genoa, but he had few strong professional ties with the Teatro Carlo Felice. In 1892, Genoa commemorated the 400th anniversary of Columbus' discovery of America and to celebrate the occasion the Carlo Felice was renovated and redecorated at a cost of 420,000 lire (nearly £17,000). Verdi was approached to compose a suitable opera, but he declined the honour, making the excuse that he was too old. Instead, Alberto Franchetti's opera Cristoforo Colombo premiered at the Carlo Felice on 6 October 1892.

The hall was altered many times in the years 1859–1934, and remained remarkably unscathed by war until 9 February 1941 when, during Operation Grog, a shell fired by a British warship hit the roof, leaving a large hole open to the sky and destroying the ceiling of the auditorium which had been a unique example of 19th-century rococo extravagance, its main feature being a wide circle of angels, cherubs and other winged creatures in brightly painted high relief.

Further damage was sustained during the aerial bombing of Genoa. On 5 August 1943 incendiary bombs started a backstage fire which destroyed all scenery and wooden fittings, but did not reach the main auditorium. Additional damage was caused by looters who stripped the back of the theatre of every possible scrap of metal they could find. Finally, an air raid in September 1944 caused the destruction of the front of the theatre leaving virtually only the outside walls and the corridors behind the tiers of boxes standing. What had been the most richly beautiful of opera houses had become a skeleton of bare walls and roofless porticos.

After the war opera seasons were held for over forty years in an emergency venue, at the Cinema Teatro Margherita, later transformed into a department store

Reconstruction plans began immediately after the war's close. The first design by Paolo Antonio Chessa (1951) was rejected; the second by Carlo Scarpa was approved in 1977 but brought to a halt by his untimely death. Aldo Rossi ultimately provided today's design, in which portions of the original facade have been recreated but the interior is entirely modern. The hall officially reopened in June 1991, with a main hall holding up to 2,000 seats and a smaller auditorium holding up to 200 seats.

The theatre is the main location of the concert seasons of Giovine Orchestra Genovese, a concert society founded in Genoa in 1912.

== Gallery ==
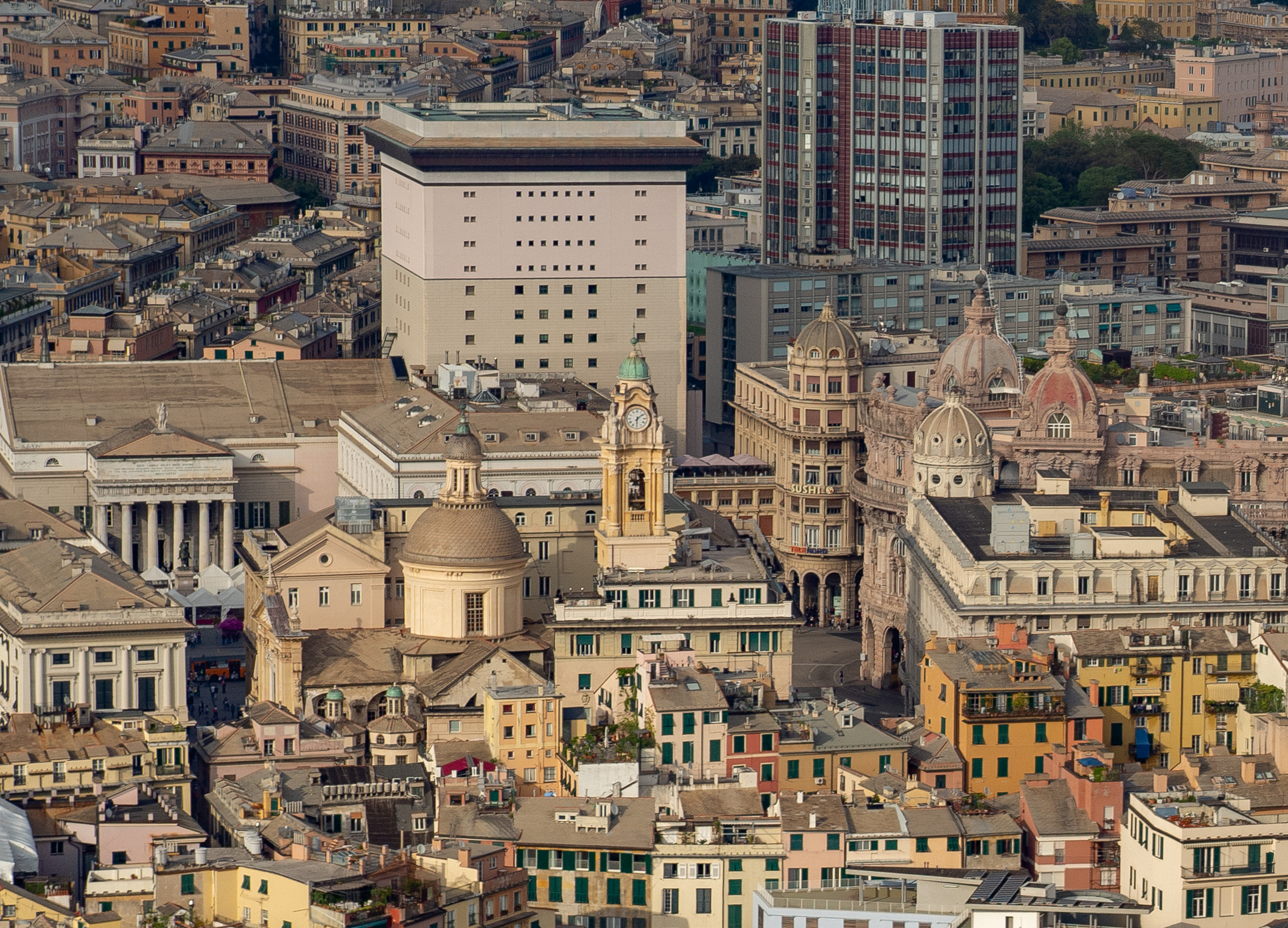
Aerial view of the theatre and its surroundings

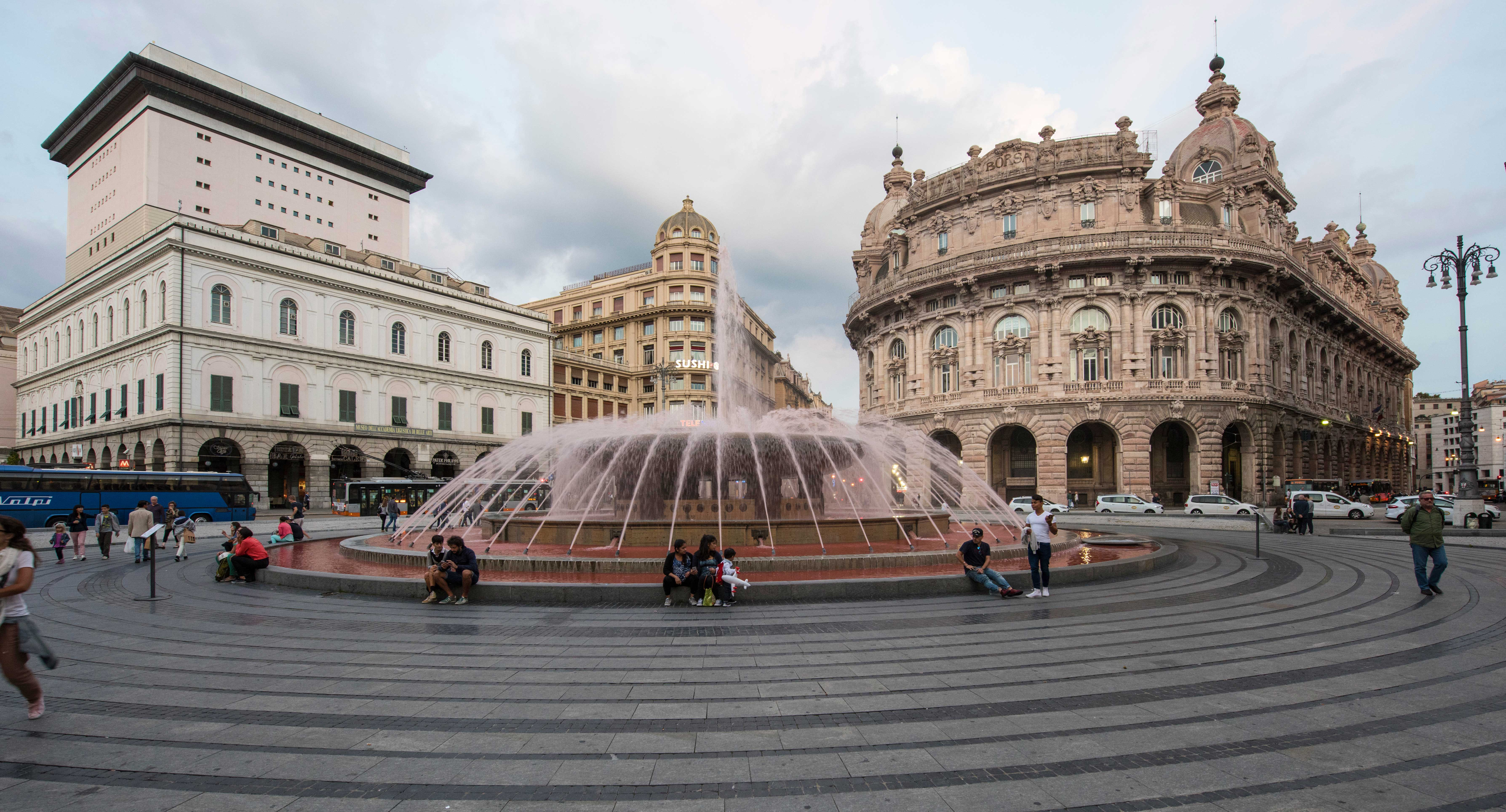
The theatre in the setting of Piazza Ferrari

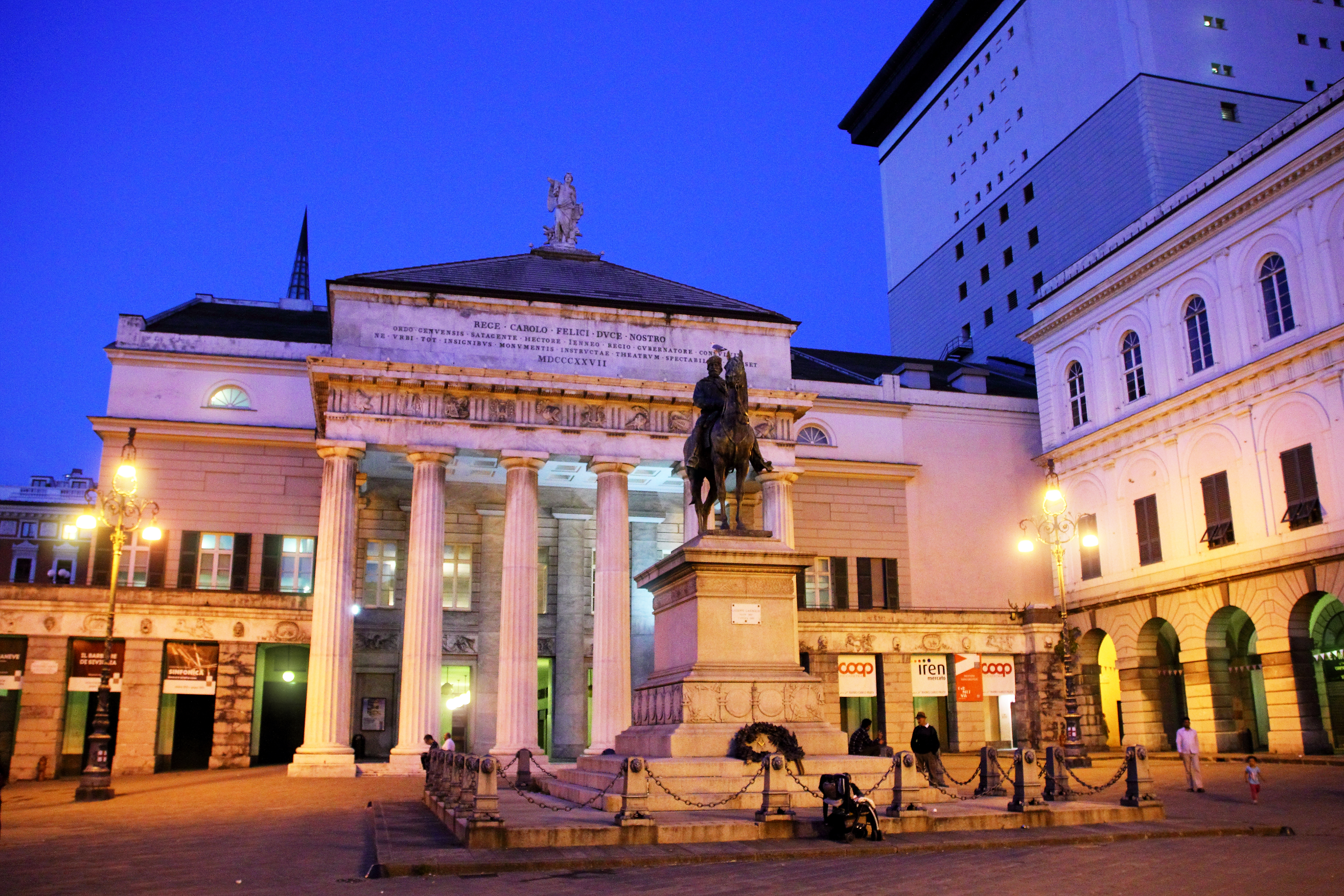
The theatre's facade in the evening

== See also ==
- Music of Liguria
