= Sanctuary of Nostra Signora della Misericordia =

Church and surrounding buildings in northern Italy

Coordinates: 44°20′40.75″N 8°26′02.93″E

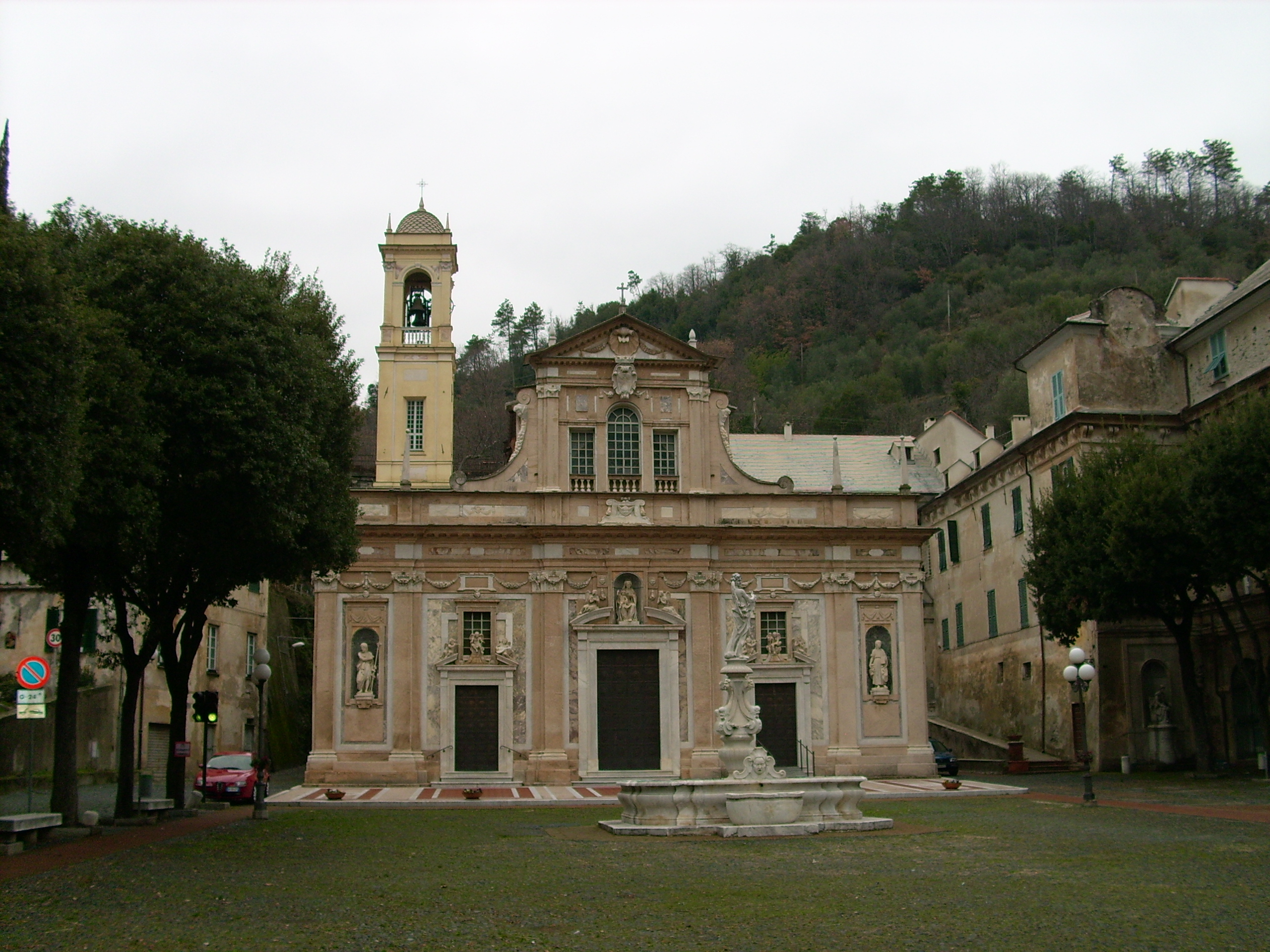
Sanctuary of Savona

The Sanctuary of Nostra Signora della Misericordia is a church and surrounding buildings located some six kilometers from the center of Savona, Liguria, northern Italy.

It is built on the site commemorating the apparition of the Virgin Mary to the shepherd and officially blessed Antonio Botta (18 March 1536). She appeared to the shepherd during a time of war between Savona and Genoa, and had the message inviting both parties to exercise "Misericordia e non Giustizia" ("Mercy and not Justice").

The church is located about 6 kilometers from the center of the city. The present Renaissance church was designed by Pace Antonio Sormano in 1536–1540. The Baroque facade was designed and built by Taddeo Carlone in 1609–1611. The interior is highly decorated by prominent architects and artists. The buildings surrounding the church became a hospice and orphanage.

The main altar is attributed to the studio of Francesco Maria Schiaffino. The cupola frescoes are by Bernardo Castello.

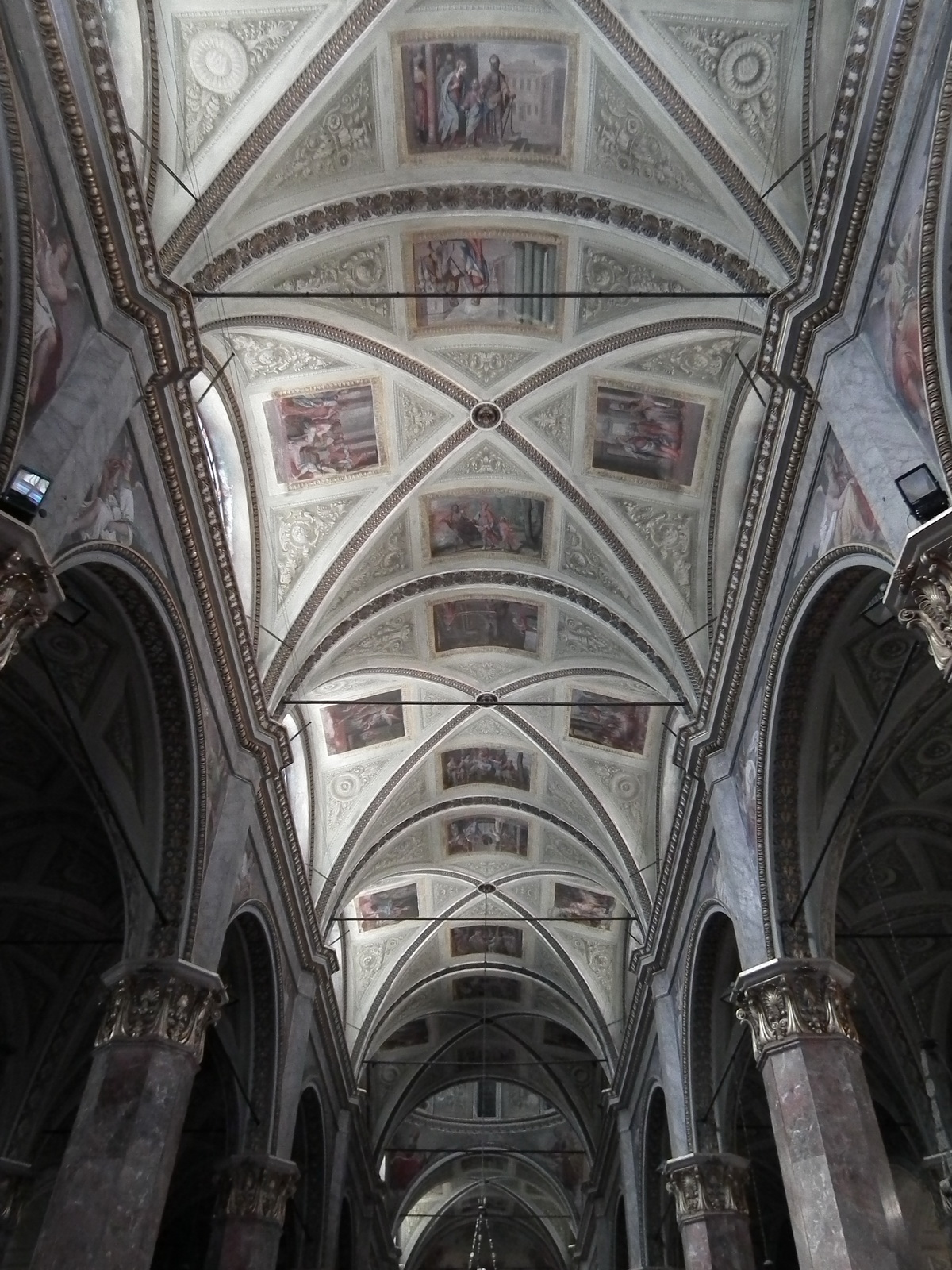
Cupola frescoes

The four pinnacles were decorated by the painter Narducci. The vault of the nave was decorated by Narducci, Riva, Giuseppe Ghislandi, and the stuccoist Castori.

The left aisle and chapels contain two altarpieces, a Madonna della Neve (1st chapel) and a Nativity (3rd chapel) by Bernardo Castello. The second chapel has a marble relief by Gianlorenzo Bernini. The third chapel has a marble relief of the Annunciation by Andrea Semino.

The right aisle contains an altarpiece of the Immaculate Conception by Paolo Gerolamo Brusco (1742-1820), a Nativity by Orazio Borgianni (1578-1616), a Presentation of Mary at the Temple by Domenichino. The Crucifix at the end of the aisle is by Giovanni Battista Paggi (1554-1627).

The chorus has a magnificently designed intarsio or wood inlay panels by Vincenzo e Giuseppe Garassino, completed in the 18th century. The central panel reproduces a painting by Giuseppe Agostino Ratti. The apse angel frescoes were completed in an antique fashion by Eso Peluzzi in 1928. The crypt statue of the virgin is by Pietro Orsolino.
