= Carlo Barabino =

Italian architect

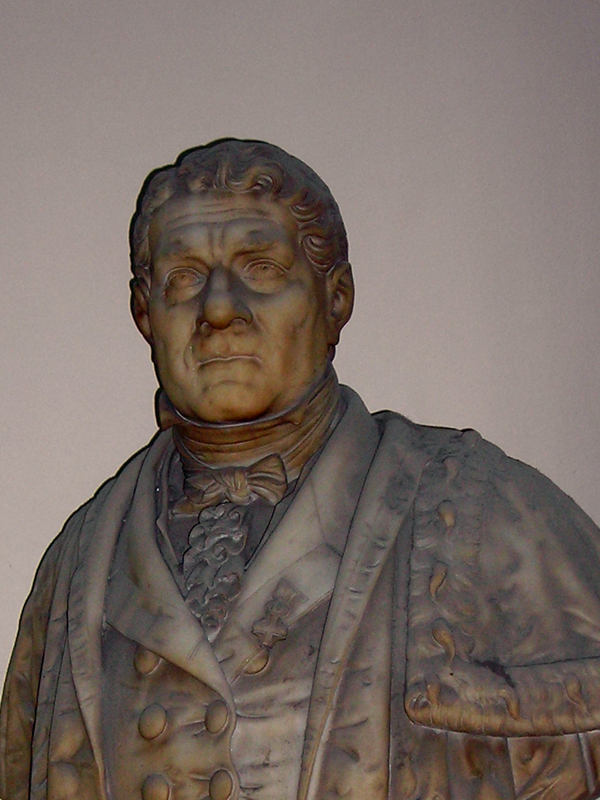
- Carlo Barabino
- Born: Carlo Francesco Barabino; February 11, 1768; Genoa, Republic of Genoa
- Died: September 3, 1835 (aged 67); Genoa, Kingdom of Sardinia
- Known for: Architecture
- Notable work: Teatro Carlo Felice; Palazzo Dell'Accademia; Basilica della Santissima Annunziata del Vastato
- Movement: Neoclassicism

Carlo Barabino (February 11, 1768 – September 3, 1835) was a prominent Italian architect of the Neoclassic period, active mainly in his native Genoa.

== Biography ==
=== Early life and education ===
Carlo Barabino was born in Genoa on February 11, 1768. He first studied in Genoa, from 1785, at the Accademia Ligustica and then in Rome, from 1788, under Giuseppe Barberi; he received prizes in the competitions of the Accademia di San Luca (1789) and the Accademia Parmense (1792).

His drawings (Genoa, Palazzo Rosso) show that he was strongly influenced on the one hand by Giovanni Battista Piranesi and the architecture of antiquity, and on the other by the architecture parlante of the French Enlightenment and in particular the more decorative tendencies of Charles de Wailly. Barabino was able to use these disparate influences in the period of renewed civic confidence in Genoa after the departure of the French in 1815 and the subsequent cession of the city to the House of Savoy.

=== Early career ===
Although Barabino returned to Genoa in 1793, the first part of his career was occupied largely with competitions and imaginary projects: the competition (1795) for the Molo di Genova, Genoa, a monument to Christopher Columbus reminiscent of the work of Étienne-Louis Boullée; a triumphal arch (1805) in Genoa for the reception of Napoleon; and a project (1807) for La Madeleine, Paris, which had a severe temple front surmounted by a structure based on the Mausoleum at Halicarnassus.

In 1801 he was invited to Milan by the Cisalpine Republic to be a judge, together with Giacomo Albertolli and Giuseppe Maria Soli (1747–1823), in the competition for the Foro Bonaparte, a new centre to be developed around the old castle. Barabino himself suggested adapting the castle as a barracks, and he designed (1801) a severe Corinthian portico to be applied to the front of the refurbished ramparts. Among the works of Barabino executed during this period were the façade of the Casa Ravara, Pontedecimo; the Casa Massuccone (1796), Genoa, in which the presence of the orders was so reduced as to make the building almost astylar; the decoration of the piano nobile of the Palazzo Negrone (now Cavi), Piazza Fontane Marose, Genoa, in a late 18th-century French manner; and the altar (1796; removed 1904 to the Piazza Alimonda) of the church of the Rimedio, Via Giulia, Genoa.

In 1795 he became Accademico di Merito of the Accademia Ligustica and assistant to the architect of the Comune, Claudio Storace, succeeding him in 1797, but he was replaced by Gaetano Cantoni and Andrea Emmanuele Tagliafichi (1729–1811) the following year. During this period Barabino designed the Lavatorio (1797), Via Madre de Dio (subsequently re-erected in the Giardini Baltimora), Genoa. In 1802 he became director of the School of Architecture of the Accademia Ligustica.

=== Mature work ===
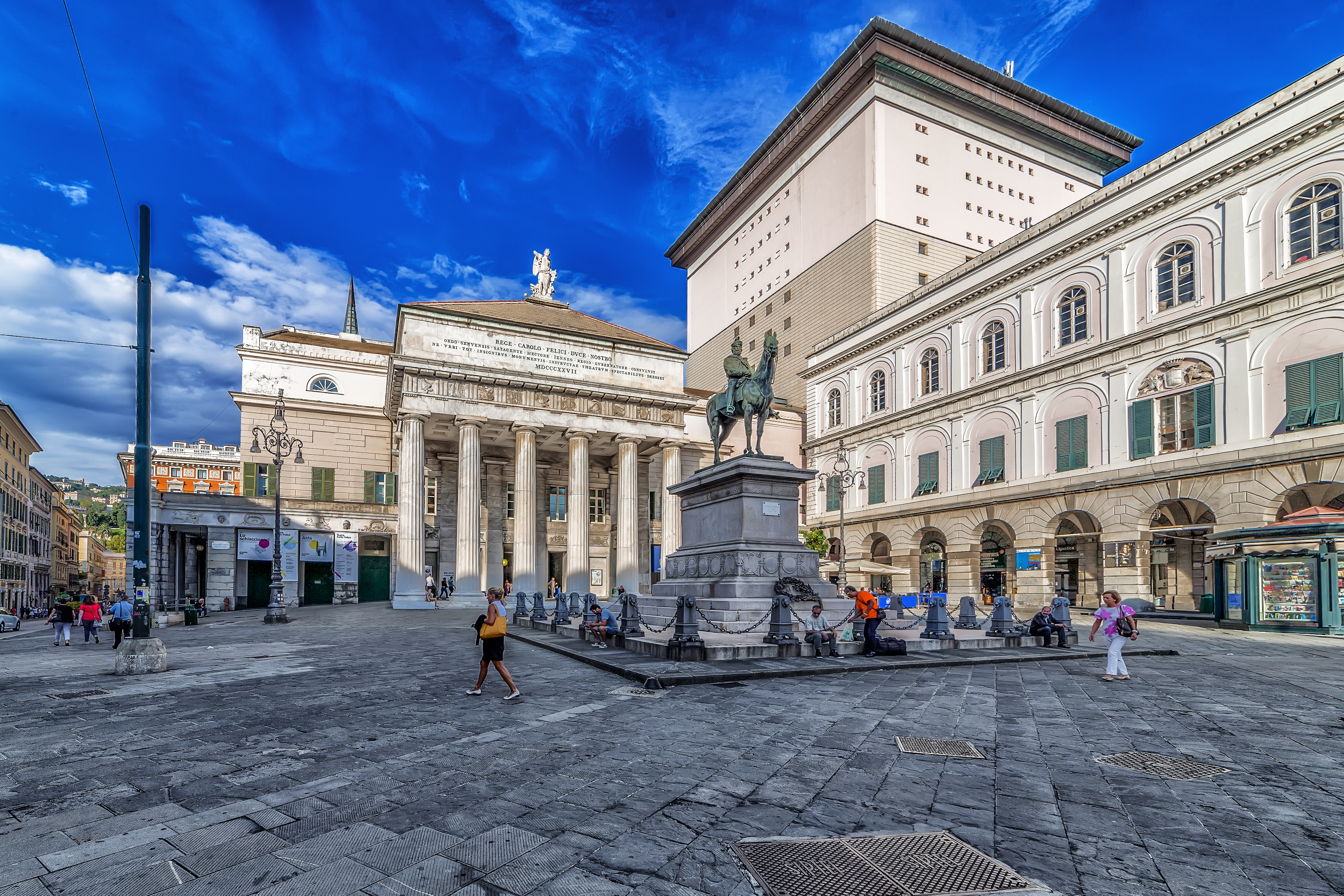
Teatro Carlo Felice

It was only after 1818 that Barabino started his principal activities, when he was appointed architect of the city of Genoa by the Corpo Decurionale. His major works date from 1825: the establishment of the Piazza de Ferrari with the Teatro Carlo Felice (1826–7), the Palazzo dell’Accademia Ligustica e Biblioteca (1826–7), and a series of urban improvements.

Following its regularization, the Piazza de Ferrari, on which Barabino had started work during the French occupation, became after 1815 the cultural centre of Genoa. The new Palazzo dell’Accademia was an austere three-storey building with an arcaded ground floor, the interior of which was dominated by a magnificent staircase cleverly designed to accommodate the steep site. The Teatro Carlo Felice (1826–7) was resolutely Neoclassical, with a strongly horizontally rusticated main block contrasting with a prominent portico; an arcade continued that of the adjacent Palazzo dell’Accademia. Curiously, the portico, consisting of a Greek Doric order surmounted by an attic and pyramidal roof with a giant statue of Harmony by Giuseppe Gaggini, was not the main entrance, which was on the adjacent Via Carlo Felice, but was designed to terminate visually the angle of the Piazza de Ferrari formed by the Palazzo dell’Accademia. This peculiarity arose due to the restricted depth of the site, which required the main axis of salon, foyer, and auditorium – of conventional horseshoe shape – to be parallel to the main façade.

Barabino’s urban improvements include the opening of the Via Carlo Felice (1825–8; now Via 25 Aprile), cut through the medieval fabric of the city to link the Piazza de Ferrari with the Piazza Fontane Marose; the regularization of the Via Giulia (now Via 20 Settembre); and several residential areas outside the medieval city. He proposed broad streets – the Via Assarotti, Via Caffaro and Via Corsica, executed later (1856) – lined with palaces and with dignified apartment blocks in the Parisian manner, and the Piazza Colombo and the gardens of L’Acquasola (1821–37). He also made drawings for improvements to the seafront.

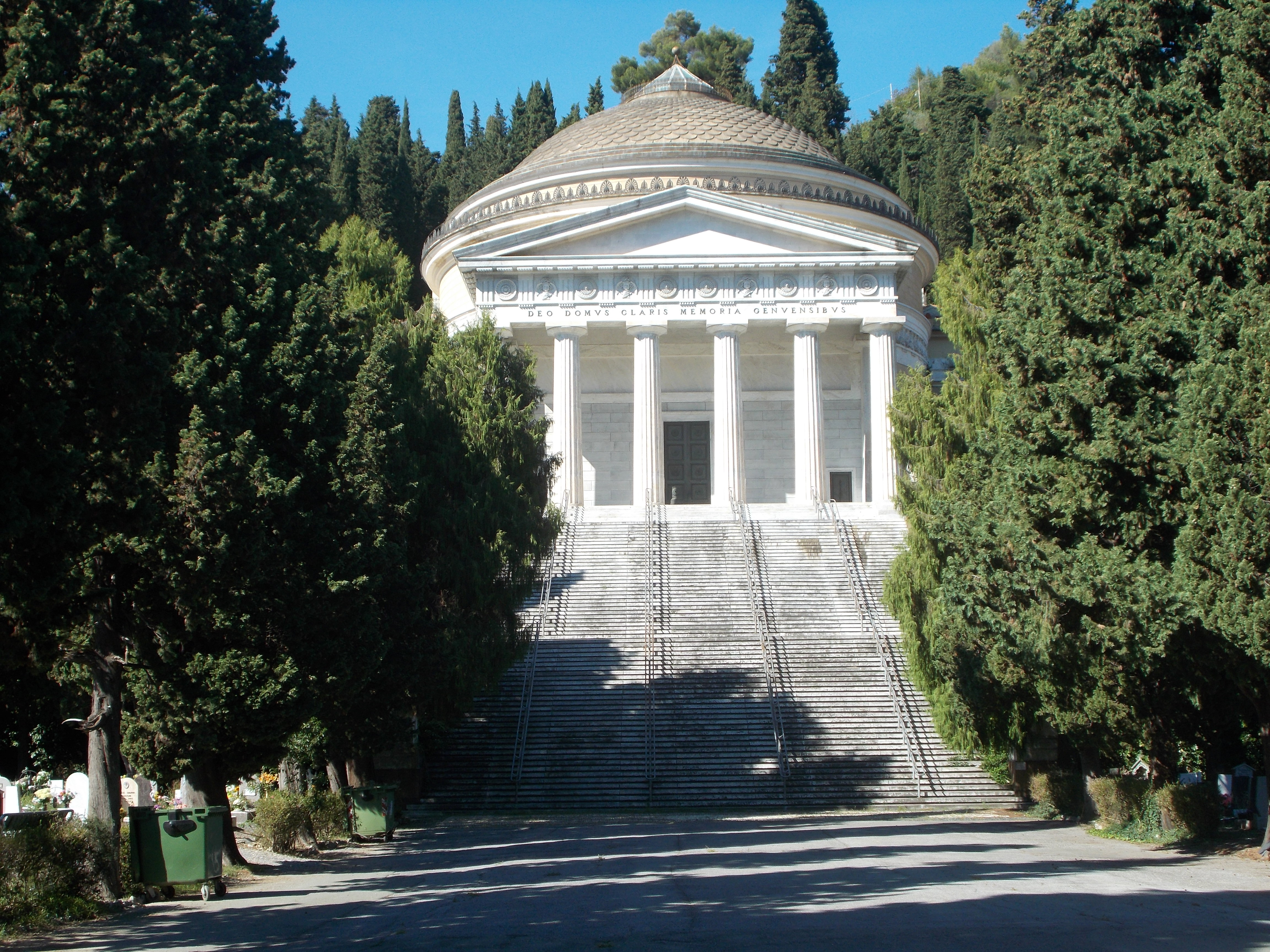
The Pantheon of the Monumental Cemetery of Staglieno

Barabino undertook several ecclesiastical works in Genoa, including the addition of a pilastered temple front (1819–21) to San Siro, and the design of the oratory of the Rosario (1824–6) in the Salita San Francesco di Paola, a small version of the Pantheon in Rome. He added a new façade (1834), incorporating a severe Greek temple front, to the unfinished Baroque church of the Basilica della Santissima Annunziata del Vastato.

Barabino also established the plan for the Monumental Cemetery of Staglieno in Genoa. The original project was approved in 1835. However, Barabino died the same year as a result of the cholera epidemic that struck the city and the project passed to his assistant and pupil Giovanni Battista Resasco (1798–1871).

== Bibliography ==
- Ricci, Corrado (1911). Art in Northern Italy. New York: Charles Scribner's Sons. p. 258.
- Venditti, Arnaldo (1963). "BARABINO, Carlo Francesco". Dizionario Biografico degli Italiani (in Italian). Vol. 5: Bacca–Baratta. Rome: Istituto dell'Enciclopedia Italiana. OCLC 883370.
- Curl, James Stevens (1999). Oxford Dictionary of Architecture and Landscape Architecture (2 ed.). Oxford University Press. ISBN 978-0-19-860678-9.
- Fera, Stefano; Spesso, Marco (2010). Carlo Francesco Barabino. (1768-1835) architettura per Genova. Genoa: COEDIT.
