= Giovanni Bernardo Carlone =

Italian painter

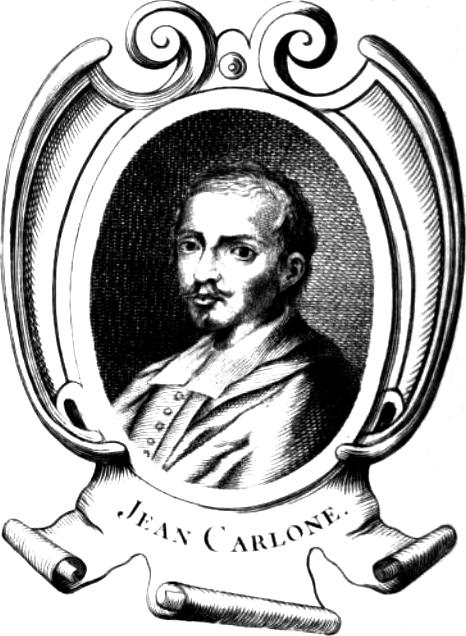
Portrait of Giovanni Bernardo Carlone, from Antoine-Joseph Dézallier d'Argenville's Abrégé de la Vie des plus Fameux Peintres (Summary of the Life of the Most Famous Painters), 1745.

Giovanni Bernardo Carlone (1590–1630) was an Italian painter of the late-Mannerist and early-Baroque periods.

He was born in Genoa. He was the son of Taddeo Carlone, a sculptor and historical painter, who placed him under the tuition of Pietro Sorri, and he afterwards frequented the school of Domenico Passignano at Florence. He returned to Genoa was much employed there and at Rome and Florence. He assisted his younger brother, Giovanni Battista Carlone in the immense fresco work in the Basilica della Santissima Annunziata del Vastato at Genoa, and was invited to Milan to paint the ceiling of the church of the Theatines, which he did not live to finish. It was completed by his brother. He died at Milan.

Most of his works are in Genoa and in Liguria.

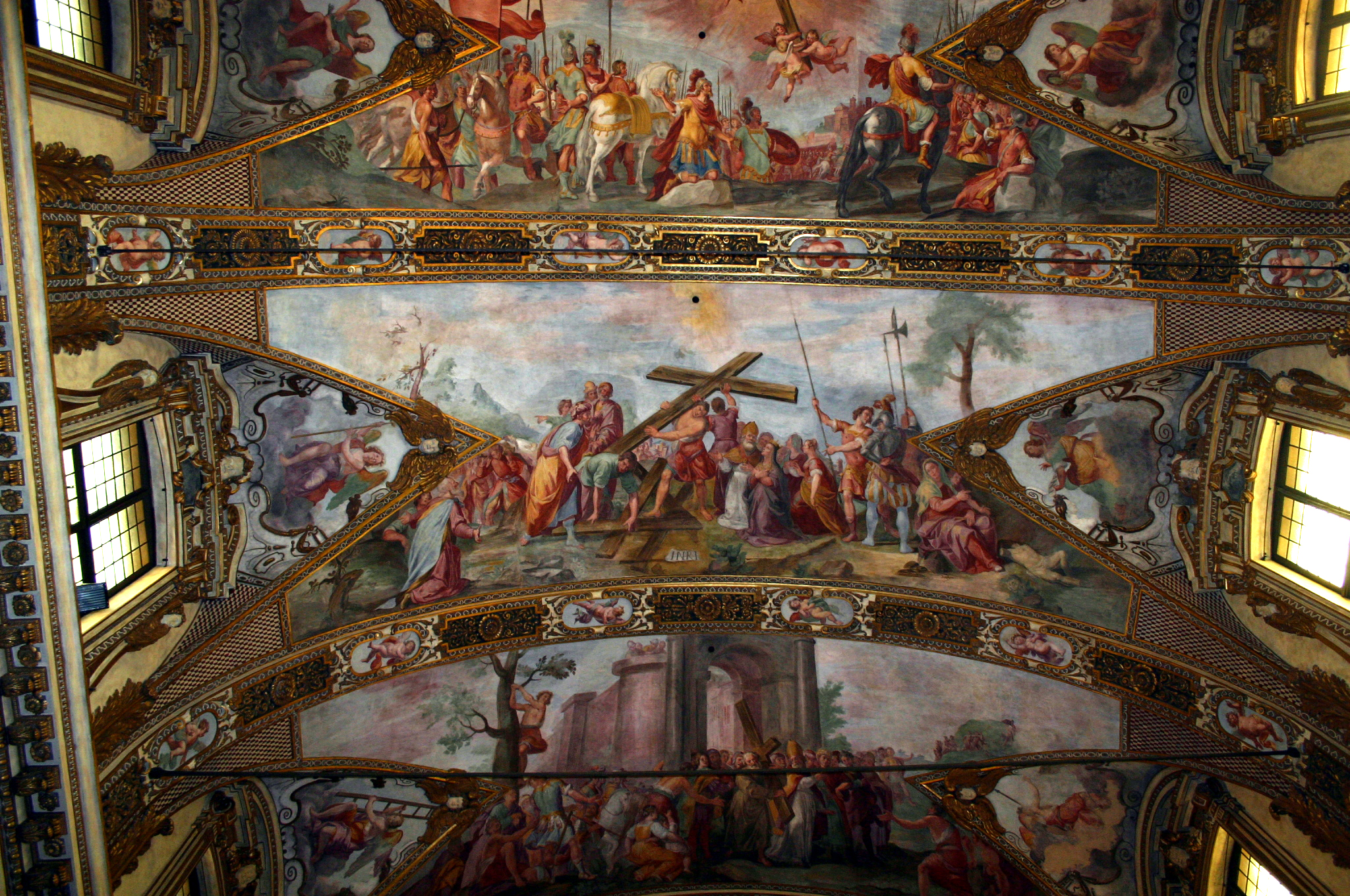
Giovanni Bernardo Carlone, Stories of the Holy Cross, fresco on the ceiling of Sant'Antonio Abate church in Milan, Italy
