= Giovanni Battista Carlone =

Italian painter (1603–1684)

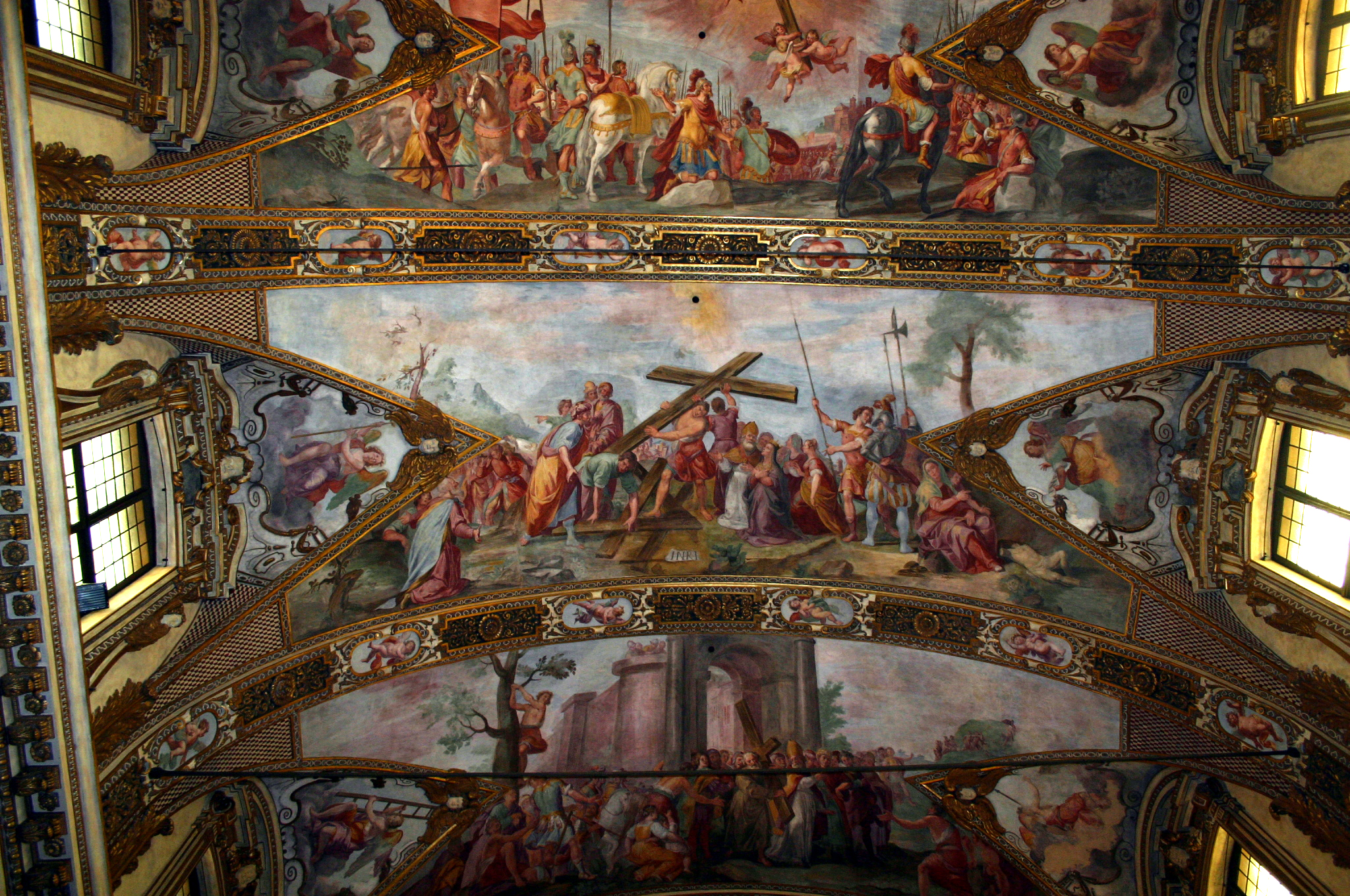
Giovanni Battista Carlone, Stories of the Holy Cross, fresco on the ceiling of Sant'Antonio Abate church, Milan.

Giovanni Battista Carlone (1603–1684) was an Italian Baroque painter, active mainly in Genoa. He belonged to a family of artists of Lombard origin and was a prolific painter of frescoes and altarpieces; his major works include the fresco cycles in the churches of San Siro and the Annunziata del Vastato in Genoa.

== Biography ==
Carlone was born and died in Genoa. He came from a family of artists: his father Taddeo, uncle, and cousins were sculptors, and his older brother Giovanni Bernardo Carlone was a painter, trained in Rome and married to the daughter of Bernardo Castello. Giovanni Bernardo, however, died at age 40.

Giovanni Battista may have had some training under Domenico Passignano. Following the contemporary Raffaele Soprani and Carlo Giuseppe Ratti, he had a similar education to that of his brother, including periods in Florence and Rome. An affinity with Domenico Fiasella drew him towards naturalism and story-telling. However, his style diverges significantly from his elder brother's and sits outside the confines of the academy. Rather, he can be associated with Bernardo Strozzi, Ansaldo, Assereto and de Ferrari and their storytelling approach to painting and rich use of colour. Carlone produced many frescoes and oils, and his bozzetti for larger fresco cycles were frequently exceptional.

Most of his career was spent in Genoa and its surroundings. Between about 1625 and 1628 he worked with his brother on the decoration of the church of the Gesù in Genoa. After his brother's death in Milan in 1630, he was called there to complete the decoration that had been left unfinished in the Theatine church of Sant'Antonio Abate. His earliest dated work is Saint James Opening the Gates of Coimbra (1632) in the oratory of San Giacomo della Marina in Genoa, for which he also painted Saint James Led to Execution in 1646. In 1644 he painted canvases and frescoes with stories of John the Baptist in the church dedicated to the saint in Chiavari.

From 1650, and for some twenty years, he worked on the frescoes of the presbytery vault, the dome and the aisles of San Siro in Genoa, helped by his son Niccolò and with painted architecture (quadratura) by the Bolognese Paolo Brozzi. In 1655 he decorated the chapel of the Doge's Palace: the Virgin with the patron saints of the city on the vault and, on the walls, the capture of Jerusalem by Guglielmo Embriaco, the arrival in Genoa of the ashes of the Baptist and the landing of Columbus. Around 1660 he supplied panels and frescoes for the chapels of Saint John the Baptist and Saint Catherine in the Certosa di Pavia. A Martyrdom of Saint Benignus in the Albergo dei Poveri in Genoa is dated 1672.

He worked in the Annunziata del Vastato at intervals over several decades, from 1627–28, when he was still at his brother's side, until the 1660s, when he collaborated with Giulio Benso. In the middle and principal nave of the Vastato, he has represented the Adoration of the Magi; the Entrance of Christ into Jerusalem; the Resurrection; the Ascension; the Descent of the Holy Ghost; and the Assumption of the Virgin. In the same church he painted Presentation in the Temple and Christ preaching to the Pharisees.

He is last documented in 1676, when he frescoed three stories of saints in the cloister of the Dominican convent at Bosco Marengo; the Dizionario Biografico degli Italiani regards the year of his death as unknown. He married Nicoletta Scorza, who was Spanish, and they had twenty-four children. Two of their sons, Giovanni Andrea and Niccolò, became painters; a third, Giacomo, who died in 1700, was according to Ratti a priest and miniaturist.

== Works ==
- Miracolo del basilisco, crocefissione di San Pietro, conversione di San Pietro, frescoes at the vault of San Siro church, Genoa
- Miracolo del beato Salvatore da Horta - oil on canvas 280 cm × 185 cm, Basilica della Santissima Annunziata del Vastato, Genoa
- Giuseppe riconosciuto dai fratelli, Accademia Ligustica di Belle Arti, Genoa
- Adorazione dei pastori (Adoration of the Shepherds), Accademia Ligustica di Belle Arti, Genoa
- Gesù comunica santa Gertrude, Albergo dei poveri, Genoa
- Flagellazione di Santa Caterina d'Alessandria and Santa Caterina liberata dal demonio, Certosa di Pavia
- Assunzione della Vergine, Cassa di Risparmio, Genoa
- Martirio di San Lorenzo (Martyrdom of Saint Lawrence), San Lorenzo oratory, Cogoleto
- Saint Sebastian, Fondation Bemberg, Toulouse
- Frescoes of Mars and Bellona, Jupiter and Venus and Jupiter and Juno (c. 1655), Palazzo Negrone, Genoa
- Martyrdom of Saint Benignus (1672), Albergo dei Poveri, Genoa
- Musician Angels, Palazzo Bianco, Genoa
- Bacchus and Ariadne and Vulcan Surprising Mars and Venus, Pinacoteca Civica, Savona
