= Andrea Carlone =

Italian painter (1626–1697)

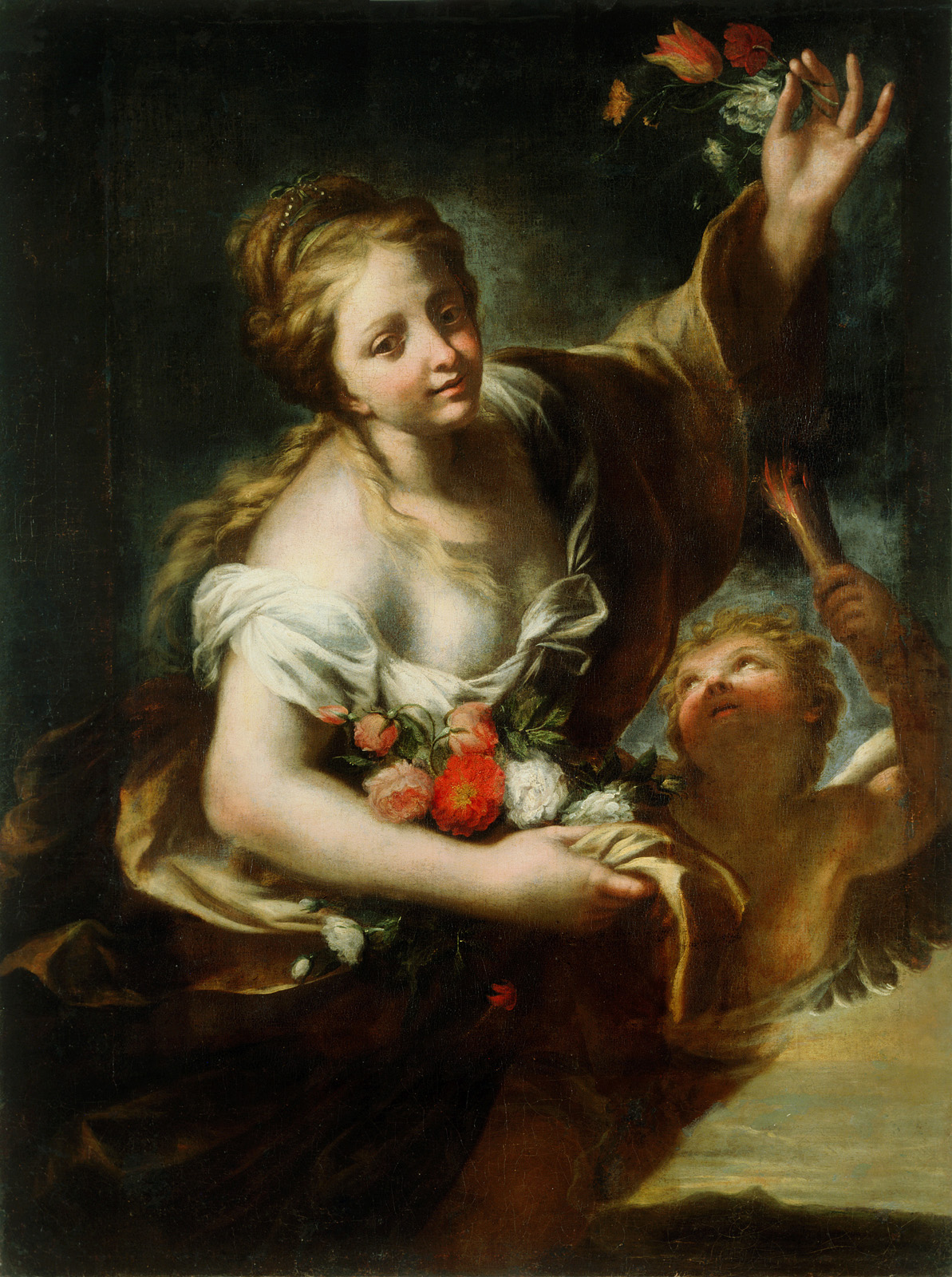
Aurora (The Dawn) by Andrea Carlone, National Gallery of Slovenia, 1678

Andrea Carlone (16 May 1626 – 4 April 1697) was an Italian painter of the Baroque period, active mainly in his natal city of Genoa.

He was the son of the painter Giovanni Battista Carlone and Niccoletta Scorza. He traveled and painted extensively through Italy. After initial work with his father, he traveled to Venice for a few years. His first works were pictures at the church of the Gesù at Perugia, and the Life of St. Felician in the church of that saint at Foligno. He went afterwards to Rome to the studio of Carlo Maratta. He married in Rome, with the sister of Perruchi, the personal secretary (Maggiordomo) for Marchese Costaguti. His brother Niccolò was also a painter.

== Works ==
- Life of St. Felician, San Feliciano (St. Felician) church, Foligno
- The Glory of St. Francis Borgia
- Aurora (The Dawn) (1678), National Gallery of Slovenia, Ljubljana
