= San Siro di Struppa =

Church building in Genoa, Italy

Coordinates: 44°27′14″N 9°0′15″E

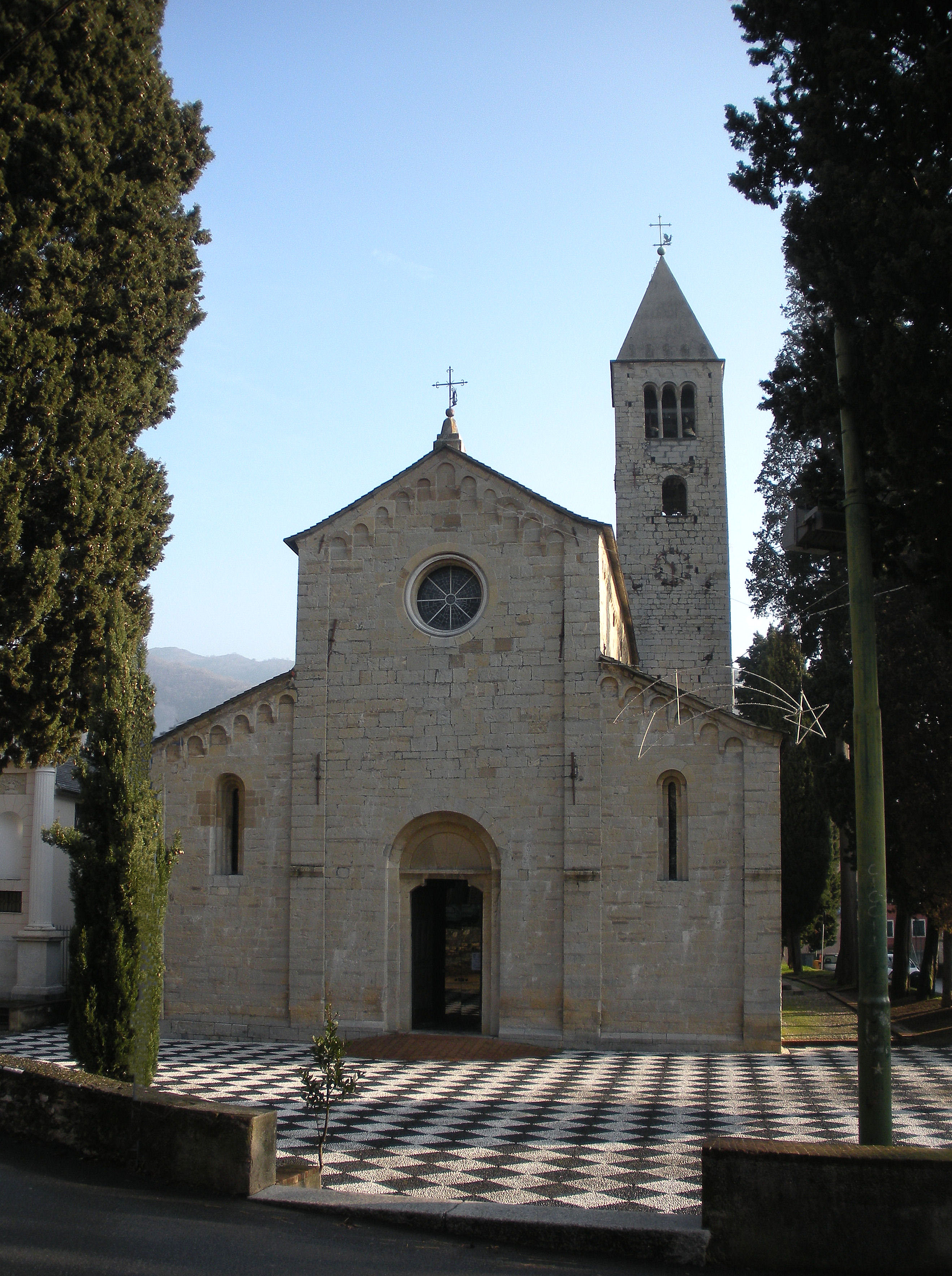
- The façade of the Basilica.

Religion
- Affiliation: Roman Catholic
- Province: Genoa

Location
- Location: Genoa, Italy
- Interactive map of San Siro di Struppa

Architecture
- Type: Church
- Style: Romanesque

San Siro di Struppa is a Roman Catholic, Romanesque-style church in Struppa, a neighborhood of Genoa, region of Liguria, Italy.

== History ==
A Benedictine abbey was founded here in the Middle Ages, entitled to St. Syrus of Genoa, who, according to the tradition, was born here. A church existed here, most likely, since the 5th century AD, but it is documented only in 955. In 1025 bishop Landulf I of Genoa gave it the Benedictines.

The church was most likely rebuilt in the 12th century, as testified by its Genoese Romanesque style. It received a series of modifications in the 16th century, in the wake of the new procedures established by the Council of Trent. Baroque elements were added in the 17th century. The Romanesque forms were restored in the 20th century.

== Overview ==
The church was built in sandstone, without external decorative elements aside from the Lombard bands of the upper edges of the walls, present on every side. The central rose window of the façade was restored in the 20th century, replacing the Baroque window. In that occasion were also restored the triple mullioned windows of the bell tower, which has a height of 32 m.

The interior has a nave and two aisles, divided by sturdy columns without decorations. The main piece of art is a polyptych of St. Syrus (1516), once attributed to Teramo Piaggio, now assigned to Pier Francesco Sacchi.

== Sources ==
- Praga, Corinna (2006). Genova fuori le mura. Genoa: Fratelli Frilli Editori. ISBN 88-7563-197-2.
