= Anna Maria Barabino =

Italian yacht racer

Anna Maria Barabino (born 17 November 1966) is an Italian yacht racer who competed in the 1992 Summer Olympics as helmsmen in the 470 class.
