= Bernardo Castello =

Italian painter (1557–1629)

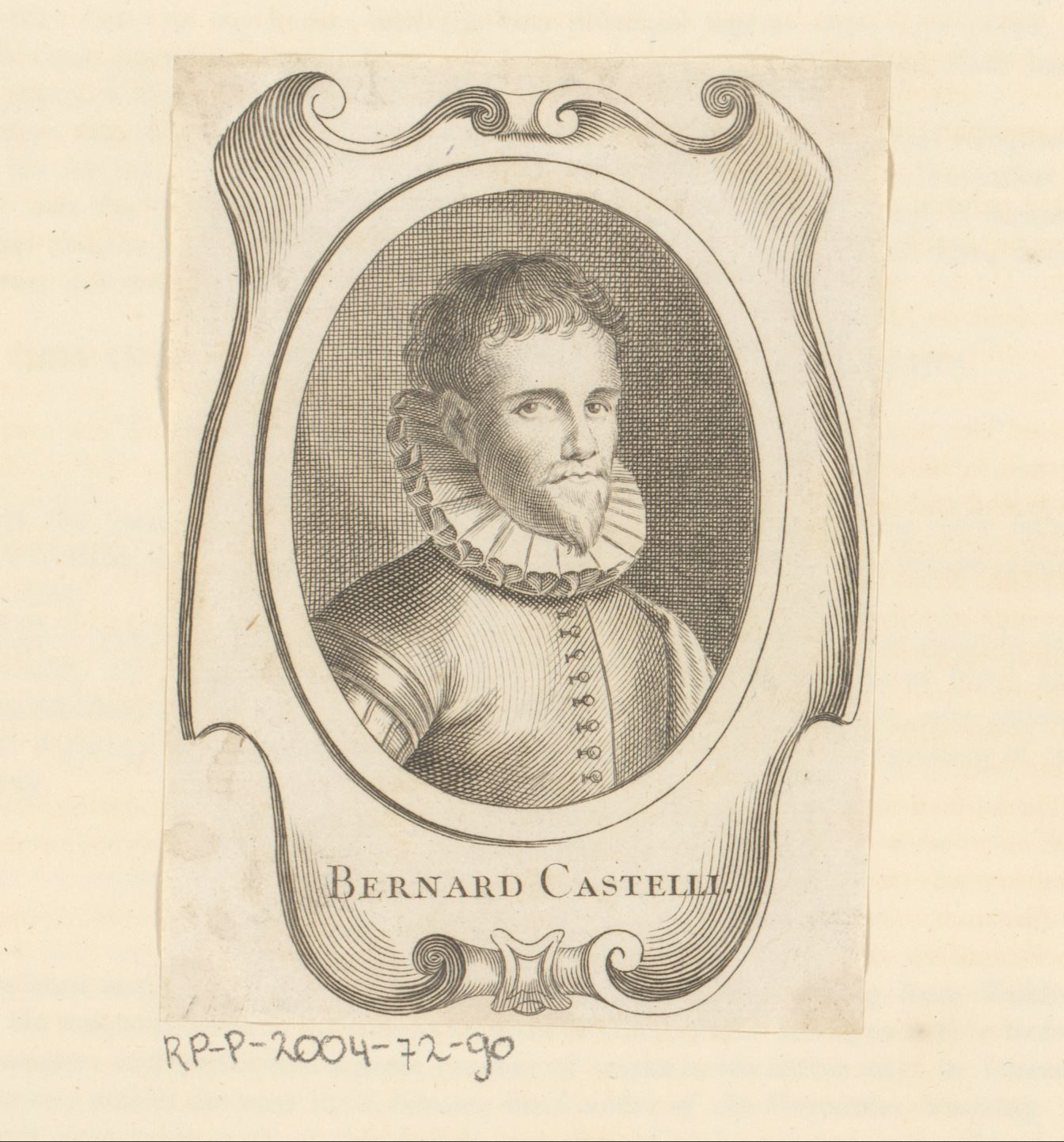
Bernardo Castello

Bernardo Castello (or Castelli) (1557–1629) was an Italian painter of the late Mannerist style, active mainly in Genoa and Liguria. He is mainly known as a portrait and historical painter.

== Biography ==
Bernardo Castello was born in San Martino d'Albaro, now a quarter of Genoa. He was apprenticed under Andrea Semino and Luca Cambiaso, then travelled throughout Italy, meeting other painters and creating his own particular style.

During his career, he painted many works and was appreciated by famous poets with whom he had friendships. Amongst these were Gabriello Chiabrera and Torquato Tasso, and Castello was the illustrator for Jerusalem Delivered by Tasso, published in 1590 (and also for a further edition, published in 1617). Some of these illustrations were engraved by Agostino Carracci.

Besides working in Genoa, Castello was employed in Rome and worked also for the Duke of Savoy, Charles Emmanuel I.

Bernardo Castello died in October 1629, aged seventy-two years, following a short illness, as he was about to go to Rome, where he had been requested to paint a picture for St. Peter's Basilica. He was buried in the church of San Martino of Albaro.

Valerio Castello was his youngest son. Valerio was only six when Bernardo died, but he went on to become one of the greatest Genoese painters of the 17th century.

== Works ==
During his long career, Bernardo Castello produced many works. The following list is not exhaustive:

- Frescoes with scenes of Jerusalem Delivered in De Franchi palace, Genoa
- Frescoes in Palazzo Spinola di Pellicceria, Genoa
- Frescoes in Imperial Palace, Genoa
- Fresco depicting “Martyrdom of St. John the Baptist” in the church of Jesus (Genoa)
- St Francis of Paola, painting in the church of Our Lady of Mount Carmel and St. Agnes (Genoa)
- Esther and Ahasuerus, painting in the church of the Saints Cosmas and Damian, Genoa
- Madonna and Child with Saints Nicholas and Magdalene, altarpiece in the church of St Mary Magdalene, Genoa
- Enthroned Madonna with St John and other Saints, painting in the church known as the “Commenda” (St. John of Pré, in Genoa)
- Saints Roch, Nazarius and Celsus, Catherine of Siena and Sebastian, altarpiece in the Oratory of St Celsus (Genoa-Sturla)
- Two paintings which depict “Deposition” and “Madonna with Child and saints”, in the church of San Bartolomeo della Certosa (Genoa-Rivarolo).
- Martyrdom of St Peter of Verona (1597), painting and frescoes on the ceiling of the church of Santa Maria di Castello in Genoa.
- St Bernard in the chair between St Erasmus and St Nicholas painting in the oratory of St Bernard in Santa Margherita Ligure (discovered in 2007)
- Virgin of the Rosary, altarpiece in the shrine of Our Lady of the Rose in Santa Margherita Ligure
- Crucifix with the saints Prosper and Catherine of Alexandria, altarpiece in the church of Santa Maria Assunta (Camogli)
- Histories of the Virgin, frescoes on ceiling and cupola of the Sanctuary of Nostra Signora della Misericordia, near Savona
- Madonna and Child with Angels and “Adoration of the Shepherds", paintings in the same shrine
- Assumption of the Virgin, painting in the church of St. Catherine (Rossiglione)
- St John the Baptist, St Anthony the abbot and Mary Magdalenepainting in the church of St. George, Busalla
- Annunciation, altarpiece in the church of St George (Sarissola, quarter of Busalla).
- Martyrdom of St Lawrence, altarpiece in the church of San Lorenzo of Torbi, Ceranesi
- Stoning of Saint Stephen the Protomartyr, painting in the church of San Giorgio dei Genovesi, Palermo

== Sources ==
- Chisholm, Hugh, ed. (1911). "Castello, Bernardo" . Encyclopædia Britannica. Vol. 5 (11th ed.). Cambridge University Press. pp. 471–472.
- Soprani, Raffaello (1769). Carlo Giuseppe Ratti (ed.). Delle vite de' pittori, scultori, ed architetti genovesi. Genoa: Stamperia Casamara. pp. 150–163. "Genovesi Raffaello Soprani."
