= Taddeo Carlone =

Swiss-Italian sculptor and architect

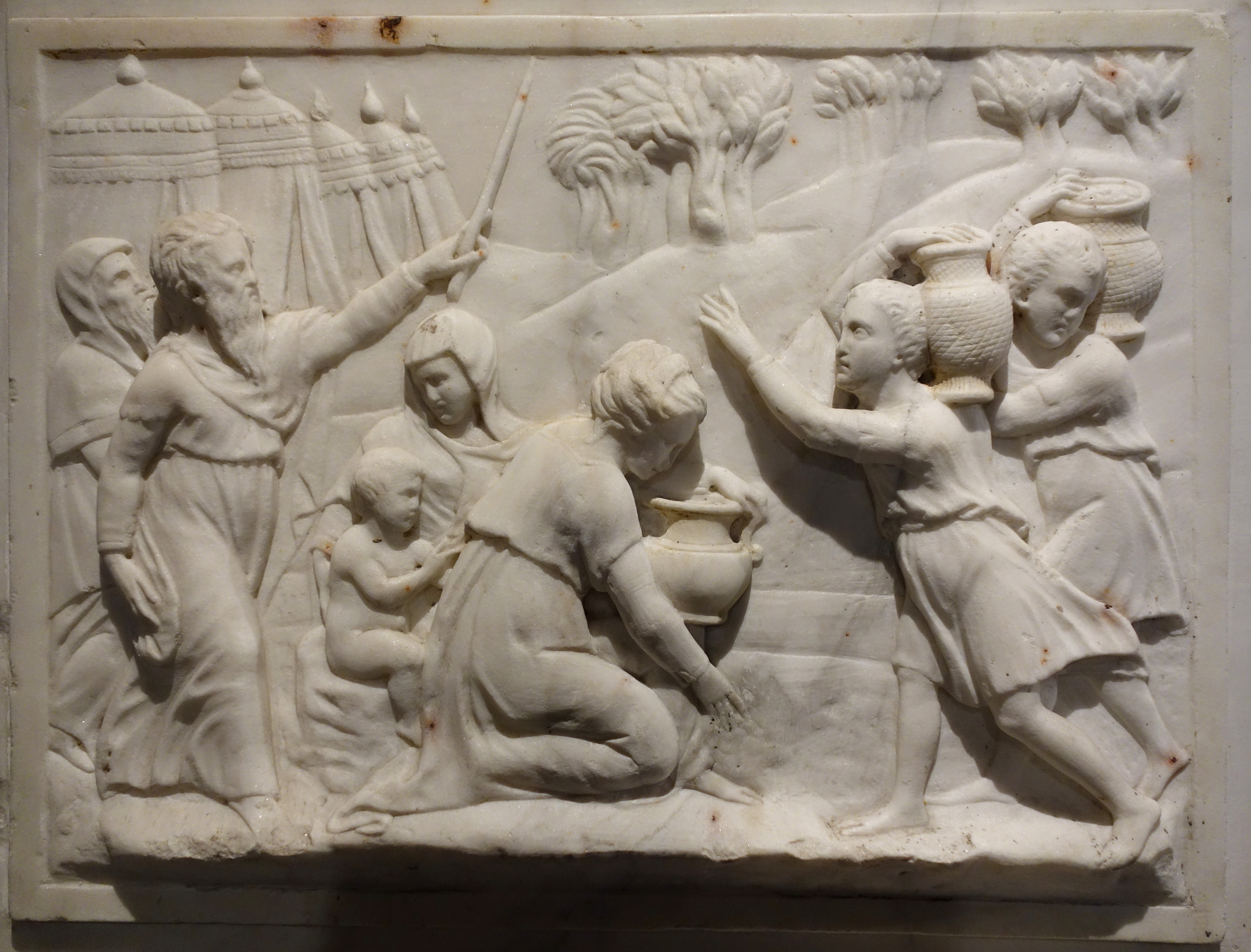
Moses Bringing Water from the Rock, perhaps by Taddeo Carlone, 1600

Taddeo Carlone (died 25 March 1613) was a Swiss-Italian sculptor and architect.

His father, Giovanni, was a sculptor from Como. A native of Rovio, in Ticino, he moved with his father to Genoa. Taddeo's brother Giuseppe was a sculptor with his brother, and later in Lombardy. Taddeo married Geronima Verra in Genoa. He became the head of an important family of artists, including his sons Giovanni Battista and Giovanni, who were noted painters. Bernardo and Tommaso, sons of Giuseppe, were sculptors and architects in Genoa and Piedmont.

He died in 1613 and was buried in Genoa at the church (no longer extant) of San Francesco in Castelletto.

== Works ==
His works include

- Marble statue of San Antonio Abato in the oratory of Santa Caterina d’Alessandria in Alassio
- Tombs for members of the Doria family in the church of Santa Maria della Cella in Sampierdarena, now part of Genoa
- Statue of Santo Stefano originally at the Porta dell’Arco of the church of Santo Stefano in Genoa, now relocated to via Banderali
- Portrait of Andrea Doria, now in the Palazzo Ducale in Genoa
- Façade of the Sanctuary of Nostra Signora della Misericordia in Savona

== Sources ==
- Bartoletti, Massimo; Laura Damiani Cabrini (1997). I Carlone di Rovio. Lugano: Fidia edizioni d'arte.
