= Giovanni Domenico Cappellino =

Italian painter (1580–1651)

Giovanni Domenico Cappellino (1580–1651) was an Italian Baroque painter, active mainly in his natal city of Genoa. He was the pupil of the painter Giovanni Battista Paggi. At age 22, he painted a Saint Sebastian for the church of Santa Sabina. He contributed a canvas to the Oratory of San Giacomo della Marina. In Genoa, he painted a Death of St. Francis for the church of San Niccolo, and a St. Francesca Romana for the church of San Stefano.
