= Orazio Cambiasi =

Spanish painter

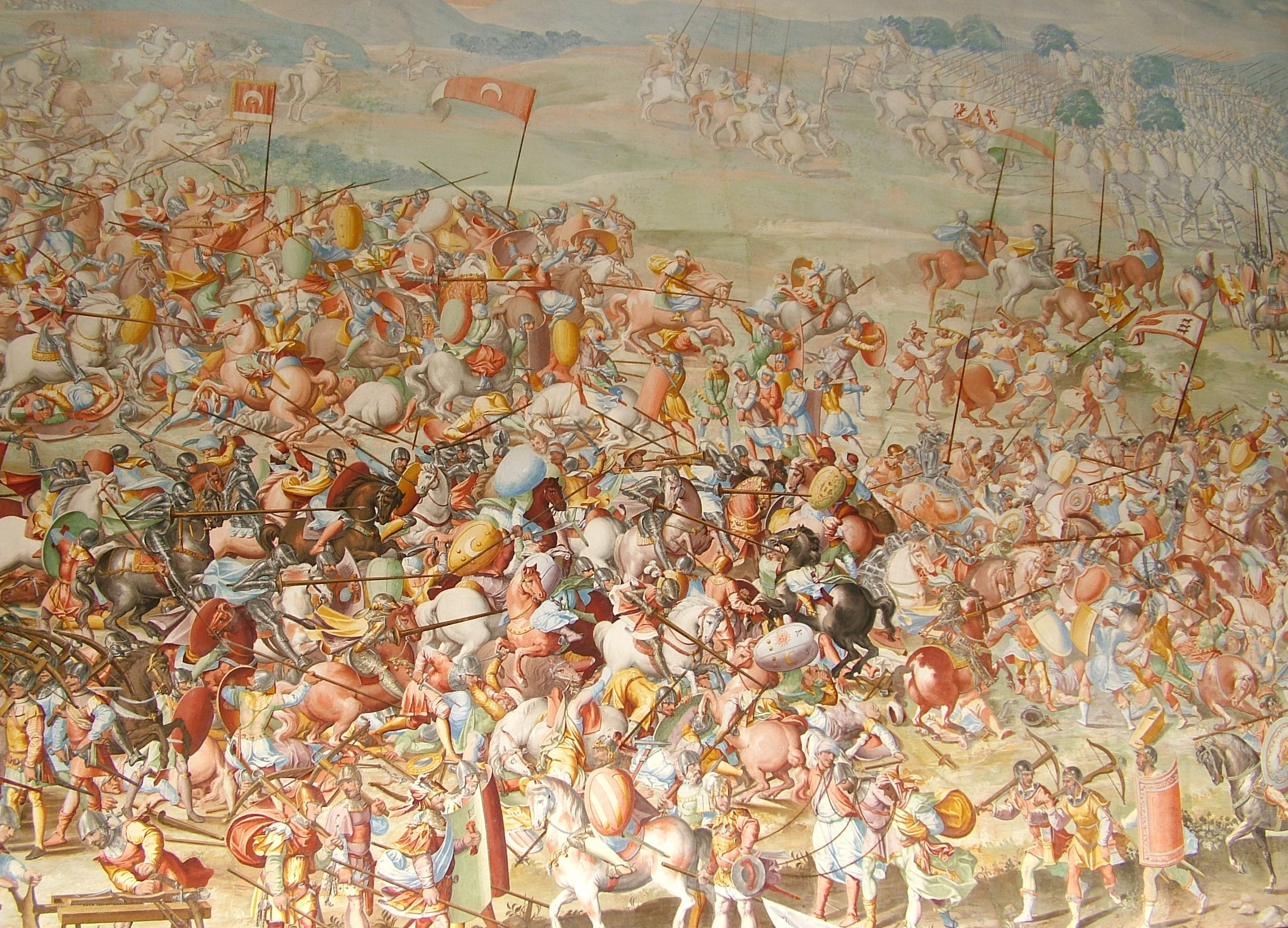
The Battle of Higueruela (detail) by Orazio Cambiasi, Fabrizio Castello, Luca Cambiasi and Lazzaro Tavarone, in the Gallery of Battles at the Royal Monastery of San Lorenzo de El Escorial

Orazio Cambiasi, also Orazio Cambiaso, was an Italian Baroque painter of the Genoese school of the late sixteenth and early seventeenth century.

Cambiasi was born to the painter Luca Cambiaso, who trained him. He specialized in frescos decorative painting grotesques. In 1583 he accompanied Lazzaro Tavarone to Spain, where his father was appointed Painter to the King to King Philip II, and commissioned for the frescoes in the choir of the Royal Monastery of San Lorenzo de El Escorial. He joined his father, Fabrizio Castello, Niccolò Granello, and many others to complete the works. He returned to Genoa in 1585 after the death of his father, where he took up teaching, mentoring among others Giovanni Andrea Ansaldo, Simone Barabino, Giulio Benso, and Giovanni Battista Castello.
