= Fabrizio Castello =

Italian painter

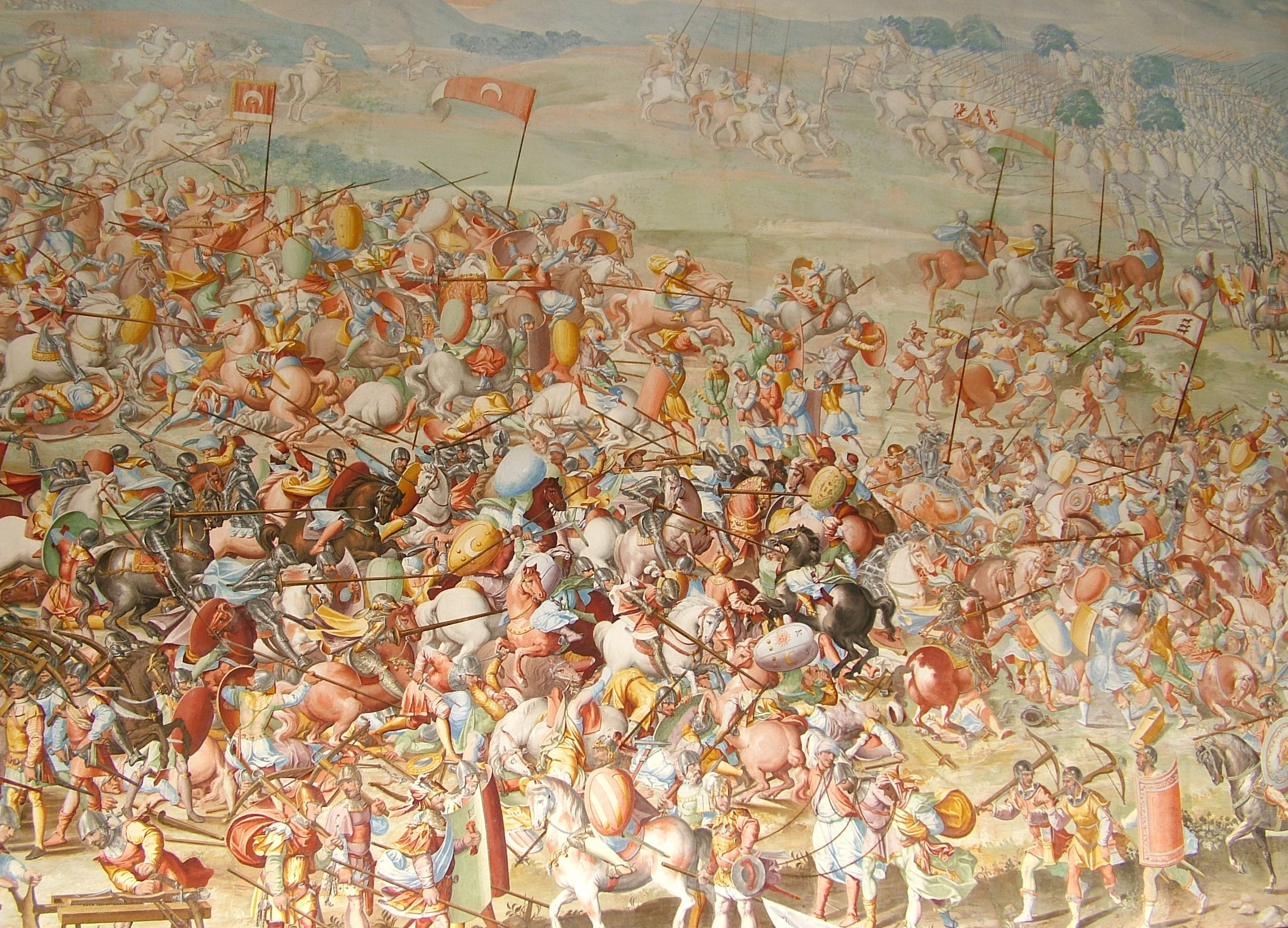
The Battle of Higueruela (detail) by Fabrizio Castello, Luca Cambiasi and Lazzaro Tavarone, in the Gallery of Battles at the Royal Monastery of San Lorenzo de El Escorial

Fabrizio Castello (1562–1617) was an Italian painter of Genoese origin settled in Spain. He was a fresco painter who specialized in ornamental painting grotesques.

== Early life ==
Fabrizio is also listed as being nicknamed il Figonetto. He was the son of the historical painter Giovanni Battista Castello, and arrived in Spain around 1567 when his father had been called by Álvaro de Bazán, 1st Marquis of Santa Cruz to work on his palace in Viso del Marqués. After his father's death in 1569, Castello was in the care of his half brother Niccolò Granello, who taught him the trade. It has documented that in March 1576, that Granello, painter to the king, increased the salary of his half-brother, who worked as his assistant; an obligation which was released in October 1577, when upon reaching the maturity began to appear in the factory books from the Royal Monastery of San Lorenzo de El Escorial independently, with a salary of 5 reales day.

== Early career ==
As a member of the team of artists led by his half-brother, who also had his other brothers helping, Castello worked in the pictorial decoration of various units of the basilica and Monastery of El Escorial. In 1582 he was commissioned with one of his brothers to paint the original painting of the choir of the basilica, possibly consisting of a simple paneled pretense, soon replaced by a work of Luca Cambiasi. It is likely that between 1583 and 1584 that Castello participated in the decoration of the vaults of the vestry and sacristy of the monastery, where some soft modeling figures other than the detail work employed by Granello, may apply to, but documentation mentions only his half brother.

== Collaborations ==
In June 1584 Castello was appointed painter to the king, with a salary of 16 ducats per month. Then in December of that same year, he was commissioned to paint the ceiling of the chambers of the Queen, known then as the Gallery of Battles, in which he worked alongside his brother, as a principal, and two additional team members: Cambiasi, and his own son, Orazio Cambiasi and Lazzaro Tavarone. With a repertoire of fantastic and allegorical motifs, and inspired by the designs of Perino del Vaga, the four painters completed in just six months the painting of the nearly two hundred feet across the room, and charged for non-work the inconsiderable figure of 1000 ducados. The same team then worked on painting the roofs of the two rooms of the chapter, while in the hall retouched paintings, work that occupied them throughout the following year. In January 1587 they were hired for the large fresco painting of the Battle of La Higueruela in the same room, a very different sort of painting of grotesques which was made and for which it served as a model of an old canvas painted in grisaille found in the Alcázar of Segovia and restored by Castello in 1581. After this painting, in September 1589, with Granello and Tavarone, as Cambiasi had returned to Italy, he was hired to work on the paintings of the remaining walls, accounting for the first four episodes devoted to the Battle of St. Quentin. In February 1591, even without concluding these frescoes, he began working on painting the grotesques.

== Personal life ==
Married to Catherine Mata, named his first child in El Escorial in 1586, another painter of his team, Juan Serrano, related to his wife, acted as the godfather. In 1595, living in Madrid, another son was born, Felix Castello, who continued his trade as a painter.

== See also ==
- Brown, Jonathan, The Hall of Battles of El Escorial: the work of art as a cultural artefact, Ediciones Universidad de Salamanca, 1998, ISBN 84-7481-885-0
- Garcia-Frias Checa, Carmen, "Artists Genoese decorative painting grotesques of the Monastery of San Lorenzo de El Escorial" in Colomer, José Luis, dir., Spain and Genoa: Works, artists and collectors, Madrid, 2004, ISBN 84-933403-4-0
- Newcome, Mary, "Genoese fresco painters in El Escorial" in Giampaolo, Mario, coord., Italian frescoes of El Escorial, Madrid, Electa, 1993, ISBN 84-8156-056-1
