= Palazzo Gio Vincenzo Imperiale =

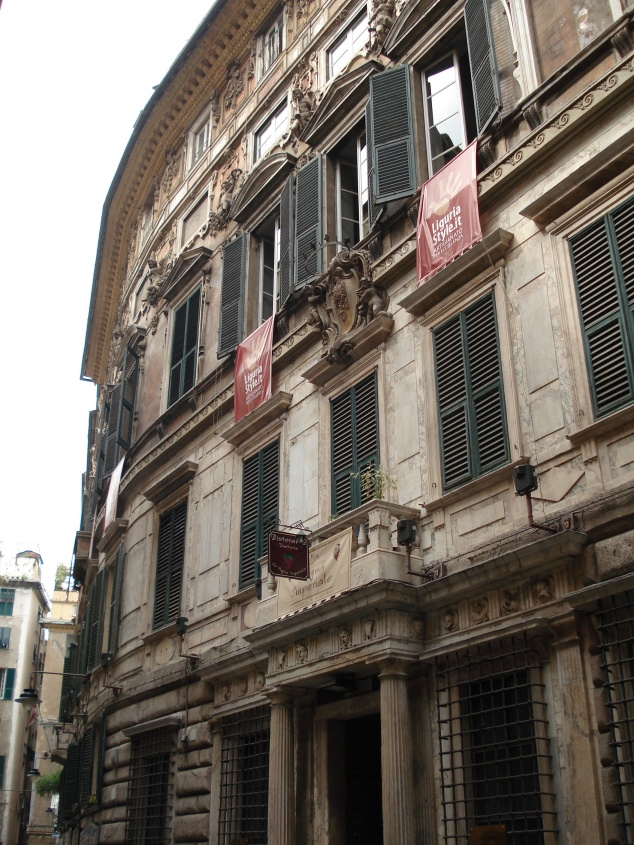
- Façade of the Palazzo Gio Vincenzo Imperiale in Piazza Campetto 8a
- Interactive map of the Palazzo Gio Vincenzo Imperiale area

General information
- Status: In use
- Type: Palace
- Architectural style: Mannerist
- Location: Genoa, Italy, 8a Piazza Campetto
- Coordinates: 44.409028°N 8.931703°E
- Current tenants: Housing/offices
- Construction started: 1560
- Completed: 1560

Design and construction
- Architects: Giovan Battista Castello; Andrea Ansaldo

The Palazzo Vincenzo Imperiale is a building in Campetto at number 8a, in the area of the Soziglia Market in the historical centre of Genoa. The building was included in the list of palaces included in the Rolli di Genova. Designed and decorated in the second half of the 16th century by Giovan Battista Castello, it constitutes one of the major Mannerist creations in Liguria.

== History ==
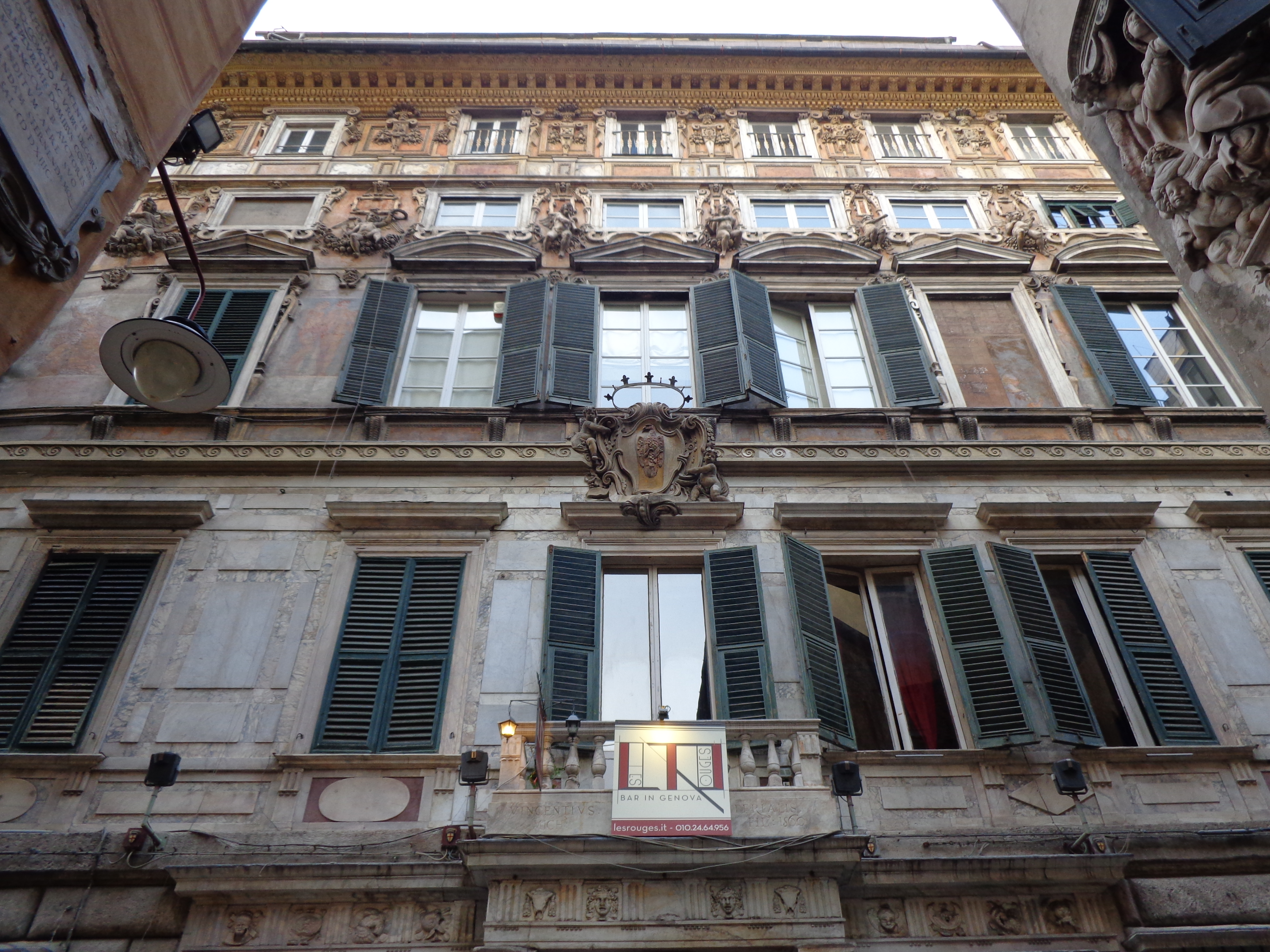
Particular of the façade

Adjacent to the disappeared Palazzo Spinola Doria and dominating almost the whole of Campetto, the palace was built around 1560 by the celebrated artist Giovan Battista Castello known as il Bergamasco for Vincenzo Imperiale, as is written on the architrave of the main portalː VINCENTIUS IMPERIALIS MICHAELIS FILIUS 1560. His son Gio Giacomo, who had it in fideicommissum, commissioned the extension towards Soziglia to a design by Andrea Ansaldo, and the construction of the rectifilo that connects it to San Lorenzo.

Included from 1576 in the first list of rolls of Genoa with Vincenzo's heirs, he remained there until that of 1664. Since, in 1584, Gio Giacomo Imperiale — elected in 1617—1619 doge of the Republic of Genoa — opened the new 'imperial road' (today Scurreria la Nuova), a small part of the façade is, together with the portal, visible from Piazza San Lorenzo according to a perspective not envisaged by the Castle, which imagined a sumptuous façade to respond to a foreshortened view from below upwards.

He then bequeathed it to his son, Giovanni Vincenzo Imperiale, a famous man of letters who housed one of the city's most famous art collections, divided between the palace and the villa in Sampierdarena, known as Villa Imperiale «La Bellezza». Among the most famous pieces were the Portrait of Giovanni Vincenzo Imperiale, by Antoon van Dyck (1626), now in New York, National Gallery of Art, and the Portrait of the Marchioness Brigida Spinola Doria, second wife of Vincenzo Imperiale, by Peter Paul Rubens, now in Washington, National Gallery of Art.

The palace was damaged in the naval bombardment of 1684 and more seriously in the aerial bombardment of 1942.

== Description ==
=== Façade ===
The façade, unanimously attributed to Bergamasco, presents clear references to the Roman Palazzo Massimo alle Colonne, a masterpiece by Peruzzi. Like this one, it curves to follow the irregular course of the piazza, and has a portal on the ground floor with columns and frieze of Doric order, which opens onto an ashlar roof.

In contrast to the sobriety of the ground and first piano nobile, on the upper floors a lively decoration unfolds, with an unusual and anticlassical repertoire, where stucco fantasies clearly prevail over the frescoed backgrounds. On the second piano nobile elongated female herms in profile support alternating triangular and ribbed tympanums resting on curved volutes reminiscent of Ionic capitals. On the upper floor, the elaborate stuccowork reaches its acme in the window frames, in the demonic, lion, zoomorphic and winged masks, and in the rounded putti seated on garlands, stuccowork that echoes the elaborate ornamentation of the famous Francis I Gallery|Fontainebleau Gallery, here unexpectedly bringing it back to an external elevation. On the last level, in the theory of herms placed alternately in frontal view and in profile, the fantasy tends towards the monstrous grotesque.

The Greek deities depicted in fresco between the windows follow a cryptic magical-alchemical symbology, inspired by Hermeticism (philosophy) and the ancient text of the Picatrix. The most prominent figure above the main portal is Jupiter, with thunderbolts in his fist, seated on the eagle, the symbol of the Imperial household. This is followed by the Three Graces, Diana, Mars, Apollo, Venus. On the other side, the deities of the sublunar world, Ceres, Proserpine, and Hebe. The frescoes are considered the late work of Ansaldo, from the third decade of the 17th century.

=== Interior ===
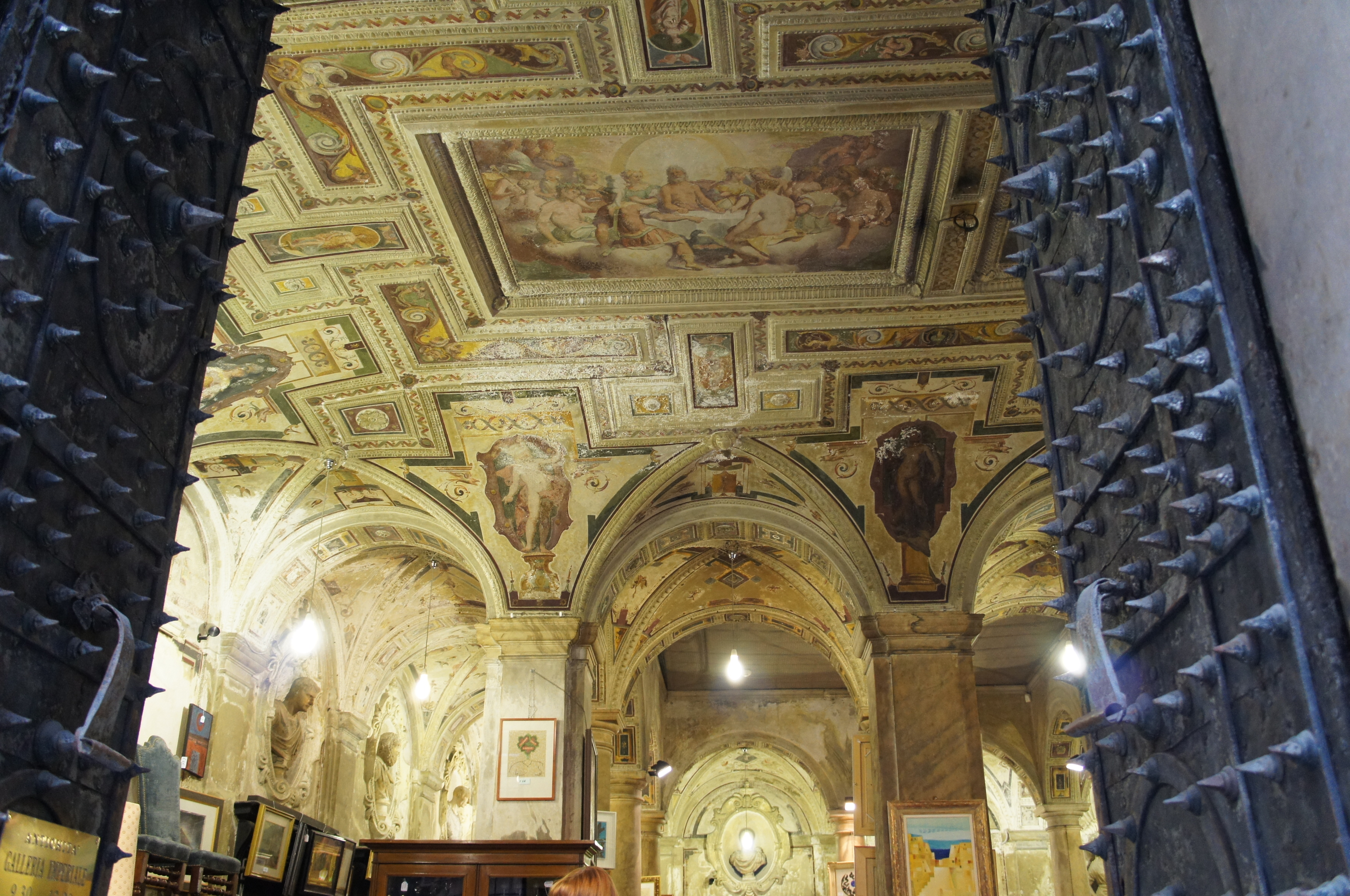
Frescoed atrium

The large atrium on the ground floor opens completely with four arches towards the courtyard: pillars support the arches, similarly to the palazzo Cambiaso Pallavicini in Strada Nuova, today's via Garibaldi. The interiors preserve on the ground floor frescoes by Giovanni Battista Castello and Luca Cambiaso with a fantasy of grotesques and stucco-framed figurines, among which the two major episodesː the banquet for the Marriage of Cupid and Psyche and Cupid asks Jupiter for Psyche in marriage'.

Centred on a square courtyard with only two bays on each side, the palazzo, which the Anonymous in 1818 described as immense, is developed on staircases facing loggias differently oriented in unprecedented unfolding of spaces. A shop now occupies the entire ground floor, so that the staircase is accessible from a secondary entrance to the right of the main entrance. The staircase leads to the first floor, which houses a bar/restaurant and an architectural studio. It also housed the Filigree Museum.

The frescoes on the first floor, the Rooms of Apollo and the Rape of Proserpine, are in a poor state of conservation.

On the second piano nobile, a famous 'pictorial duel' took place between Luca Cambiaso and Giovanni Battista Castello, who frescoed — separated by a partition but with compatible and high results according to Raffaele Soprani — several episodes of the Stories of Cleopatra. Other decorations can be attributed to Bernardo Castello (Sala della Gerusalemme Liberata) and Domenico Piola, who intervened to repair the damage left by the Sun King's bombs in 1684. The staircase also features a frescoed decoration on the vault, with fine grotesques and beautiful portals surmounted by marble busts, as well as frescoes depicting the Contention between Apollo and Love and Apollo and Daphne, painted by Cambiaso. Today, the best-preserved rooms are the Conquest of Jerusalem room, frescoed on the vault by Bernardo Castello, together with six episodes from Jerusalem Delivered pertaining to the history of Genoa, and the Virtues of Athenian Cimon room, also by Cambiaso (for the frescoes) and Bergamasco (for the stuccoes).

Subdivided in the 19th century into rented flats, brutally stripped by wartime neglect, inside it is still possible to admire a monumental fireplace.

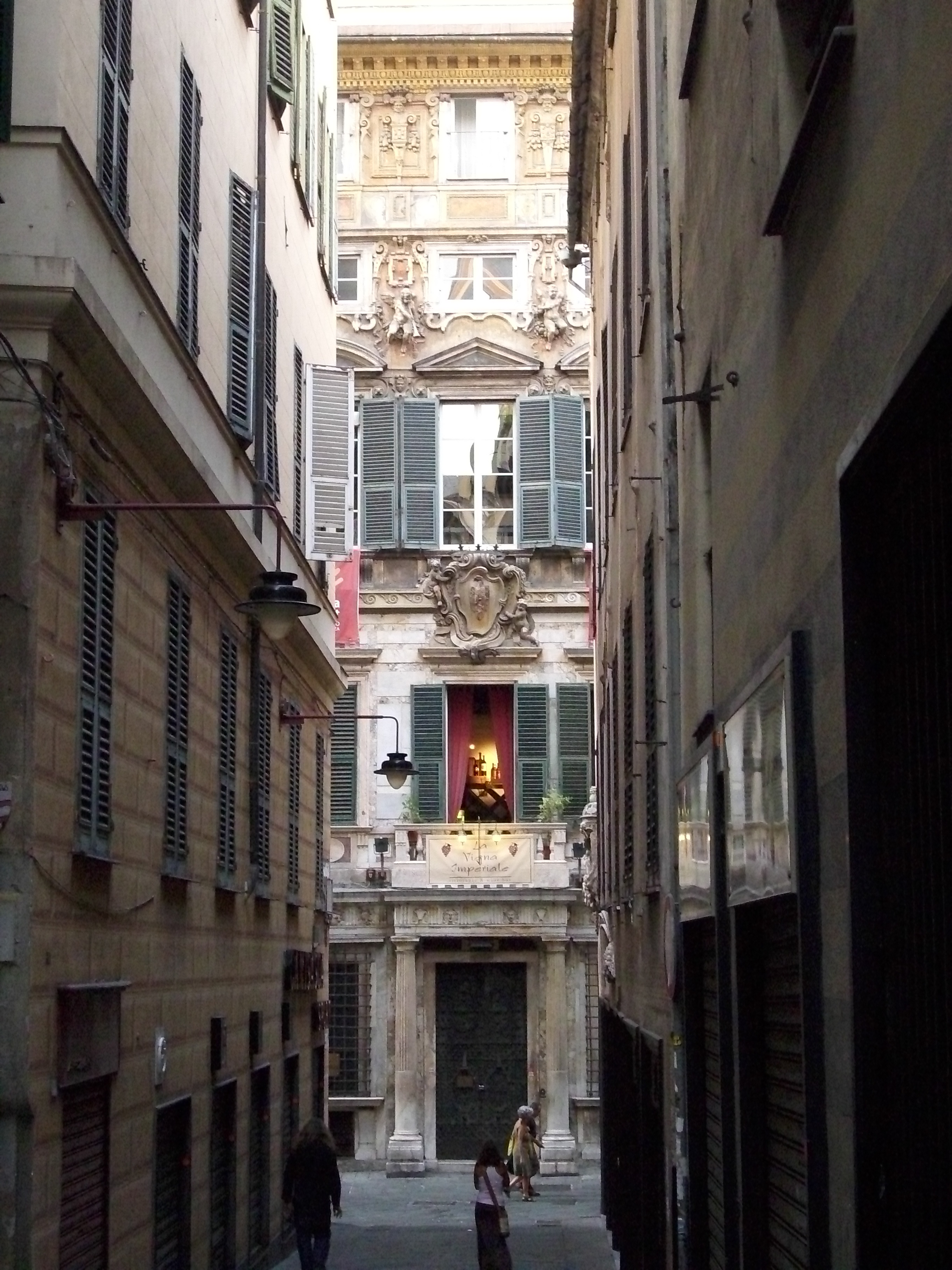
Part of the façade seen from via di Scurreria

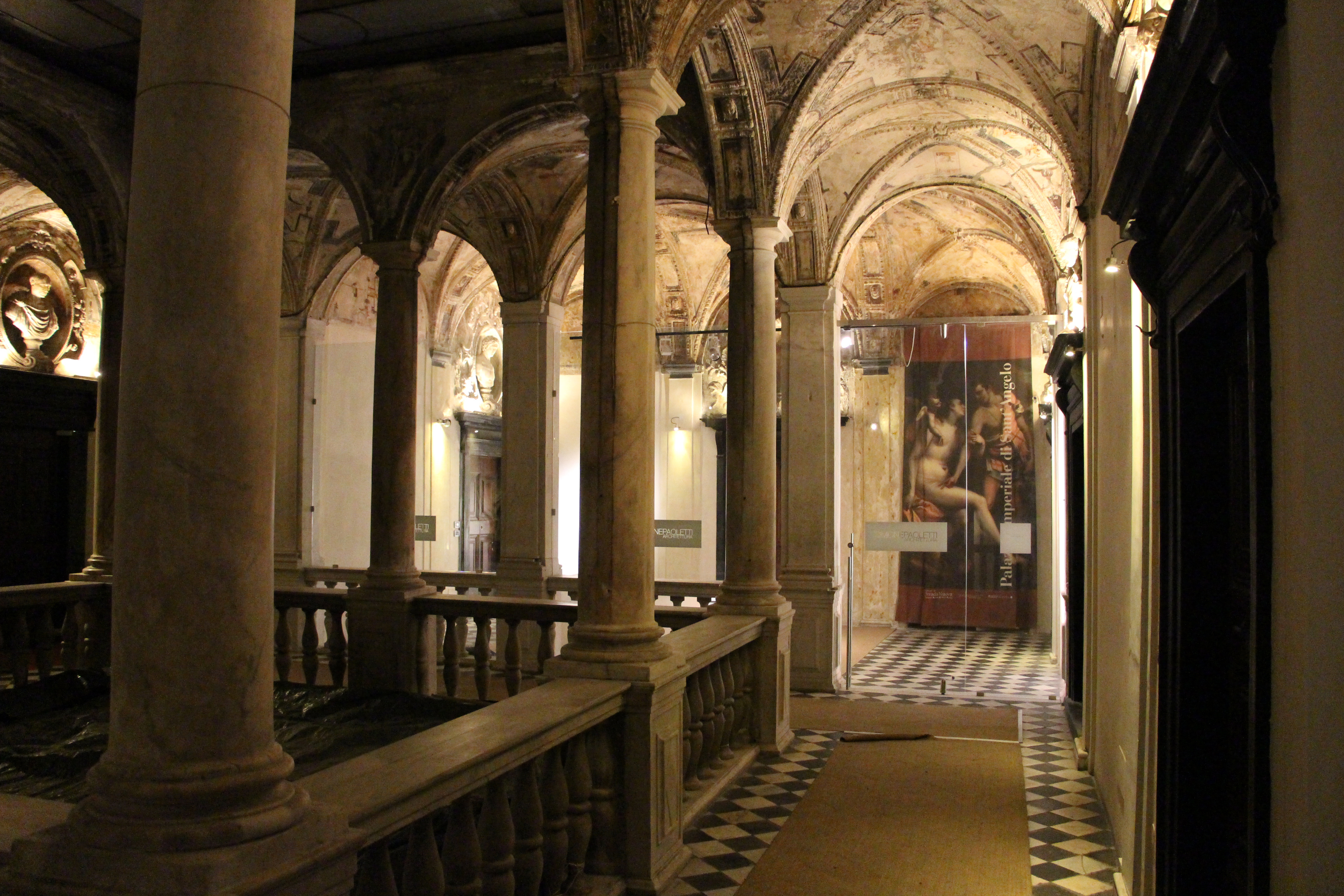
The courtyard

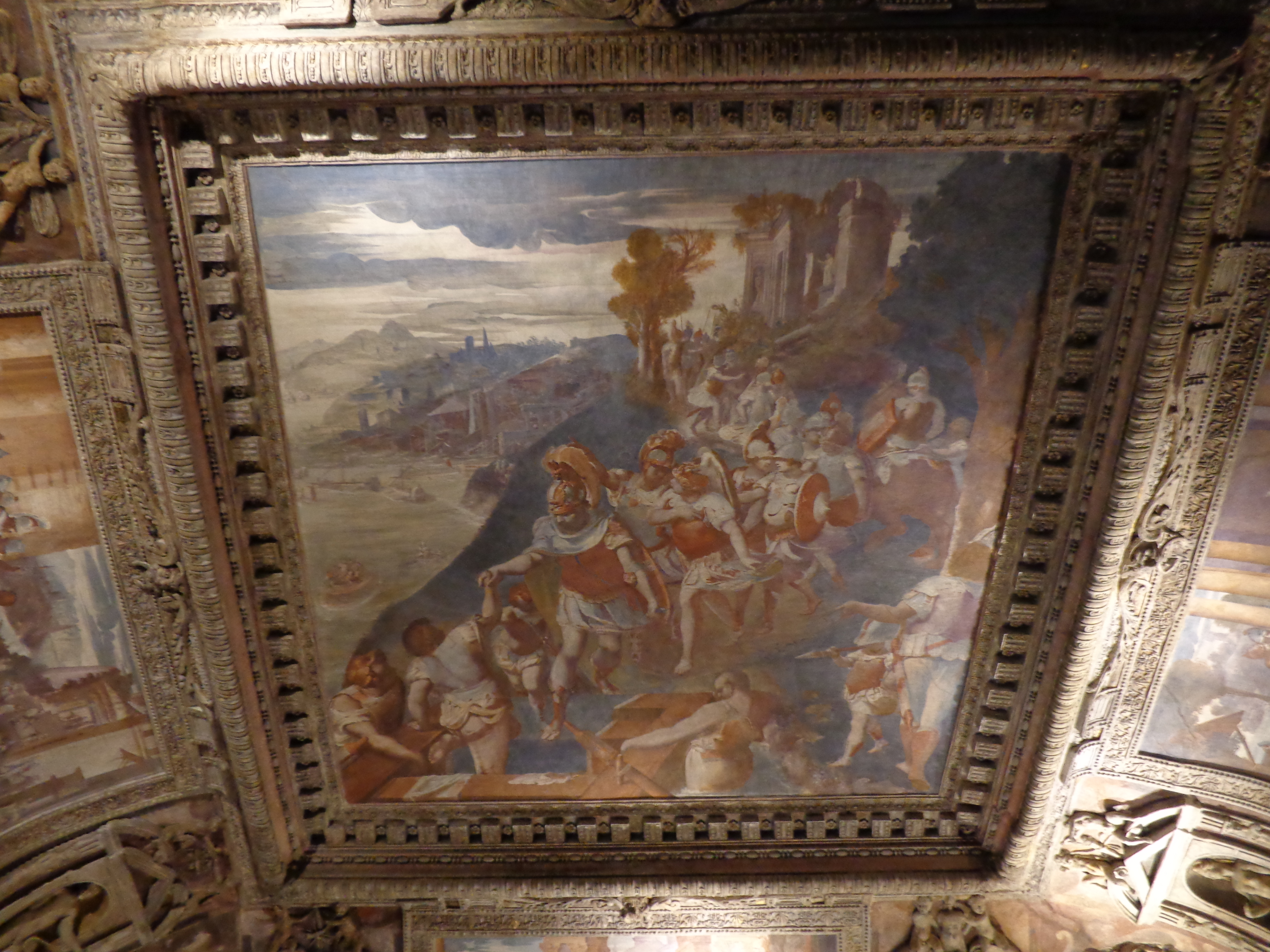
Embarkation of Cimon, fresco on the second floor

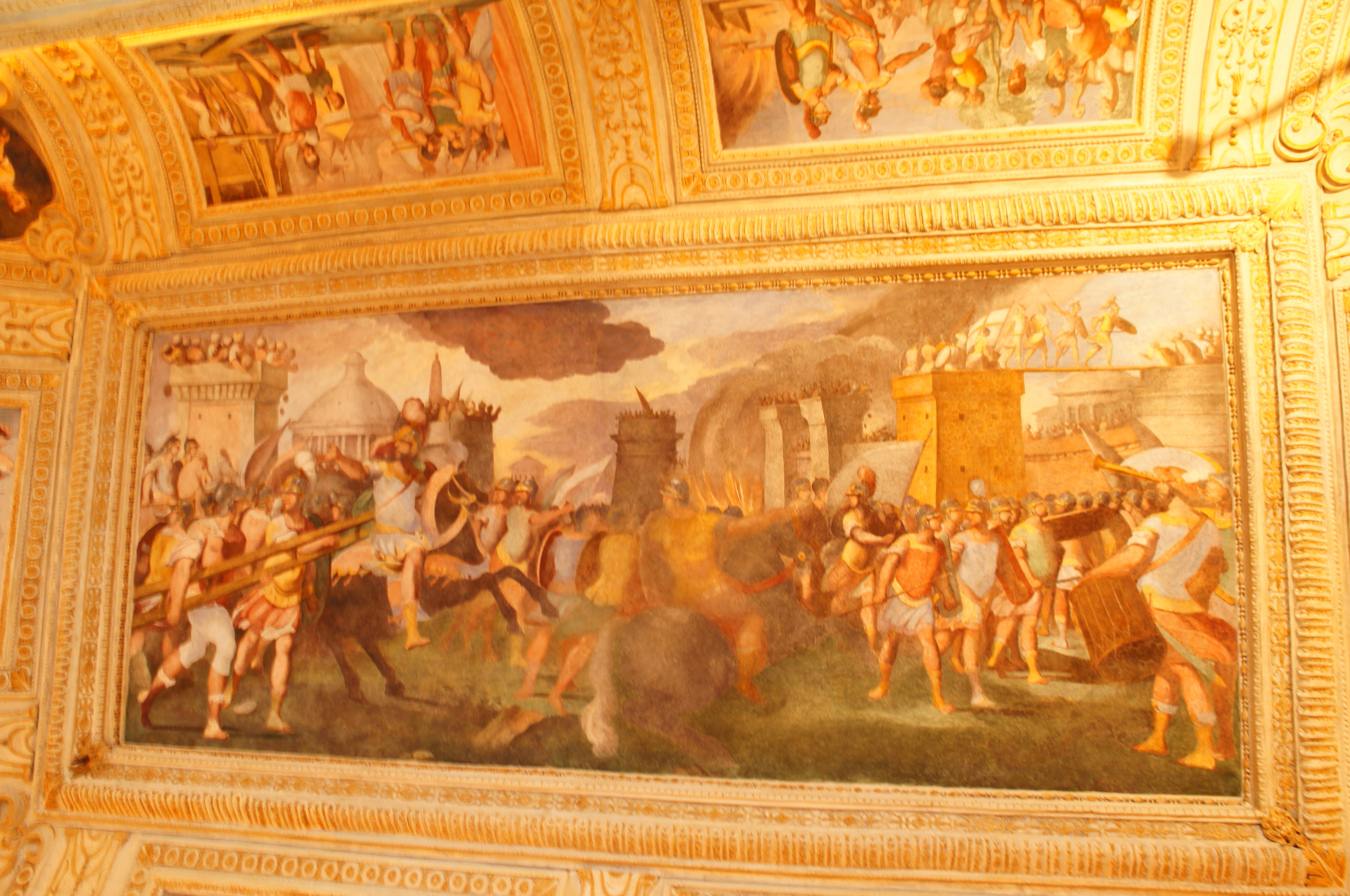
Bernardo Castello, Conquest of Jerusalem.

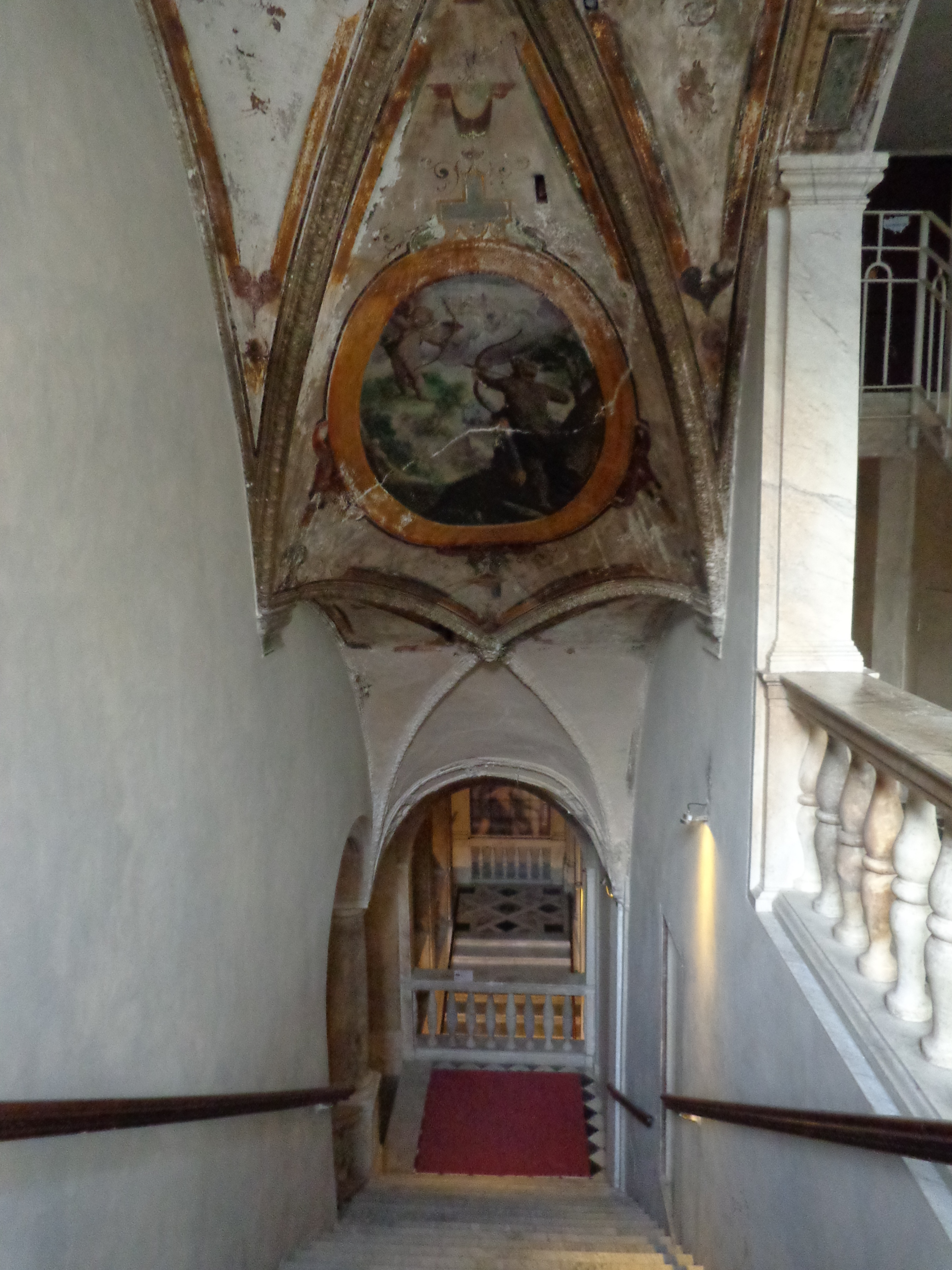
Scala

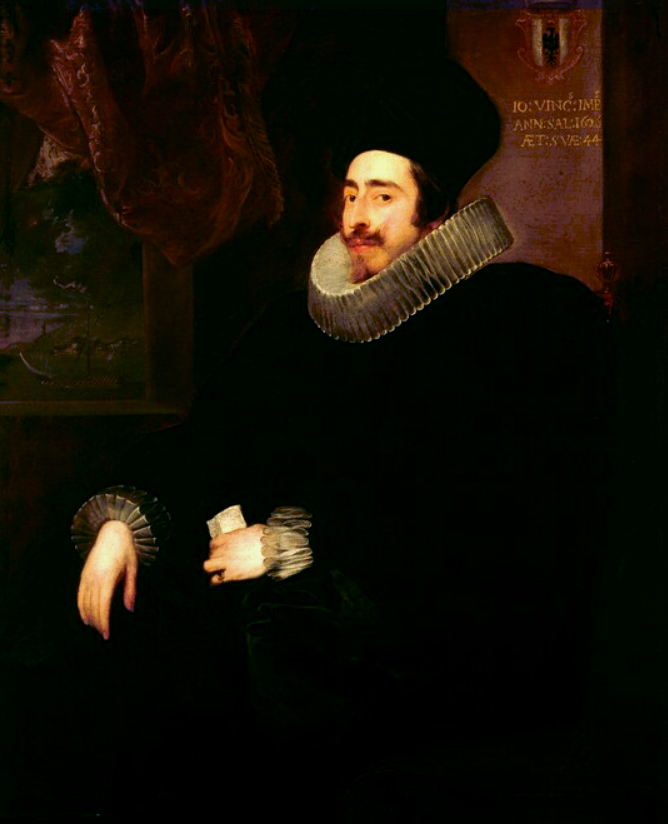
Anthony van Dyck, Portrait of Giovanni Vincenzo Imperiale, 1626, New York, National Gallery of Art

.
