= San Bartolomeo degli Armeni =

Church building in Genoa, Italy

Coordinates: 44°24′47.85″N 8°56′39.41″E

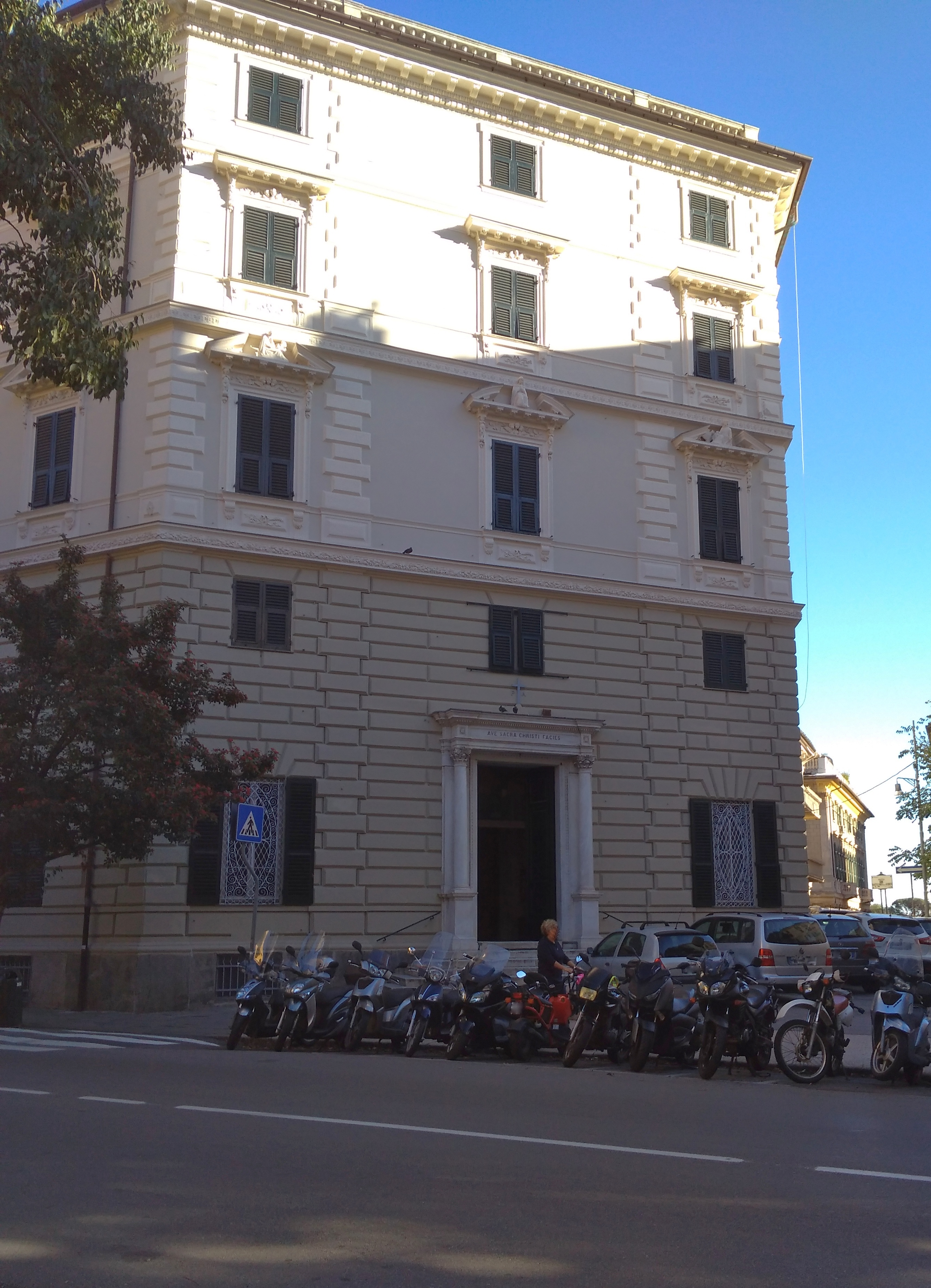
Genoa, Castelletto district, facade of the church of San Bartolomeo degli Armeni

San Bartolomeo degli Armeni is an Armenian Catholic church in the quarter of Castelletto in Genoa, northern Italy.

The church was founded in 1308 by a group of monks who were fleeing the Turkish invasion of southern Armenia. Of the original edifice, the apse, the dome and the left chapel remain; the right chapel was destroyed in 1883.

The church houses the "Holy Face of Edessa", a line relic with a tempera painting of the face of Jesus, which the Genoese doge Leonardo Montaldo received from the Byzantine emperor, and which he donated to the Basilians. The church houses artworks by Giovanni Battista Paggi, Orazio de Ferrari, Giulio Benso, Lazzaro Tavarone, Giacomo Boni, Luca Cambiasi, Anton Maria Maragliano and others.

== Sources ==
- Paglieri, Nadia Pazzini; Rinangelo Paglieri (1990). Chiese in Liguria. Genoa: Sagep Editrice. ISBN 88-7058-361-9.
