= Lazzaro Tavarone =

Italian painter

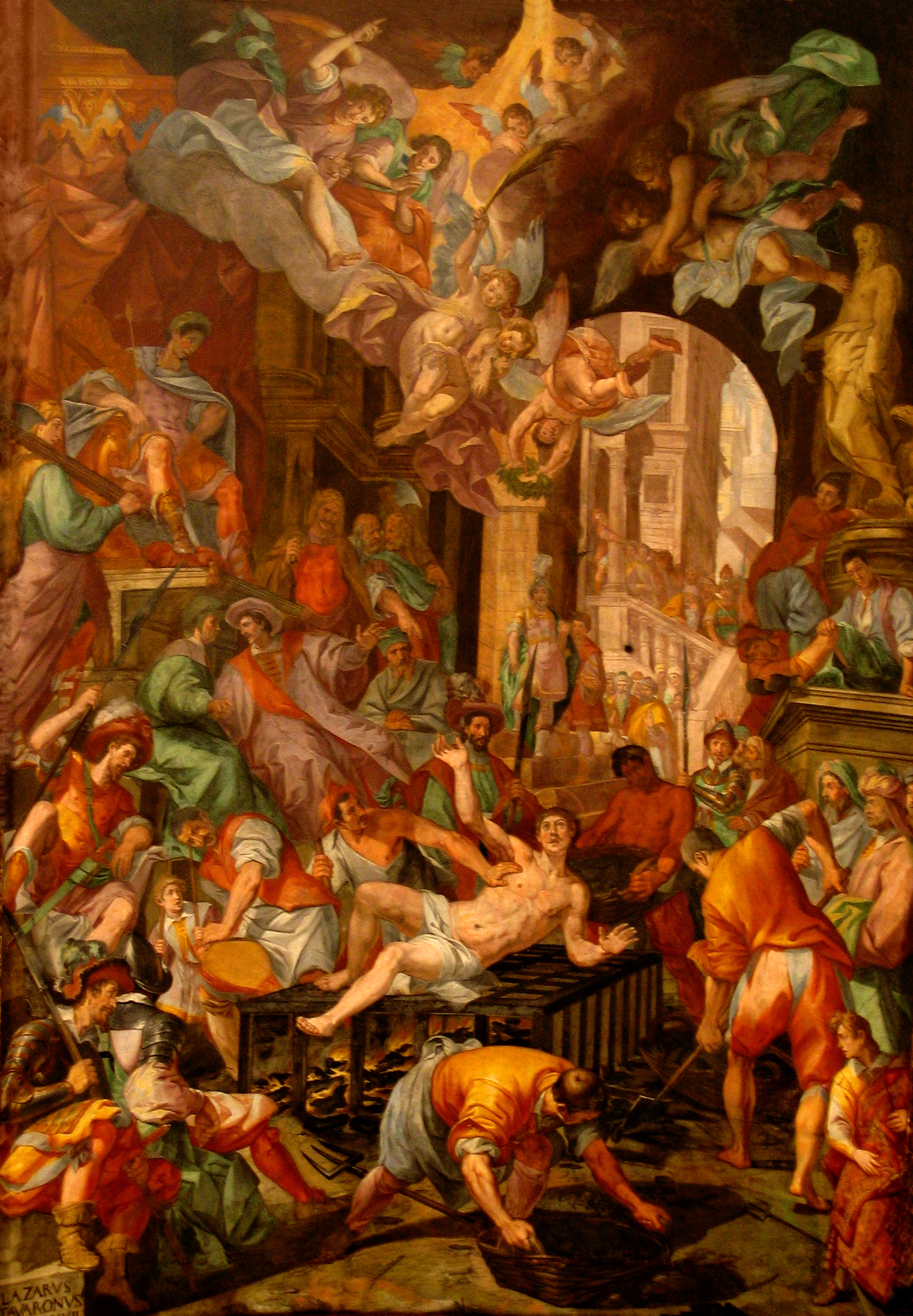
- Fresco by Lazzaro Tavarone on the presbytery vault of Genoa Cathedral, depicting the Martyrdom of Saint Lawrence
- Born: 1556; Genoa, Republic of Genoa
- Died: 1641 (aged 84–85); Genoa, Republic of Genoa
- Education: Luca Cambiaso
- Style: Mannerism

Lazzaro Tavarone (1556 – 1641) was an Italian painter of the late-Renaissance and Mannerist period, active mainly in his native Genoa and in Spain.

== Biography ==
A pupil of Luca Cambiaso, Tavarone accompanied his master to Spain in 1583, and helped decorate the Escorial for the Spanish King, including the chaotic battle painting of Battle of La Higueruela.

Following Cambiaso's death in 1585, he frescoed the royal apartments at the Escorial, particularly the Sala de las Batallas, alongside Cambiaso's son Orazio, Fabrizio Castello and Niccolò Granello.

Tavarone returned to Genoa in 1594, where he became well known both as portrait and history painter. Between 1606 and 1608, he decorated the façade of the Palazzo San Giorgio, using a complex iconographic scheme dictated by his patrons.

In 1612, he frescoed the vault of the new presbytery in the Basilica of Santa Maria delle Vigne, depicting The Glory of Mary, The Marriage of the Virgin and The Circumcision. These frescoes represent a departure from Cambiaso's style, featuring realistic figurative elements and a strong narrative focus.

In 1614, Tavarone executed an elaborate cycle of frescoes for Giacomo Saluzzo's Villa Paradiso in Albaro. The cycle, highly praised by Soprani, features a richly decorative programme filled with allegorical figures and dense with conceptual meaning. The following year, Tavarone created another cycle of frescoes for the Palazzo Nicola Grimaldi in Vico San Luca, as well as decorating the main floors of the Palazzo Spinola di Pellicceria.

In 1622, Tavarone painted two frescoes for Genoa Cathedral: The Judgement of Saint Lawrence in the apse semi-dome and The Martyrdom of Saint Lawrence on the presbytery vault.

In 1626, he painted a large fresco depicting the Last Supper for the Ospedale di Pammatone. When the hospital was demolished, the fresco was removed and relocated to the right nave of Genoa Cathedral.

His last known works were realized between 1627 and 1634 for the Oratory of the Confraternity of Saints Nazarius and Celsus in Multedo.

Tavarone died in Genoa in 1641.
