= San Matteo (Genoa) =

Roman Catholic church in Genoa, Liguria, Italy

Coordinates: 44°24′29.60″N 8°55′58.90″E

Church of Saint Matthew (Chiesa di San Matteo)
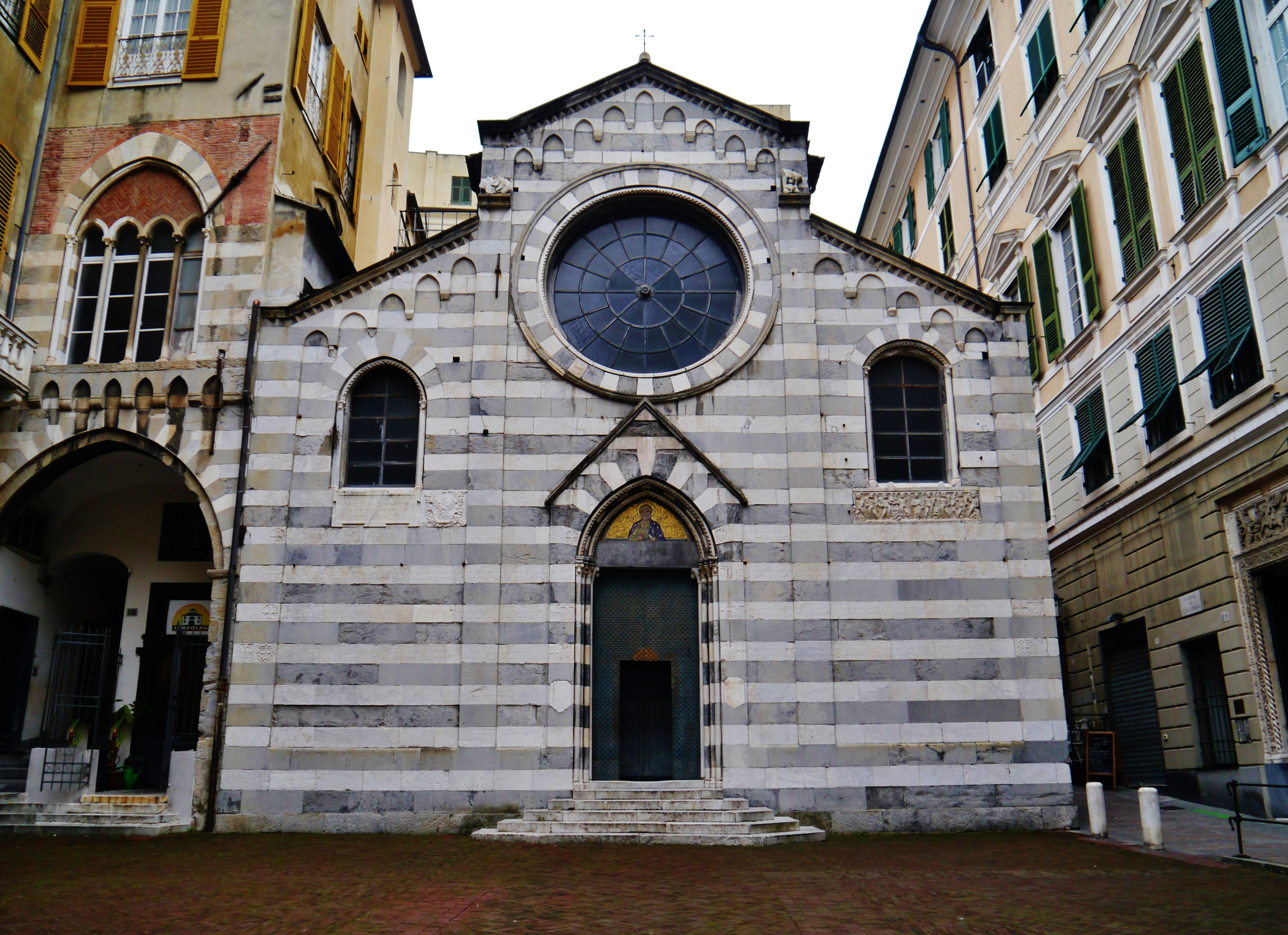
- The façade of the Basilica.

Religion
- Affiliation: Roman Catholic
- Province: Genoa
- Ecclesiastical or organisational status: National monument
- Status: Active

Location
- Location: Genoa, Italy
- Interactive map of Church of Saint Matthew (Chiesa di San Matteo)

Architecture
- Type: Church
- Style: Gothic
- Completed: 1125

San Matteo is a Roman Catholic church in Genoa, in the region of Liguria, Italy.

== History ==
The church was founded in 1125 by Martino Doria, as the private chapel of his family. In 1278 it was totally renewed in Gothic style.

The building was again renovated in the mid-16th century by order of Andrea Doria, who commissioned the work to Giovanni Angelo Montorsoli (changes included the presbytery and the dome). It was further renovated in 1557–1559, under design by Giovanni Battista Castello (nave and aisles) and decoration, realized by Luca Cambiaso among the others.

== Description ==
Of the Gothic building, the nave, aisles and the façade are in white (marble) and black (slate) stripes, divided into three sectors by fake columns with Lombard bands; in the center is a large rose window, while on the sides are two double mullioned windows. The façade includes a late Roman sarcophagus with an Allegory of the Autumn, which originally was used as the tomb of Lamba Doria, who had taken it to Genoa from Korčula in Dalmatia. At one time, large chains, which once had protected the harbor of Pisa and which had been obtained as booty after the victory at the Battle of Meloria (1284), were draped across the facade. In the 19th century, they were returned to Pisa.

On the left side of the church is the cloister of St. Matthew, of quadrangular plan, dating to 1308. It has ogival arches on double small columns.

Artworks of the interior include the Miracle of the Ethiopian Dragon by Luca Cambiaso and the Vocation of St. Matthew by Giovanni Battista Castello, a wooden "Deposition" by Anton Maria Maragliano, and the tomb of Andrea Doria, executed by Montorsoli, in the crypt. At the high altar is a Holy Family with St. Anne by Bernardo Castello (16th century). According to the tradition, the sword housed under the altar belonged to Andrea Doria, and was donated to this church by Pope Paul III. The church has an original organ, constructed by Antonio Alari in 1773.

== Sources ==
- Pazzini Paglieri, Nadia; Rinangelo Paglieri (1990). Chiese in Liguria. Genoa: Sagep. 88-7058-361-9.
- The City of Genoa (1908) by Robert Walter Carden; Publisher Methuen and Co., 36 Essex St. W.C. London, England. pages 220-244.
