= Domenico Bellando =

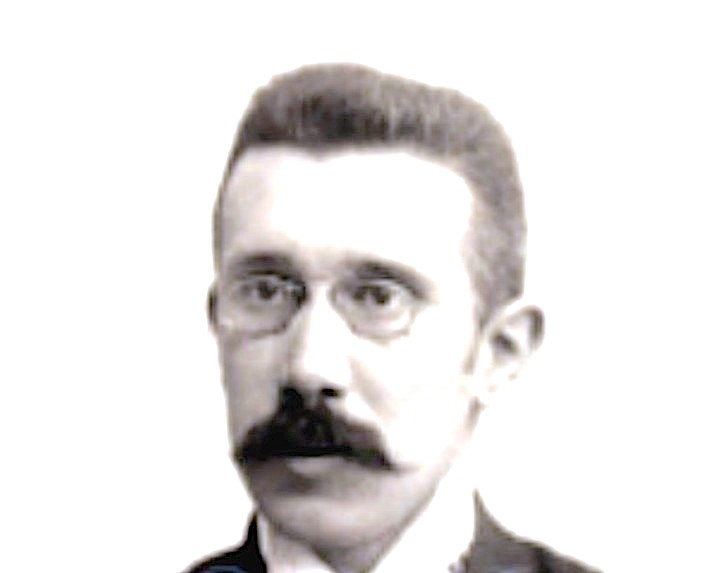
Domenico Bellando (1868-1922)

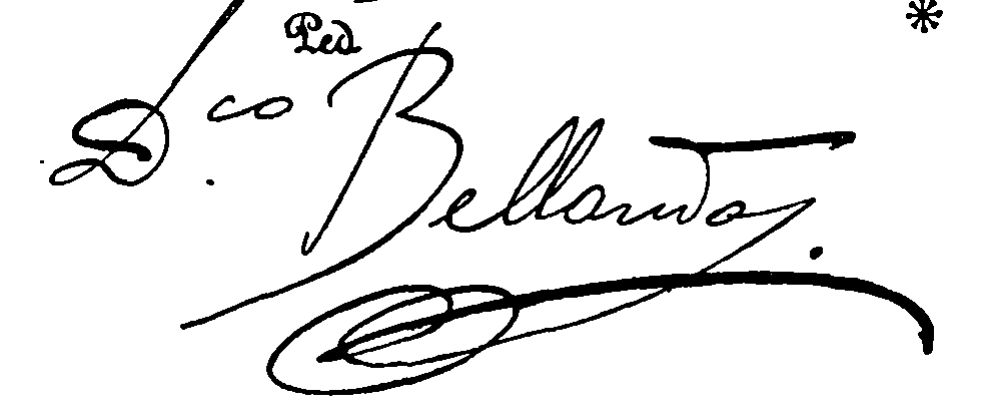
Domenico Bellando: signature

Domenico Bellando (1868-1922) was an Italian organist, teacher and composer, best known as a composer of music for church services, piano pieces and songs.

== Life ==
Domenico Bellando was born in Genoa in 1868. Details of his early musical education are obscure. At the age of 17 he was appointed organist of Genoa's Metropolitan Cathedral, a post he retained for 27 years. In 1904 he was appointed the head of organ studies at Genoa's Conservatorio Niccolò Paganini.

== Selected work ==
=== Choral ===
- 18?: Mass in the 6th tone, with interludes in F for organ/harmonium.
- 1908: Mass for two equal voices and organ/harmonium.
- 1911: 3 'O salutaris hostia' : soprano or tenor, solo.
- 1911: 6 'Tantum ergo' : 3 male voices.
- 1911: 'Tantum ergo' : medium voice, solo.

=== Orchestra ===
- 1916?: Inni [for small orchestra].

=== Organ ===
- (n.d.): Notturnino.
- 189?: Élévation.
- 1896: Offertory in G.
- 1897: Toccata.
- 19?: 6 pieces.

=== Organ/harmonium ===
- 18?: 40 versetti in various keys.
- 189?: 30 Interludes (20 in G, 10 in Gm).
- 19?: Andantino pastorale.

=== Organ/Piano ===
- 192?/repr.1931: Bethleem! : pastorale.

=== Piano ===
- (n.d.): Characteristic pieces (incl: Canzonetta; In sogno; L'arcolaio).
- (n.d.): Fiori di nozze : melody.
- (n.d.): Fogli d'album : 3 pieces.
- (n.d.): Fra i Monti : a sketch.
- (n.d.): Melodia romantica.
- 18?: A chiaroscuro : notturno.

=== Vocal ===
- 19? Amor novo : song, words by Mario Panizzardi.
