= Battle of La Higueruela =

1431 battle of the Reconquista

- Part of the Spanish Reconquista
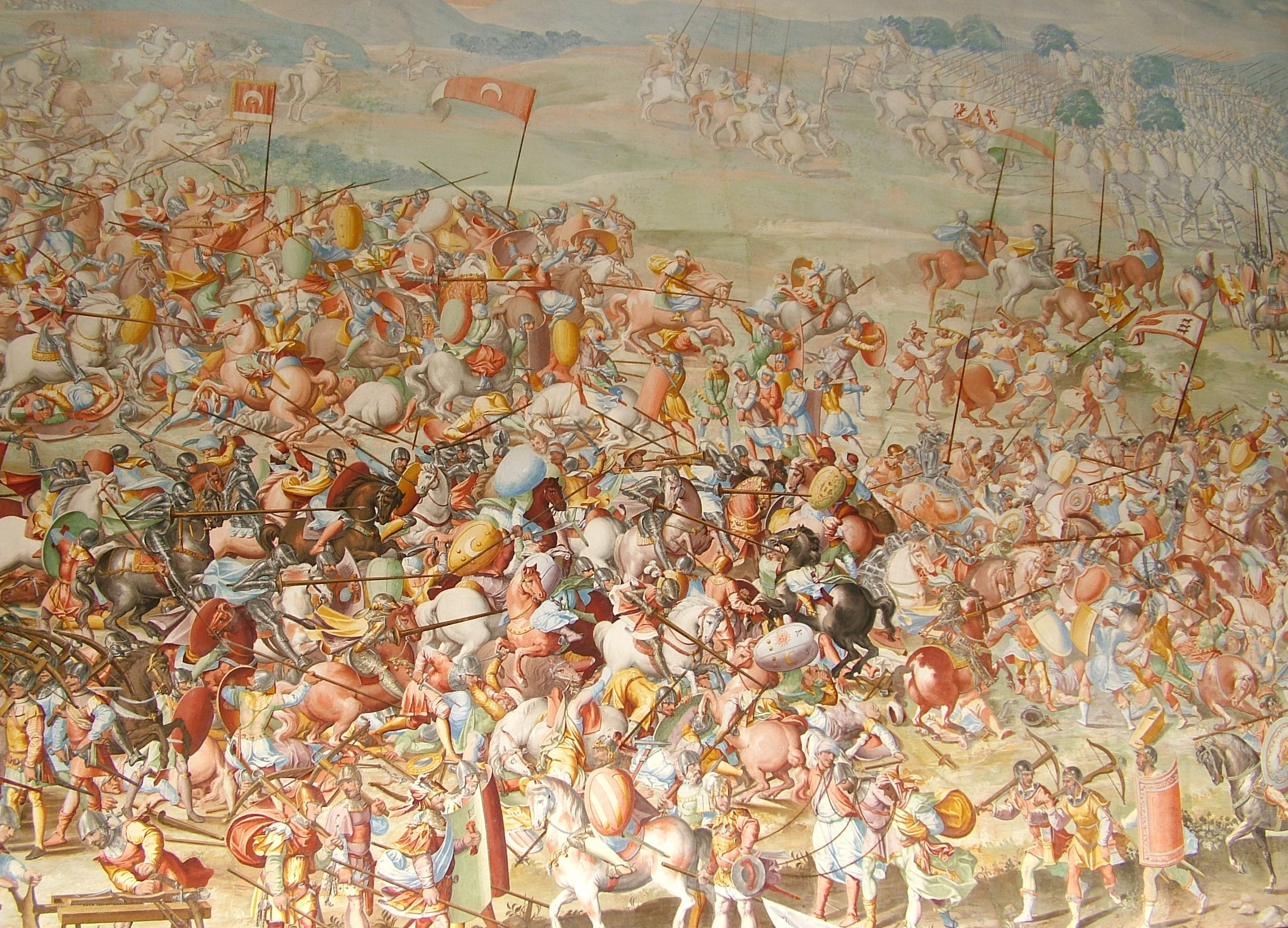
- The Battle of Higueruela as depicted in the Gallery of Battles at the Royal Monastery of San Lorenzo de El Escorial, Spain.
Date	1 July 1431
Location	Vega de Granada, Kingdom of Granada
Result	Castilian victory

Belligerents
Crown of Castile	Kingdom of Granada

Commanders and leaders
Álvaro de Luna	Muhammad IX

Strength
Unknown	Unknown

Casualties and losses
Unknown	Unknown

The Battle of La Higueruela (lit. 'Battle at the little fig tree') was fought in the vega of the river Genil near Granada on 1 July 1431 between the forces of John II of Castile, led by Álvaro de Luna, and troops loyal to Muhammed IX, Nasrid Sultan of Granada. The battle was a modest victory for the forces of Castile, with no territorial gain and failing to take Granada. Following this battle, John II of Castile installed Yusuf IV, grandson of Muhammed VI, as Sultan of Granada.

The battle is depicted in a famous series of fresco paintings by Fabrizio Castello, Orazio Cambiasi and Lazzaro Tavarone in the Gallery of Battles at the Royal Monastery of San Lorenzo de El Escorial.

== See also ==
- List of Castilian monarchs
- Nasrid dynasty

== Bibliography ==
- Echevarria, Ana (1999). The Fortress of Faith: The Attitude Towards Muslims in Fifteenth Century Spain. Brill Academic Publishers. ISBN 90-04-11232-4.
- Suárez Fernández, Luis (1989). Los Reyes Católicos: El tiempo de la Guerra de Granada. Ediciones Rialp. ISBN 84-321-2560-1.
- Houtsma, Martijn Theodoor (1987). E.J. Brill's First Encyclopaedia of Islam, 1913–1936. Vol. VI. Brill. ISBN 90-04-09792-9.
