= Niccolò Granello =

Spanish painter

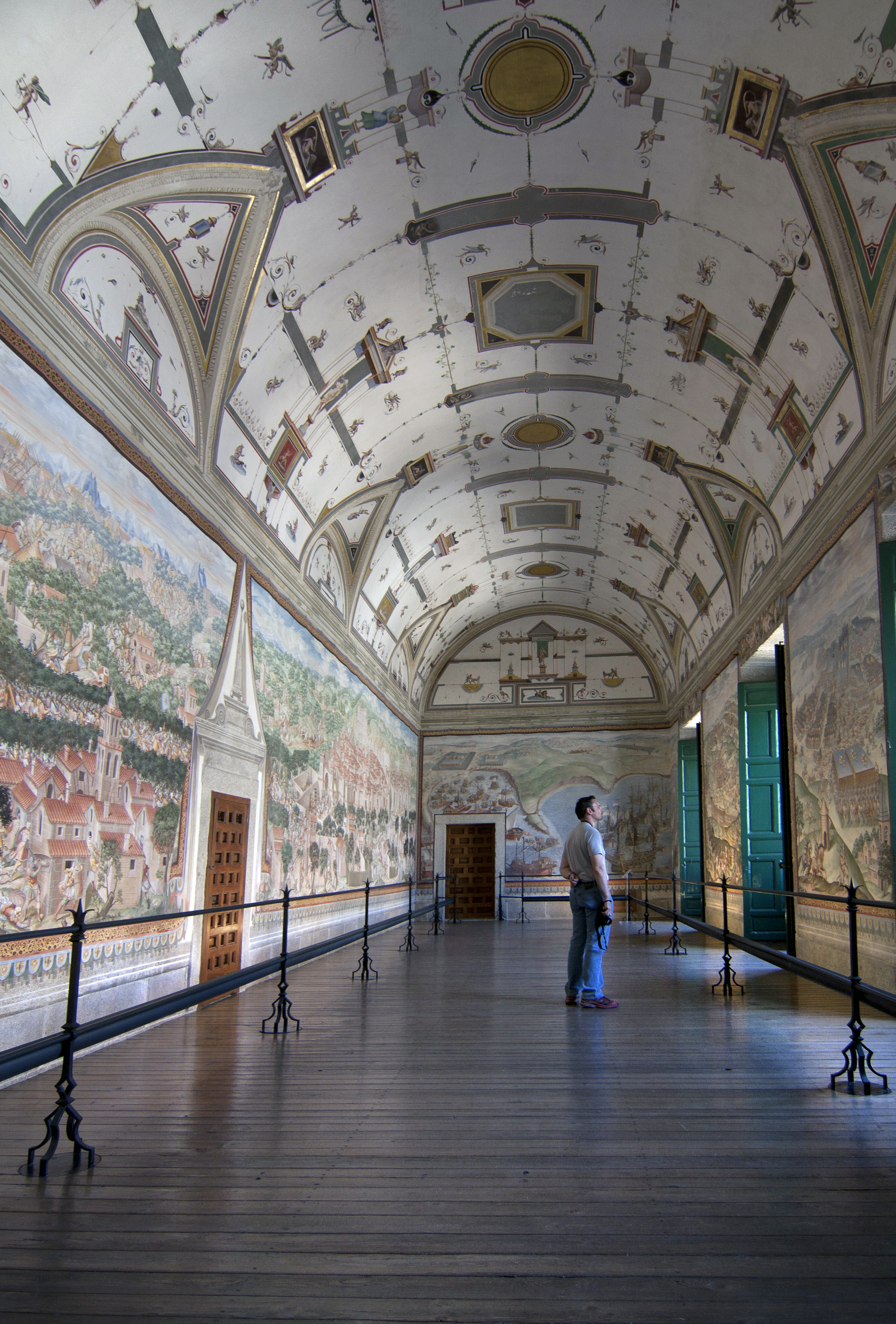
Gallery of Battles at the Royal Monastery of San Lorenzo de El Escorial. Fresco decoration carried out between 1585 and 1591 by a team of artists led by Niccolò Granello

Niccolò Granello (1553 - 30 November 1593), also Nicholas Granello and Granelo Nicolao, was an Italian painter established in Spain, specialized in frescos decorative painting grotesques.

Son of the first marriage of Giovanni Battista Castello ("Il Bergamasco"), Granello came to Spain while still a child, around 1567, accompanying his stepfather, and called by Álvaro de Bazán, 1st Marquis of Santa Cruz to work on his palace in Viso del Marqués. In 1571, his father died and he was appointed painter to the king for King Philip II of Spain. Granello performed some of the decoration of the golden tower of the old Royal Palace of Madrid, where he continued to work until 1575. He went to the Royal Monastery of San Lorenzo de El Escorial with his half-brother Fabrizio Castello and other team members who had accompanied his stepfather from Genoa, including brothers Gian Maria and Francesco da Urbino, Francesco da Viana and others, with whom he worked continuously in the decoration of vaults and some walls of various units of the basilica and monastery of El Escorial until his death.
