= Genoa Cathedral =

Cathedral in Genoa, Italy

Genoa Cathedral Cattedrale Metropolitana di San Lorenzo
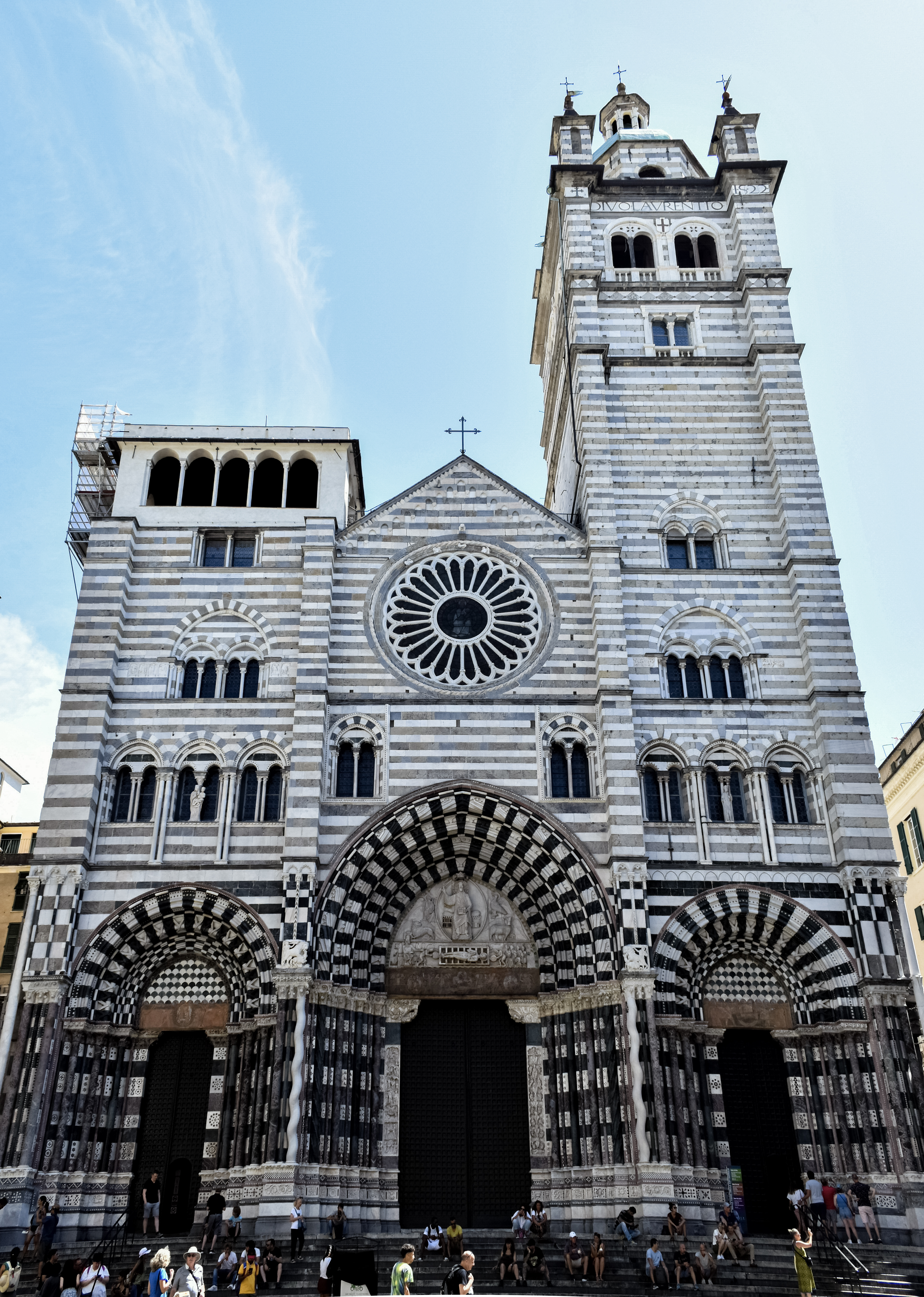
- West front of Genoa Cathedral.

Religion
- Affiliation: Roman Catholic Church
- Province: Archdiocese of Genoa
- Year consecrated: 1118

Location
- Location: Genoa, Italy
- Interactive map of Genoa Cathedral; Cattedrale Metropolitana di San Lorenzo
- Coordinates: 44°24′26.92″N 8°55′53.83″E

Architecture
- Style: Gothic
- Groundbreaking: 1110
- Completed: 17th century

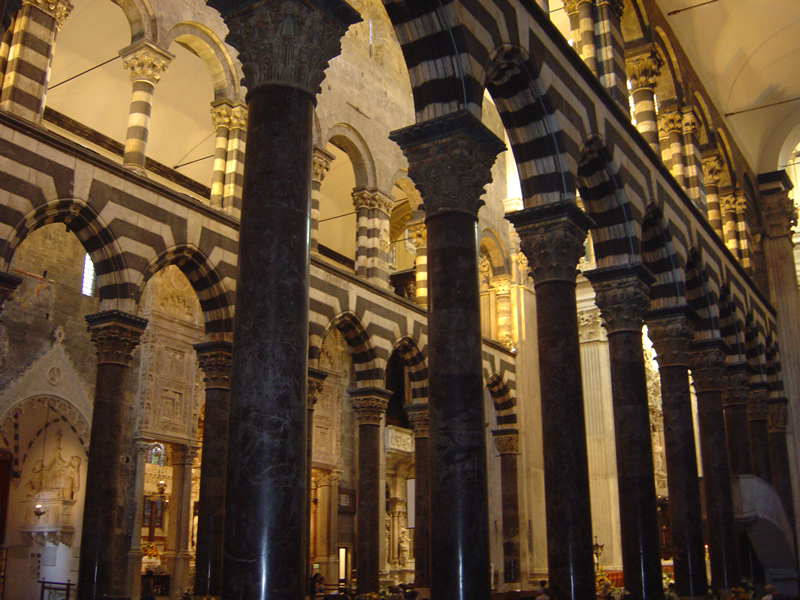
Interior of the cathedral

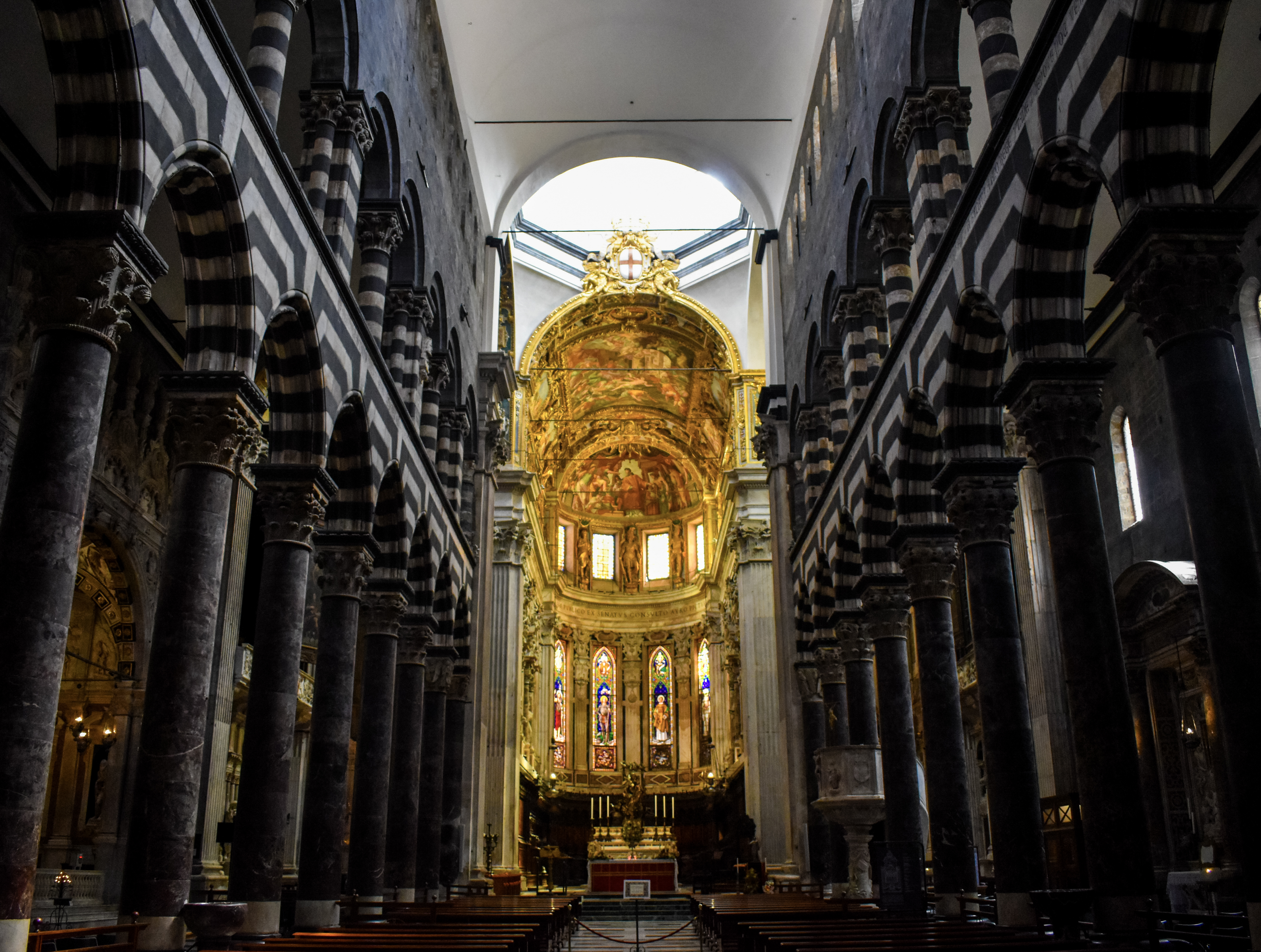
Nave

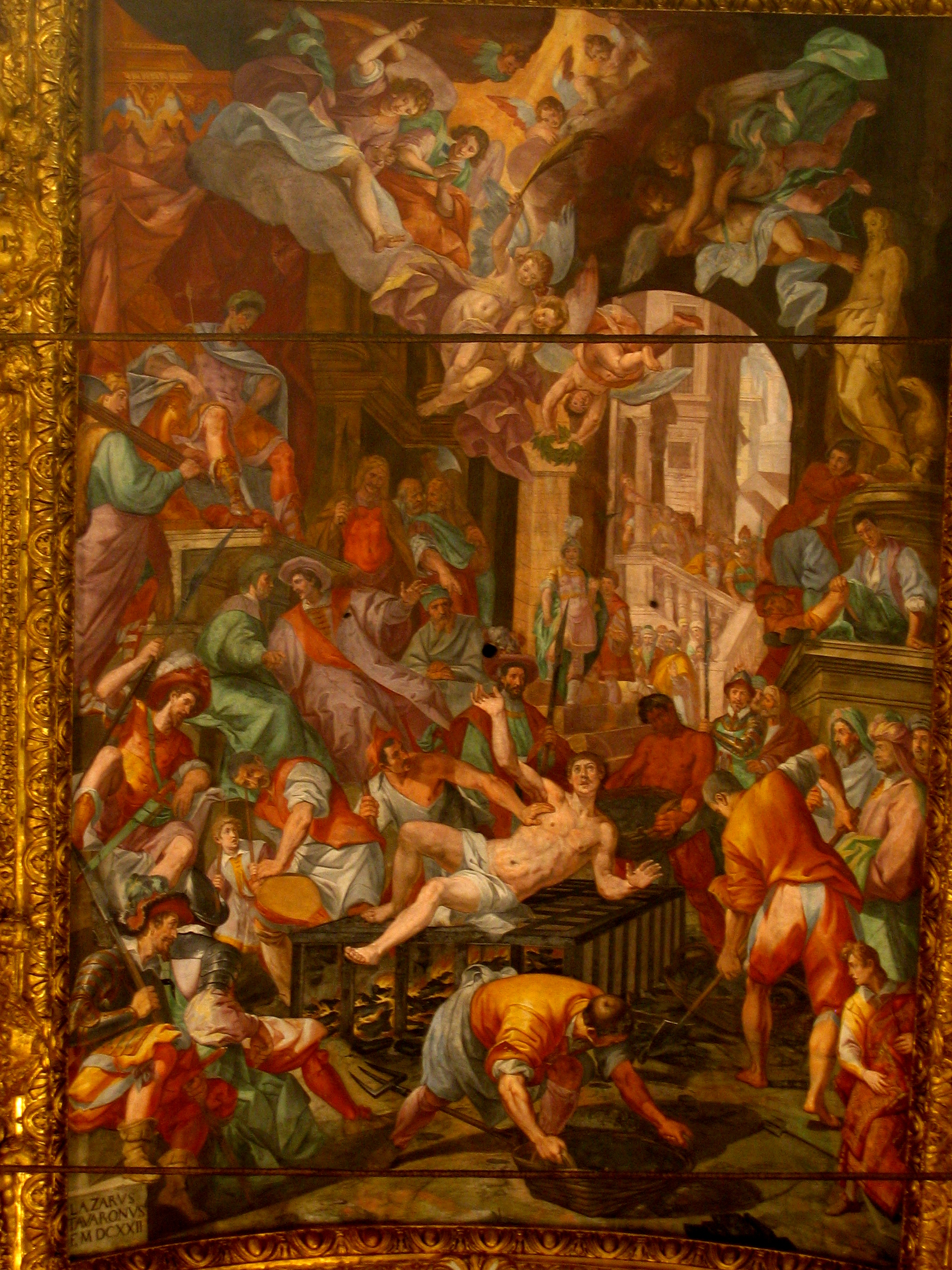
The Martyrdom of St. Lawrence, in the presbytery vault, by Lazzaro Tavarone

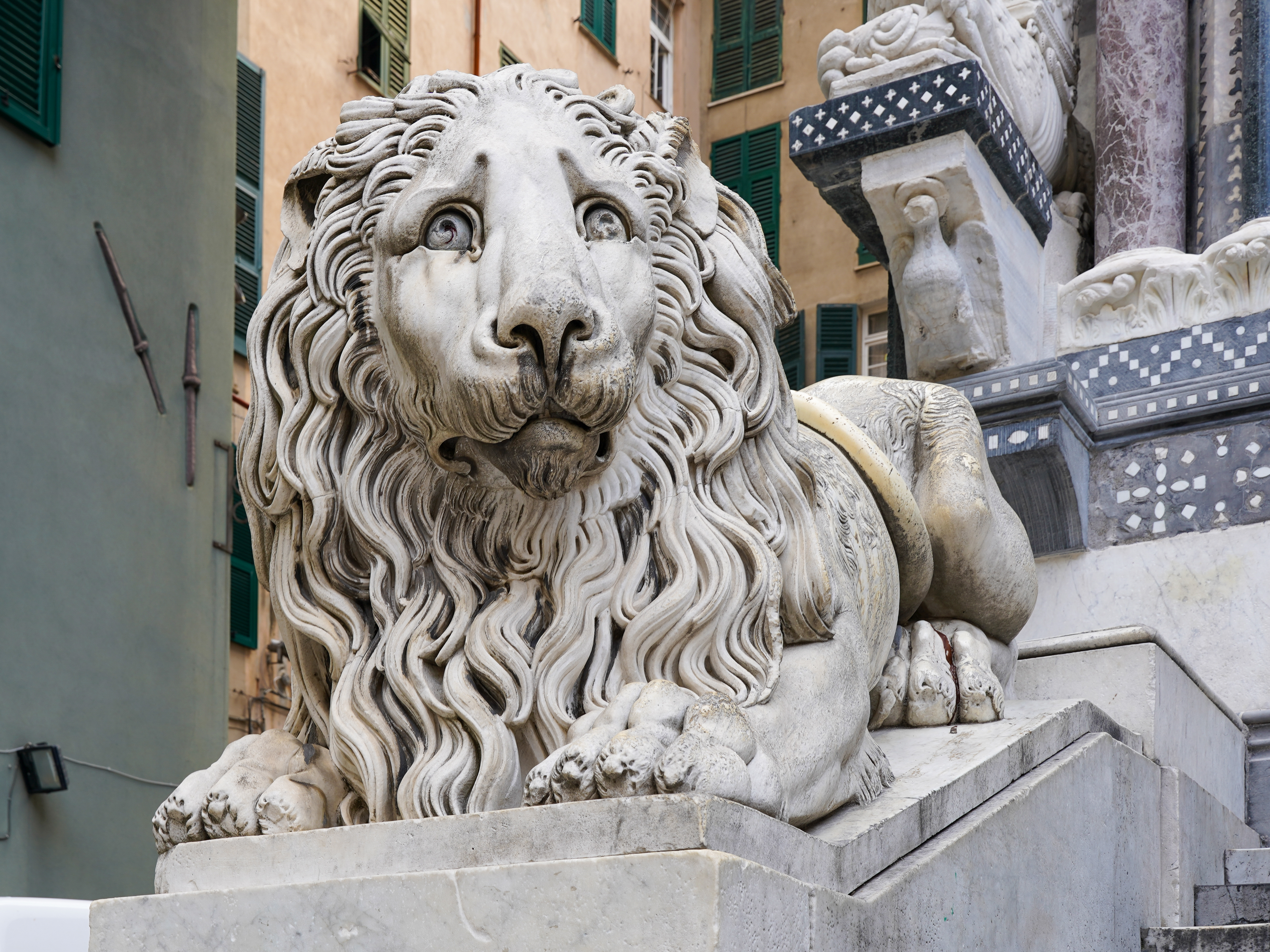
Lion on left of entrance stairs

Genoa Cathedral or Metropolitan Cathedral of Saint Lawrence (Italian: Duomo di Genova, Cattedrale di San Lorenzo) is a Roman Catholic cathedral in the Italian city of Genoa. It is dedicated to Saint Lawrence (San Lorenzo), and is the seat of the Archbishop of Genoa. The cathedral was consecrated by Pope Gelasius II in 1118 and was built between the twelfth century and the fourteenth century as fundamentally a medieval building, with some later additions. Secondary naves and side covers are of Romanesque style and the main facade is Gothic from the early thirteenth century, while capitals and columns with interior corridors date from the early fourteenth century. The bell tower and dome were built in the sixteenth century.

== History ==
Excavations under the pavement and in the area in front of today's west front have brought to light walls and pavements of Roman age as well as pre-Christian sarcophagi, suggesting the existence of a burial ground in the site. Later a church devoted to the Twelve Apostles was built, which was in turn flanked and replaced by a new cathedral dedicated to Saint Lawrence, in Romanesque style. Money came from the successful enterprises of the Genoese fleets in the Crusades.

The first cathedral, now the basilica of St. Syrus, was founded probably in the 5th or 6th century AD, devoted to Saint Syrus, bishop of Genoa. The transferring of the cathedral favored the urbanization of the zone that, with the construction of its walls in 1155, and the fusion of the three ancient city nuclei (castrum, civitas and burgus), became the heart of the city. The piazza, in the absence of other public squares and centers of lay power, was the city's only public space for the whole of the Middle Ages. The cathedral was consecrated by Pope Gelasius II in 1118, and from 1133 had archiepiscopal rank. After the fire of 1296, provoked by fights between Guelphs and Ghibellines, the building was partly restored and partly rebuilt. Between 1307 and 1312 the façade was completed, the inner colonnades rebuilt with capitals and matronei added. The Romanesque structures remained pretty untouched, and frescoes of religious subject were also added.

Various altars and chapels have been erected between the 14th and 15th centuries. The small loggia on the north-eastern tower of the façade was built in 1455; the opposite one, in Mannerist style, is from 1522. In 1550 the Perugian architect Galeazzo Alessi was commissioned by the city magistrates to plan the reconstruction of the entire building; however, he executed only the covering of the nave and aisles, the pavement, the dome and the apse.

The construction of the cathedral finished in the 17th century. The dome and the medieval parts were restored in 1894–1900. The present 7 bells are tuned in the major scale of C.

Among the artworks inside the church are ceiling frescoes in a chapel on the north by Luca Cambiaso; a Crucifixion with Saints (St. Sebastian's Vision) by Barocci; in front of the organ is an Episode from the life of St. Lawrence by Giovanni Andrea Ansaldo; the ceiling fresco in the presbytery of the Martyrdom of St Lawrence was painted by Lazzaro Tavarone; and an Assumption of the Virgin (1914) by Gaetano Previati. The church also contains 14th-century frescoes in the Byzantine style in the main portal. Sculptural works include a statue in the chapel of St. John by Domenico Gagini; a Virgin and a St. John the Baptist by Andrea Sansovino. Other works include works by Matteo Civitali, Taddeo Carlone, and Giacomo and Guglielmo Della Porta.

The Museum of the Treasury lies under the cathedral and holds a collection of jewellery and silverware from 9 AD up to the present. Among the most important pieces are the Sacro Catino brought by Guglielmo Embriaco after the conquest of Caesarea and supposed to be the chalice used by Christ during the Last Supper; the Cassa Processionale del Corpus Domini; and the Zaccaria Cross, a Byzantine reliquary that holds supposed relics of the True Cross. Dating back to the 9th and 13th centuries, it was originally part of the treasure of the archbishops of Ephesus and was later brought back to Genoa by the Zaccaria family, who donated it to the cathedral.

=== War damage ===
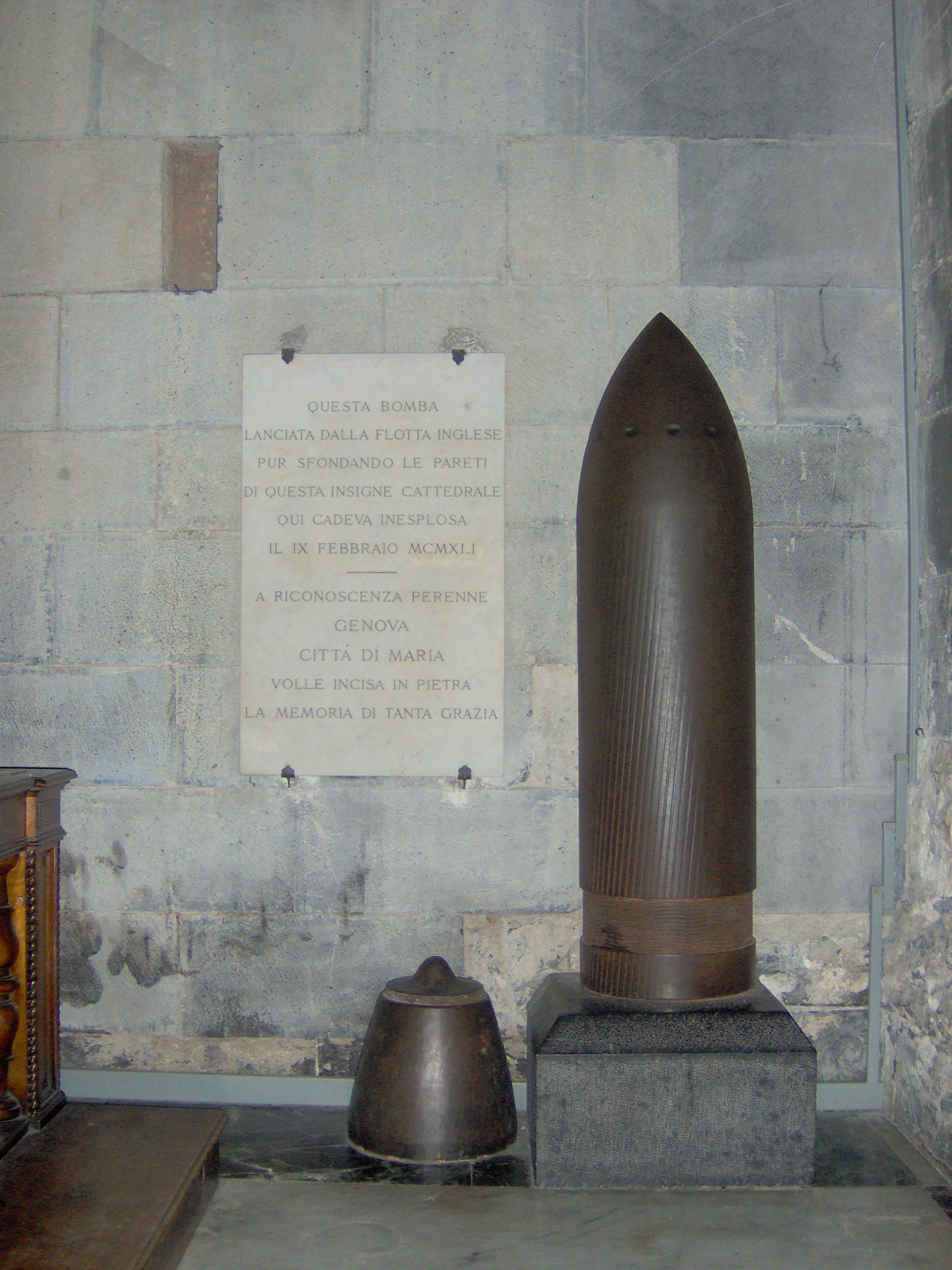
Armour-piercing shell fired on 9 February 1941 in the nave of Genoa cathedral.

The cathedral had a fortunate escape on February 9, 1941, when the city was being shelled as part of Operation Grog. Because of a crew error the British battleship HMS Malaya fired a 381 mm (15.0 in) armour-piercing shell into the south-eastern corner of the nave. The relatively soft material failed to detonate the fuse and the shell is still there.

The inscription, which gives thanks for the cathedral's escape reads:
QUESTA BOMBA LANCIATA DALLA FLOTTA INGLESE PUR SFONDANDO LE PARETI DI QUESTA INSIGNE CATTEDRALE QUI CADEVA INESPLOSA IL IX FEBBRAIO MCMXLI
A RICONOSCENZA PERENNE GENOVA CITTÀ DI MARIA VOLLE INCISA IN PIETRA LA MEMORIA DI TANTA GRAZIA
(This bomb, launched by the British Navy, though breaking through the walls of this great cathedral, fell here unexploded on February 9, 1941. In perpetual gratitude, Genoa, the City of Mary, desired to engrave in stone, the memory of such grace.)

== See also ==
- Domenico Bellando: cathedral organist from 1885–1912.
- List of cathedrals
- Roman Catholic Archdiocese of Genoa
- 16th-century Western domes
