= Luca Cambiaso =

Italian painter (1527–1585)

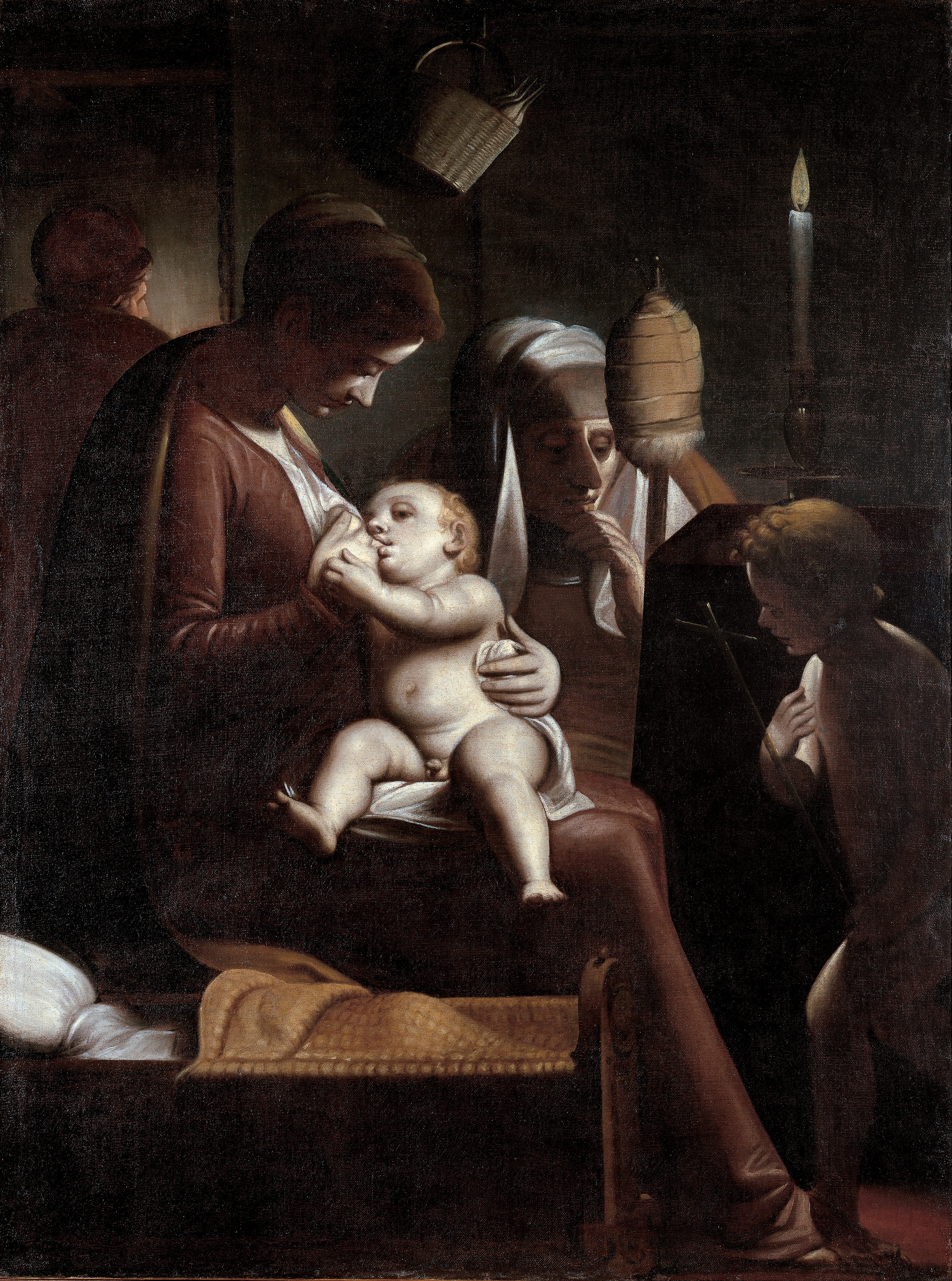
Madonna of the Candle

Luca Cambiaso (also known as Luca Cambiasi and Luca Cangiagio (being Cangiaxo [kaŋˈdʒaːʒu] the surname in Ligurian); 18 November 1527 – 6 September 1585) was an Italian painter and draughtsman and the leading artist in Genoa in the 16th century. He is considered the founder of the Genoese school, who established the local tradition of historical fresco painting through his many decorations of Genoese churches and palaces. He produced a number of poetic night scenes. He was a prolific draughtsman who sometimes reduced figures to geometric (even cubic) forms. He was familiarly known as Lucchetto da Genova.

== Life ==
Cambiaso was born in Moneglia, then part of the Republic of Genoa, the son of a painter named Giovanni Cambiaso.

Cambiaso was precocious, and at the age of fifteen, he painted, along with his father, some subjects from Ovid's Metamorphoses on the facade of a house in Genoa. In 1544, at the age of seventeen, he was involved in the decoration of the Palazzo Doria, now the Prefettura, perhaps working with Marcantonio Calvi, a painter of his father's generation. He aided in the vault decoration of the church of San Matteo, in collaboration with Giovanni Battista Castello. His Resurrection and Transfiguration altarpieces for San Bartolomeo degli Armeni date from c. 1560. In 1563, he painted a Resurrection for San Giovanni Battista in Montalto Ligure.

This was followed by frescoes for the Villa Imperiale at Genoa-Turalba (also called the Palazzo Imperiali Terralba) with a Rape of the Sabines (c. 1565) and the Palazzo Meridiana (formerly Grimaldi; also in 1565). In the Capella Lercari of the Duomo di San Lorenzo, Cambiaso frescoed a Presentation and Marriage of the Virgin in 1569, the remainder of the chapel by Castello.

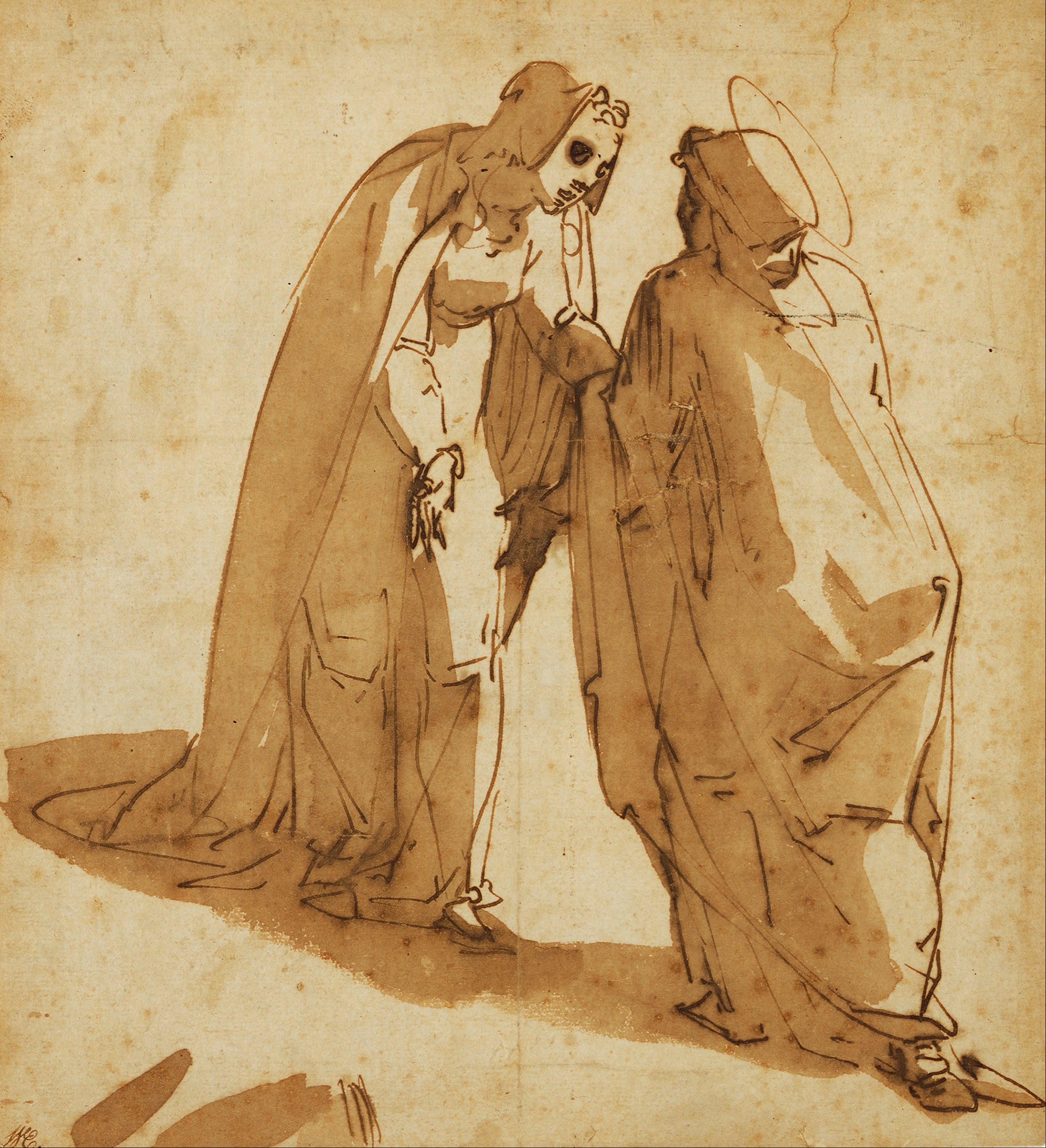
The Visitation

In 1583, Cambiaso accepted an invitation from Philip II to complete for the Escorial a series of frescoes begun by Castello; and the 1911 Encyclopædia states the principal reason for travelling to Spain was that he hoped royal influence would gain favour with the Vatican for his marriage plans, but this failed. In the Escorial, he executed a Paradise on the vaulting of the church, with a multitude of figures. For this picture, he received 2,000 ducats, probably the largest sum that had, up to that time, ever been given for a single work. His paintings in Spain hew to a strict religious theme.

His son Orazio Cambiaso became a painter. Other followers from Genoa include Giovanni Andrea Ansaldo, Simone Barabino, Giulio Benso, Battista and Bernardo Castello, Giovanni Battista Paggi, Francesco Spezzini, and Lazzaro Tavarone.

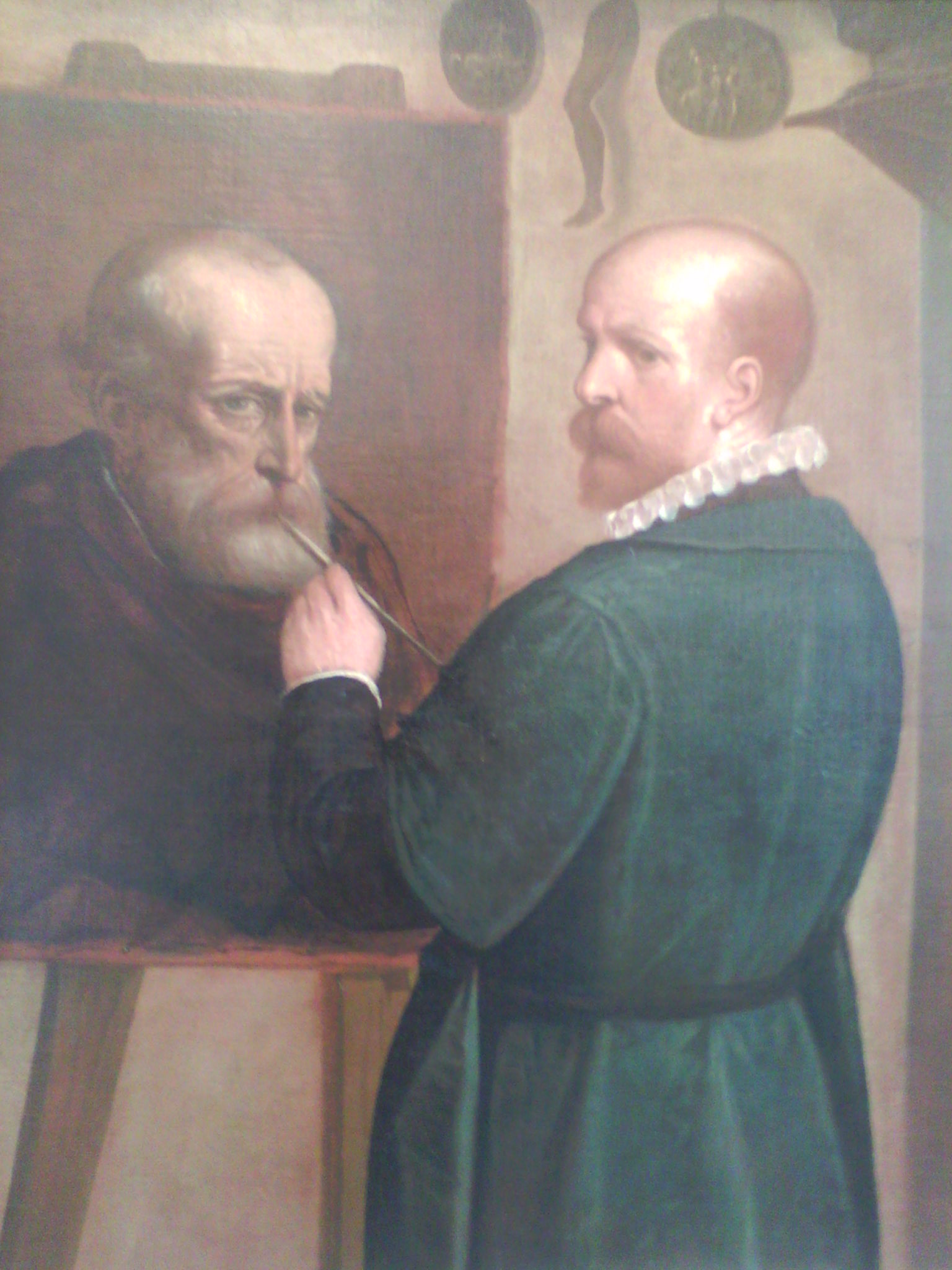
Self-portrait of the painter who paints the portrait of his father Giovanni

== Style and output ==
Cambiaso had an ardent fancy, and was a bold designer in a Raphaelesque mode. His main influences are said to have been Correggio and the Late Renaissance Venetian school. His extreme facility astonished the Spanish painters. It is said that Philip II, watching one day with pleasure the off-hand zest with which Cambiaso was painting a head of a laughing child, was allowed the further surprise of seeing the laugh changed, by a touch or two upon the lips, into a weeping expression. The artist painted sometimes with a brush in each hand, and with a certainty equalling or transcending that even of Tintoretto. His fresco technique was very spontaneous, and he used small drawings to create full-size sketches on the walls without the aid of cartoons.

Cambiaso is best represented in Genoa. In the church of San Giorgio is a canvas of the Martyrdom of San Giorgio; Santa Maria da Carignano houses a Pietà, containing his own portrait and (according to tradition) that of his beloved sister-in-law.

He painted notable nocturnes, including an Adoration of the Shepherds (1570) and the so-called Madonna of the Candle (1575). The former painting appears inspired by Correggio's Nativity.

Cambiaso was a prolific draftsman. In his early drawings, Cambiaso showed a preference for bold foreshortenings and exaggerated gestures. In the mid-1560s, he began to draw in a simplified, geometric style that may have been inspired by similar works by Albrecht Dürer and other German artists.

== Sources ==
- Freedberg, Sydney J. (1993). Pelican History of Art (ed.). Painting in Italy, 1500-1600. Penguin Books Ltd. pp. 600–604.
- Luca Cambiaso, la vita e le opere, edited by Bertina Suida Manning and William Suida. Milano: Ceschina, 1957.
- Luca Cambiaso, 1527-1585, edited by Jonathan Bober. Milano: Silvana Editoriale, 2006. Catalogue of an exhibition held at the Blanton Museum of Art, University of Texas at Austin, 15 Sept. 2006-14 Jan. 2007, and at the Palazzo ducale, Genoa, Mar. 3-8 July 2007.
- Mary Newcome, "Luca Cambiaso, Austin and Genoa," review in The Burlington Magazine, Vol. 148, No. 1245 (Dec., 2006), pp. 878–880.
- Edward J. Olszewski, "Drawings by Luca Cambiaso as a Late Renaissance Model of Invenzione," Cleveland Studies in the History of Art, Vol. 5 (2000), pp. 20–41.
- Frederick A. Sweet, "Venus and Cupid by Luca Cambiaso," Bulletin of the Art Institute of Chicago, Vol. 37, No. 1 (Jan., 1943), pp. 1–3.
