= Giovanni Battista Castello =

Italian painter

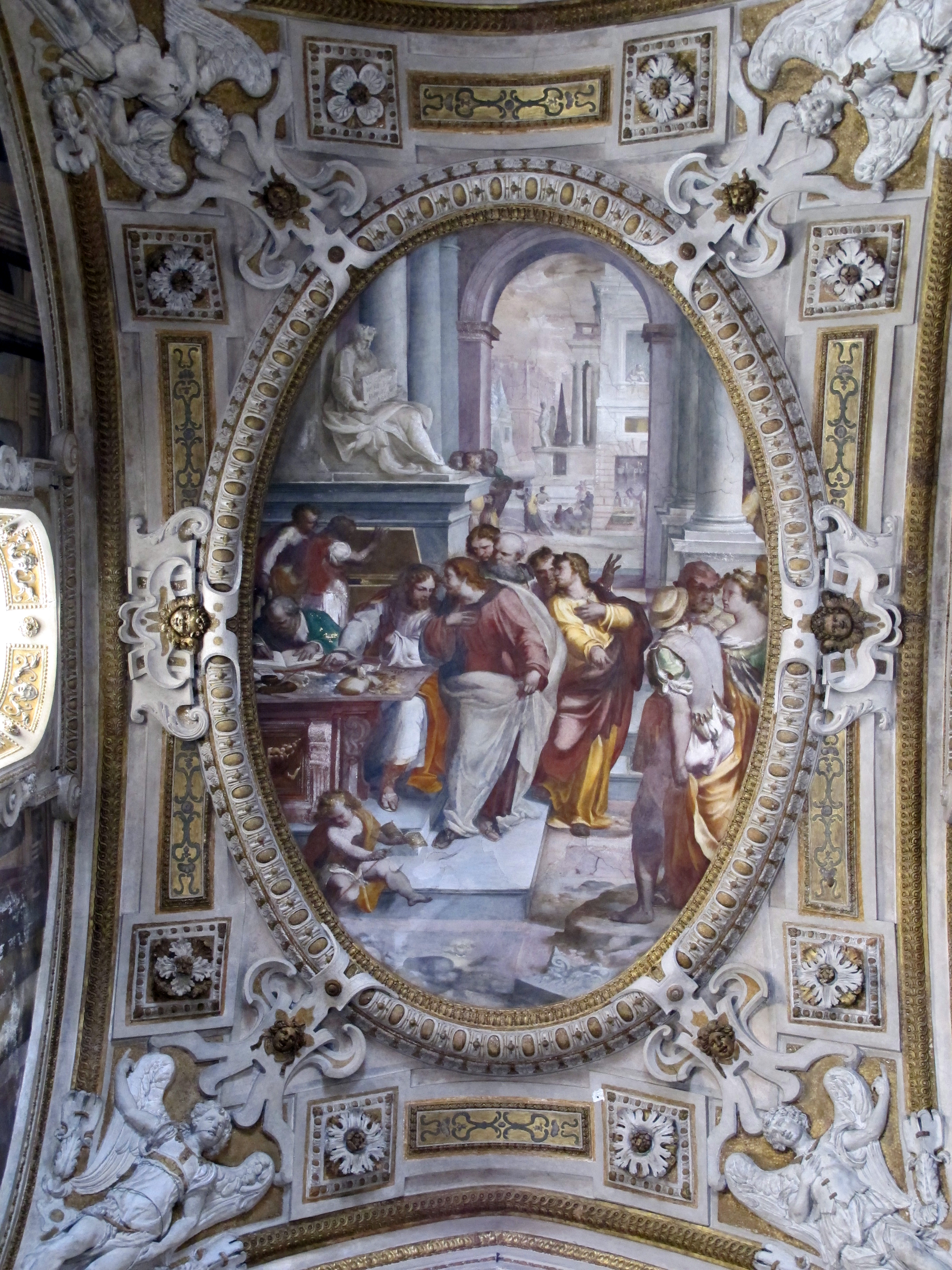
Vault with the Vocation of Saint Matthew

Giovanni Battista Castello (1500 or 1509–1569 or 1579) was an Italian historical painter.

Born in Gandino near Bergamo, he is ordinarily termed Il Bergamasco to distinguish him from the other painter (of miniatures) with the identical name from the school of Genoa. His best-known works are the paintings on the vault of the Basilica della Santissima Annunziata del Vastato. He was an architect and sculptor as well as painter.

When young, he apprenticed with Aurelio Buso of Crema, a pupil of Polidoro da Caravaggio. He was sponsored in Genoa by Tobia Pallavicino and sent to Rome for some years. He returned to decorate the Palazzo Pallavicino and the church of San Marcellino. He painted the Martyrdom of St. Sebastian in the monastery of San Sebastiano. Along with his friend Luca Cambiaso, Castello was commissioned by the Duke Grimaldi to decorate the ceiling of the choir of the Nunziata di Portoria in Genoa, with a fresco of Christ as judge of the world. Castello and Cambiaso shared other projects, including work in a chapel for the Duomo di San Lorenzo.

He decorated rooms of the Villa Lanzi, Gorlago, near Bergamo, with scenes from the Iliad.

In 1567, he was invited to Madrid to become a painter and architect to Philip II. He also executed some works in the Escorial, and died holding the office of architect of the royal palaces, including the Pardo Palace. As an architect, he is supposed to have remodelled the church of San Matteo in Genoa and to have designed the imperial palace at Campetto. In 1568, he did the first sketch for the decoration of the Real, the biggest galley of its time. He died at Madrid in 1569 or 1579.
