= Carboni =

Carboni is an Italian surname. Notable people with the surname include:

- Amedeo Carboni (born 1965), Italian footballer
- Andrea Carboni (born 2001), Italian footballer
- Berardo Carboni (born 1975), Italian director
- Bernardino Carboni (1726–?), Italian decorator and wood sculptor of the Baroque period
- Edvige Carboni (1880–1952), Italian mystic, venerated in the Roman Catholic Church
- Ezequiel Alejo Carboni (born 1979), Argentine footballer
- Francesco Carboni (1584–1635), Italian baroque period artist
- Franco Carboni (born 2003), Argentine footballer
- Gaetano Carboni (born 1955), Italian former swimmer
- Giacomo Carboni (1889–1973), Italian general
- Giovanni Carboni (born 1995), Italian cyclist
- Giovanni Battista Carboni (1725–1790), Italian sculptor, painter and writer
- Giovanni Bernardo Carboni (1614–1683), Italian artist
- Guido Carboni (born 1963), Italian footballer
- Jean-Michel Carboni (born 1955), Businessman and CEO (Engie group)
- Jérémie Carboni (born 1980), French producer, director and political advisor
- Leonardo Carboni (born 1984), Argentine footballer
- Luca Carboni (born 1962), Italian musician
- Luigi Carboni (16th century), Italian painter of the late-Renaissance period
- Nicole Carboni (born 1991), Costa Rican-American fashion model, television and athlete
- Paola Renata Carboni (1908–1927), Italian mystic
- Raffaello Carboni (1817–1875), Italian writer and revolutionary
- Roberto Eduardo Carboni (born 1985), Argentine footballer
- Romolo Carboni (1911–1999), Italian prelate of the Catholic Church
- Valentín Carboni (born 2005), Argentine footballer
- Yrius Carboni (born 1986), Brazilian footballer
