= Bernardo Strozzi =

Italian painter (c. 1581–1644)

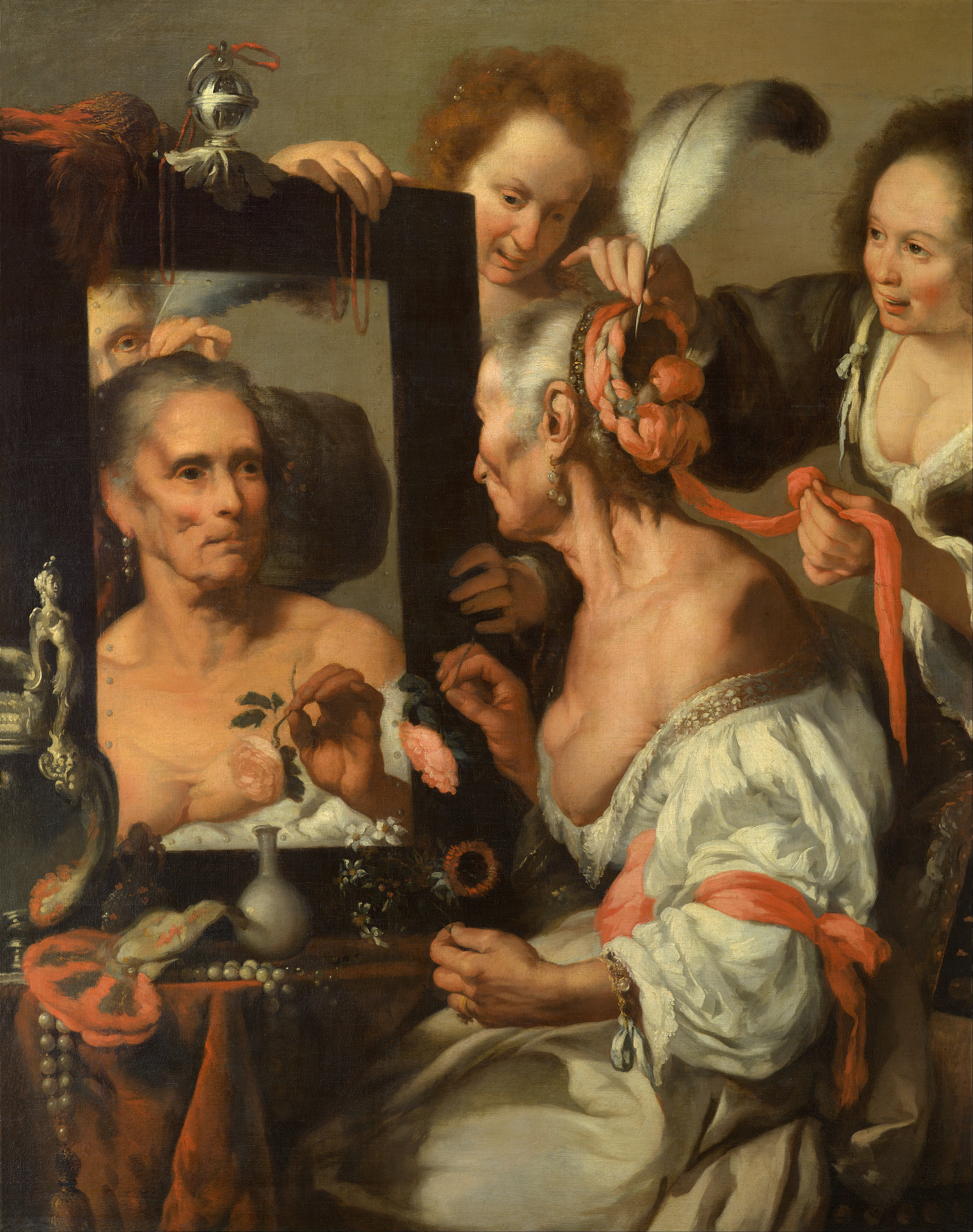
Vanitas or The old Coquette

Bernardo Strozzi, named il Cappuccino and il Prete Genovese (c. 1581 – 2 August 1644), was an Italian Baroque artist who was a painter and engraver. A canvas and fresco artist, his wide subject range included history, allegorical, genre, and portrait paintings as well as still lifes. Born and initially mainly active in Genoa, he worked in Venice in the latter part of his career. His work exercised considerable influence on artistic developments in both cities. He is considered a principal founder of the Baroque style in Venetian painting. His powerful art stands out by its rich and glowing colour and broad, energetic brushstrokes.

== Life ==
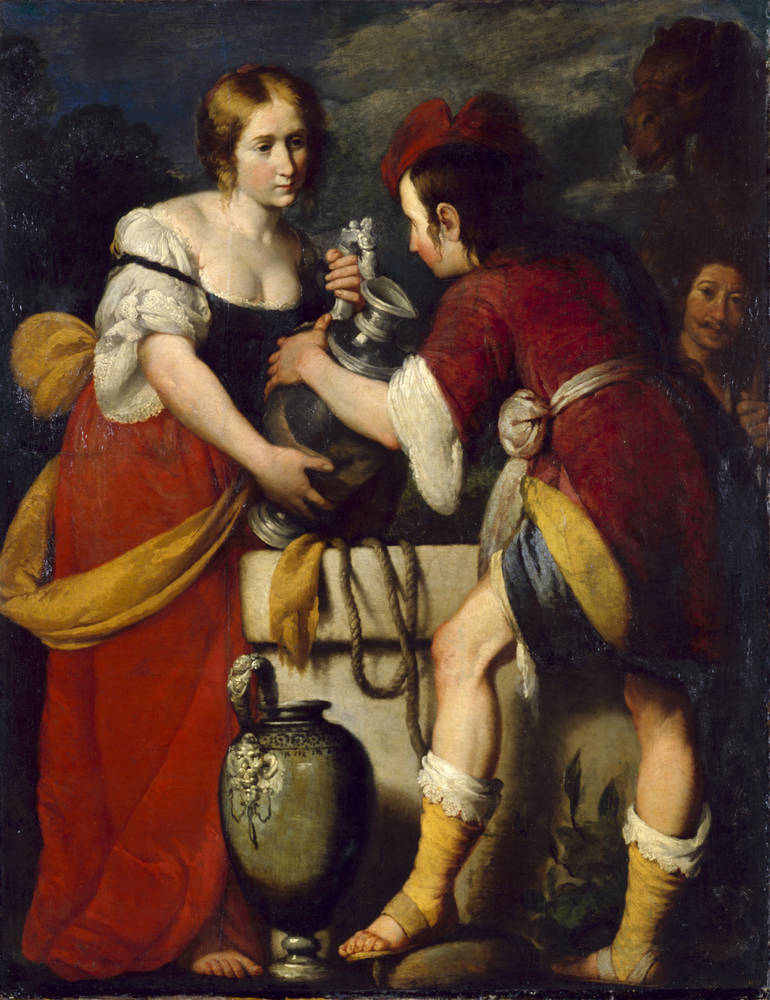
Rebecca and Eliezer at the Well

Strozzi was born in Genoa. He is not believed to be related to the Florentine Strozzi family. Bernardo Strozzi initially trained in the workshop of Cesare Corte, a minor Genoese painter whose work reflected the late Mannerist style of Luca Cambiaso. He subsequently joined the workshop of Pietro Sorri, an innovative Sienese painter residing in Genoa from 1596 to 1598. Sorri is credited with leading Strozzi away from the artificial elegance of Cambiaso's late Mannerist style towards a greater naturalism. In 1598, at the age of 17, Strozzi joined a Capuchin monastery, a reformist offshoot of the Franciscan order. During this time he likely painted devotional compositions for the order, including many scenes with St. Francis of Assisi whose life and deeds formed the inspiration of the order. While a friar of the Capuchin monastery of San Barnaba, he came to be called by the nickname "il Cappuccino" ("the Capuchin"). Since he was allowed to abandon his Capuchin habit for that of a priest, he was also known as il prete genovese (the 'genovese priest').

When his father died around 1608, Strozzi left the Capuchin monastery to care for his mother and unmarried sister. He supported his family through his paintings. Strozzi's career took off during the next decade and Genoa's powerful Doria and Centurione families became his patrons. Bernardo Strozzi was able to secure commissions for grand mural decorations, which culminated in the important frescoes in the choir of the San Domenico church, commissioned by members of the Doria family, Giovanni Carlo and his cousin Giovanni Stefano. The work is now almost entirely destroyed and is only known through a preparatory oil bozzetto for the vault depicting ‘’The Vision of Saint Dominic (Paradise)’’, located at the Museo dell’Accademia Ligustica in Genoa. It is believed that from the end of April until the end of July 1625 he resided in Rome, to which he had been summoned by the friars of his order to support their attempt to create a stronger Capuchin presence in the papal city.

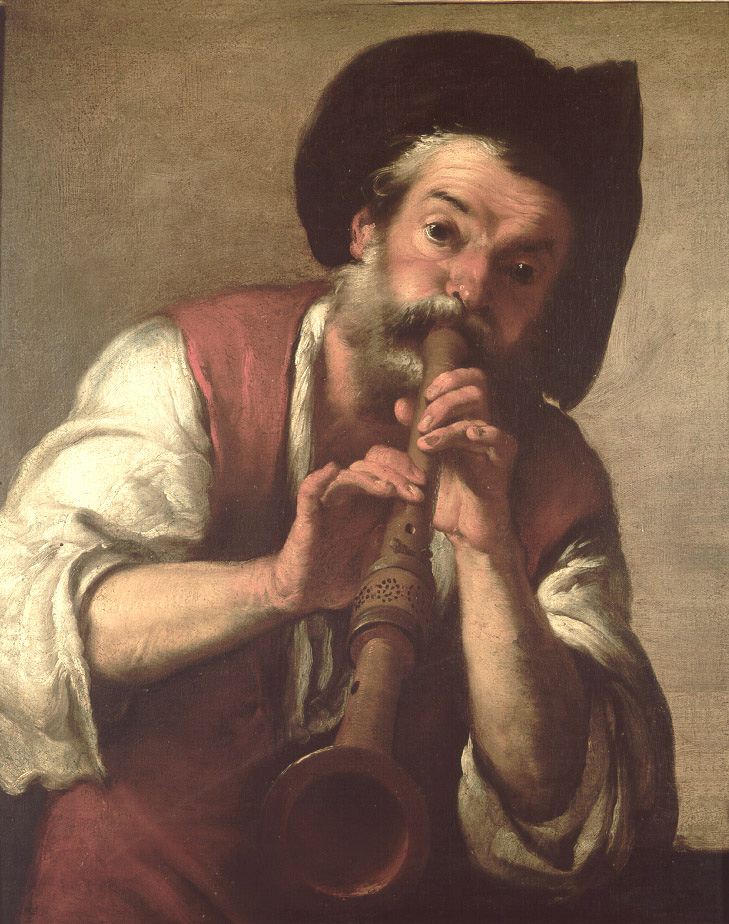
The flute player

From the year 1625 Strozzi's relationship with the Capuchin order became strained. The order accused him of having committed a no longer known act that had purportedly caused 'disgrace to his sacred habit'. Some authors state that the act was the illegal practice of painting beyond the convent's walls. It is known that his Capuchin superiors condemned the secular paintings he was making such as his portraits and genre paintings. The conflict came to a head in 1630 when Strozzi refused to go back to the monastery following his mother's death and his sister's marriage. His superiors then had him imprisoned. His arrest lasted for about 17 to 18 months.

By 1632–1633 the artist had reemerged in Venice where he had been allowed to work and live. Strozzi was able to build a strong reputation within two years, despite not being a native Venetian. He gradually gained recognition as one of the leading artists of his age. The Doge of Venice Francesco Erizzo became one of his most prominent patrons. Strozzi likely painted the Doge's portrait soon after he arrived in Venice. Other patrons included the Catholic Cardinal and Patriarch of Venice Federico Baldissera Bartolomeo Cornaro and some members of the prominent Grimani family, as well as prominent Venetian artists such as the musicians Claudio Monteverdi and Barbara Strozzi and the poet Giulio Strozzi (it is unclear whether the two families were closely related). The artist worked on important public commissions. He realised altarpieces in the Chiesa degli Incurabili and the Chiesa di San Nicolò da Tolentino and painted a tondo representing an Allegory of Sculpture for the reading room of the Biblioteca Marciana. Strozzi was allowed the use of the honorific Monsignor although he remained known generally under the popular il prete genovese.

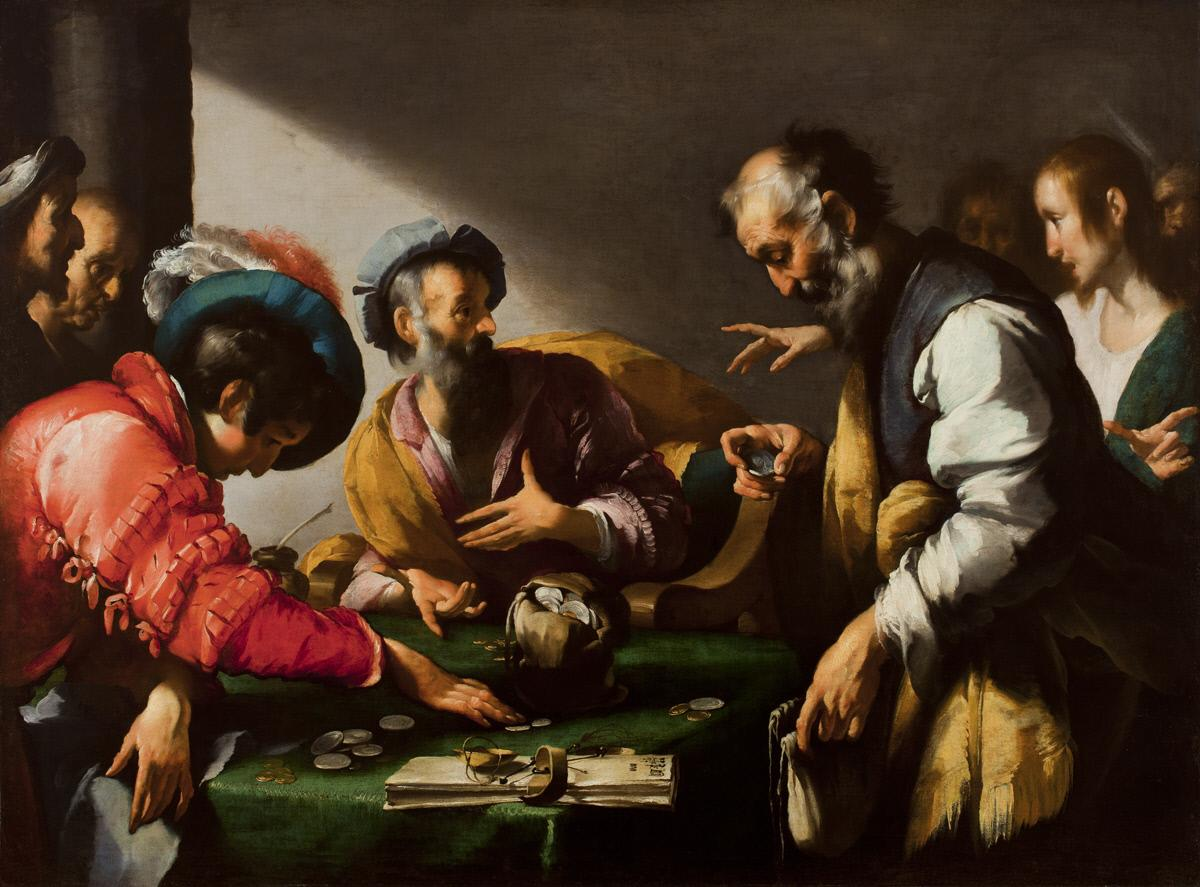
Calling of St Matthew

His many pupils and the large number of his paintings, which often appear in many versions, point to his reliance on the help of several assistants and the operation of a sizable workshop. Francesco Durello, Antonio Travi, Ermanno Stroiffi, Clemente Bocciardo, Giovanni Eismann, Giuseppe Catto and Giovanni Andrea de Ferrari are recorded as his pupils.

At the end of his career he also worked as an engineer. The artist died in Venice in 1644.

== Work ==
=== General ===
Bernardo Strozzi was a versatile and prolific artist who worked on canvas and as a fresco artist. He treated a wide range of subjects including history, allegories, genre scenes and portraits. He also worked as a still life painter and various of his compositions include still life elements. Religious compositions make up the majority of his works.

Although also active as a fresco artist, he achieved greater success with his canvas paintings. Many of his paintings appear in multiple autograph copies produced by Strozzi himself as was customary at the time.

=== Stylistic development ===
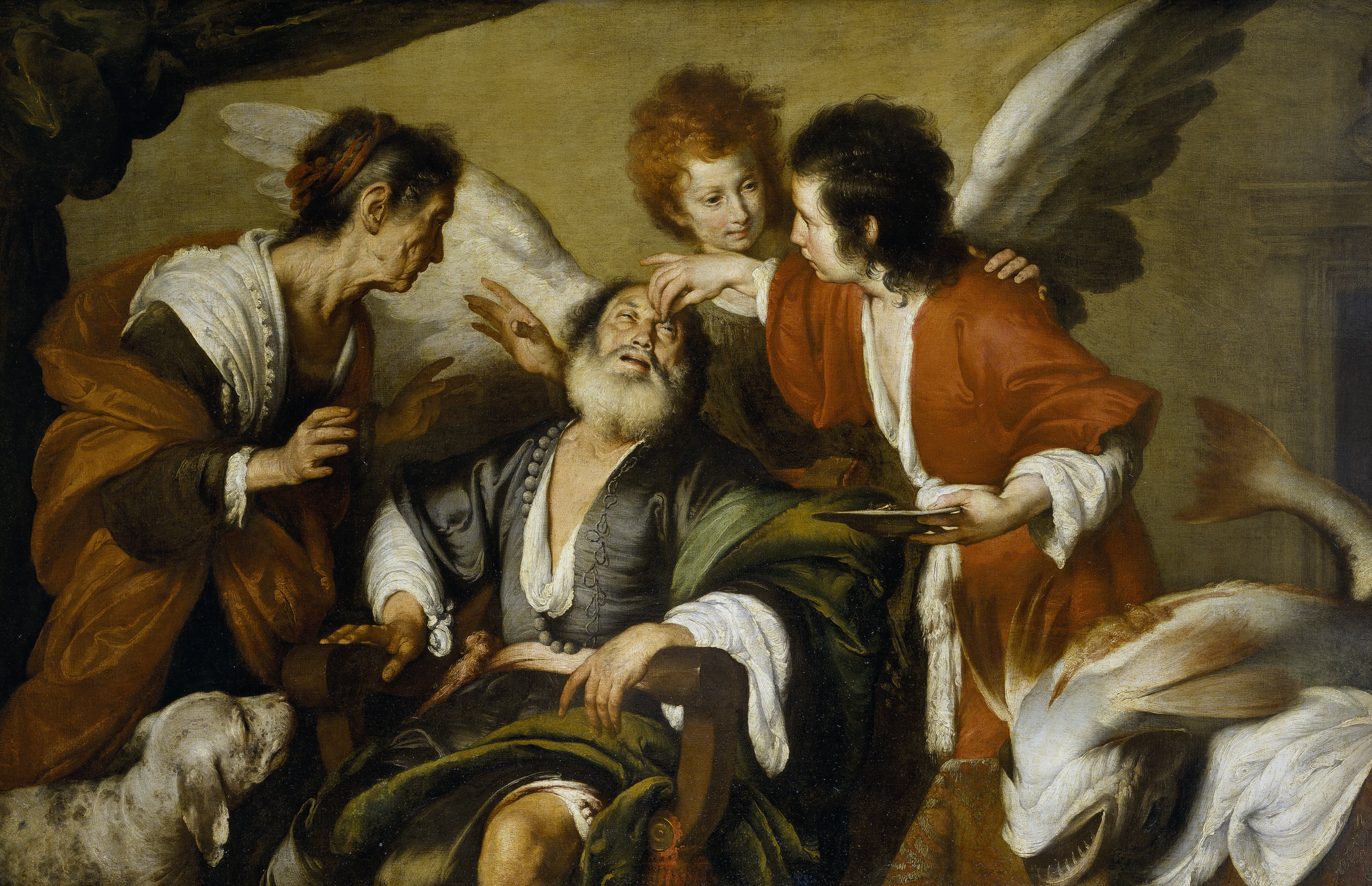
The Healing of Tobit

Strozzi continued to develop his style throughout his career. His art drew its early inspiration from the rich variety of styles flourishing in Genoa around the turn of the 17th century. Starting in a style which borrowed from the artificial elegance of Cambiaso's late Mannerist style he gradually developed toward a greater naturalism.

Strozzi had early on absorbed the Tuscan Mannerist style through his teacher Sorri as well as the style of Milanese Mannerist painting. As a result, the influence of local Mannerism is sometimes difficult to separate from that of Lombard Mannerists. The Mannerism is expressed in the works of this early period in the elongated and curved figures, the tapering fingers, the inclined heads and the abstract patterns of draperies. In the 1620s Strozzi gradually abandoned his early Mannerist style in favor of a more personal style characterized by a new naturalism derived from the work of Caravaggio and his followers. The Caravaggist style of painting had been brought to Genoa both by Domenico Fiasella, after his return from Rome in 1617–18, and by followers of Caravaggio who spent time working in the city, including Orazio Gentileschi, Orazio Borgianni, Angelo Caroselli and Bartolomeo Cavarozzi. Strozzi's Calling of St Matthew (c. 1620, Worcester Art Museum) is particularly close to Caravaggio in style and treatment of this subject, while still retaining certain Mannerist characteristics.

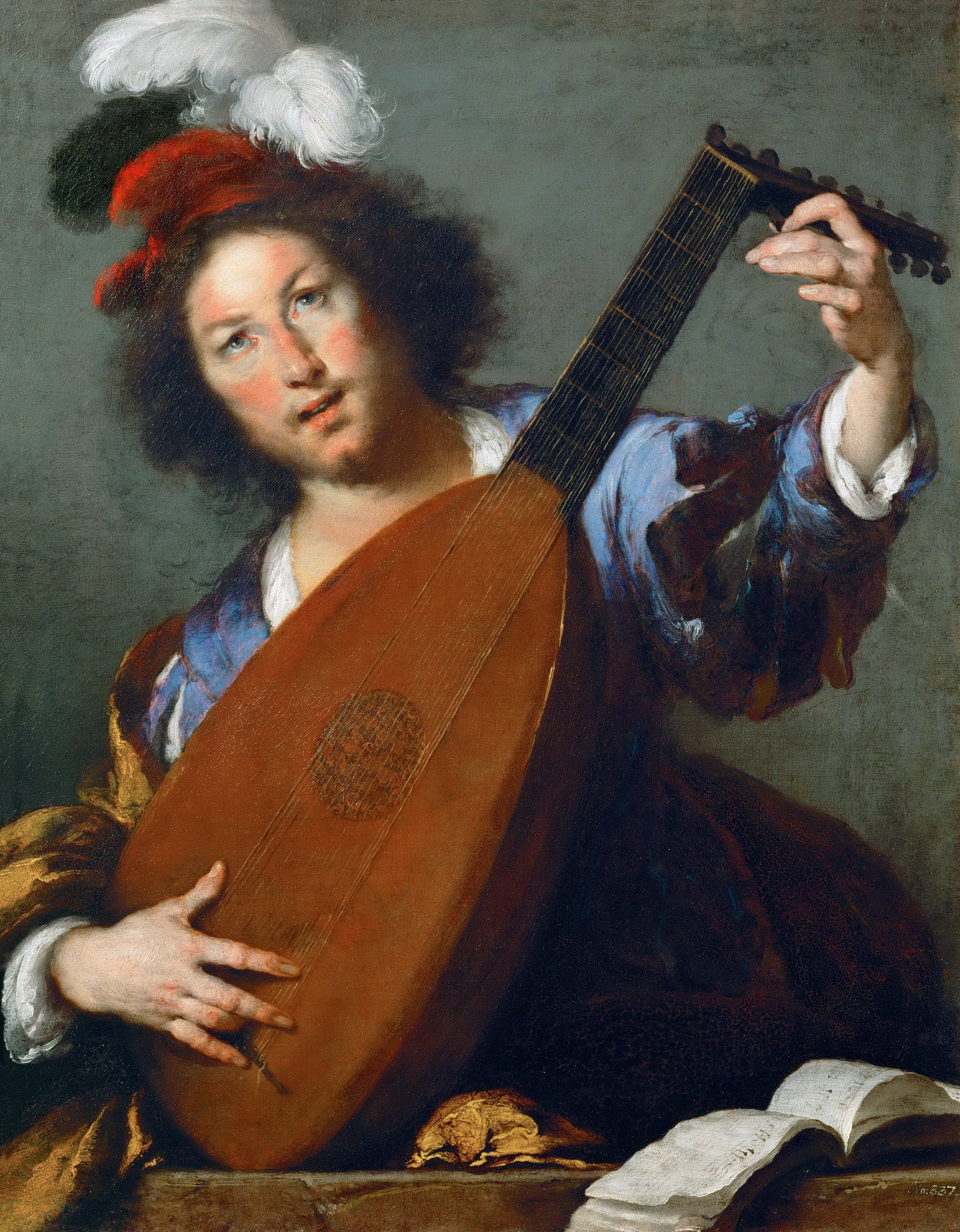
Lute Player

His exposure to the work of Anthony van Dyck, Peter Paul Rubens and other Flemish artists resident or passing through Genoa contributed to a growing naturalism and a definitive rejection of the Mannerist tendencies in his work. Warmer colors started to dominate while he developed a bolder and more painterly technique. In his composition St. Lawrence Distributing the Riches of the Church (c. 1625, Saint Louis Art Museum) the artist achieved a clear and lucid treatment of space and an accurate definition of form by the use of light and shade. The impasto in this work had become even thicker than before.

By the end of the 1620s, Strozzi had started to synthesize a personal style which fused painterly influences of the North (including Rubens and Veronese) with a monumental, realistic starkness. Venice infused his painting with a gentler edge, a style more acceptable to the local patronage, and one derived from his precursors in Venice, Jan Lys and Domenico Fetti, who had also fused the influence of Caravaggio into Venetian art. Veronese's art inspired him to adopt a bolder and more luminous palette. An example of this style can be found in his Parable of the Wedding Guests (1636, Accademia ligustica di belle arti). His style continued at the same time to reveal the strong influence of Rubens as is shown in Allegorical figure (Minerva?) (mid-1630s, Cleveland Museum of Art), which unites the robust forms and brilliant colours of Rubens with the warm atmosphere of Venetian art.

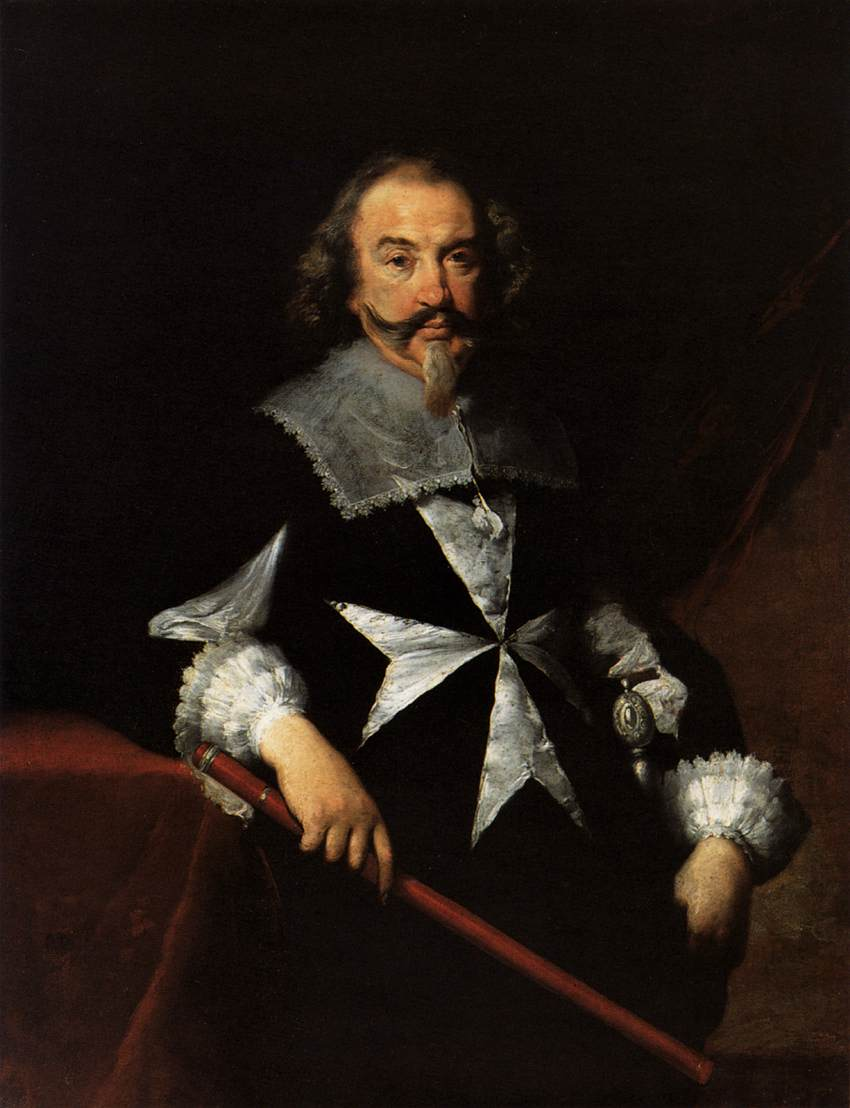
Portrait of a Maltese Knight

His latest works are luminous and sketchy, as can be seen in the David with the Head of Goliath (after 1640, Museum Boijmans Van Beuningen, Rotterdam) and the Rebecca and Eliezer at the Well (after 1630, Gemäldegalerie Alte Meister, Dresden). His Lute Player (after 1640; Kunsthistorisches Museum Vienna) exudes a poetic mood likely derived from his study of the work of Giorgione.

=== Portraits ===
Strozzi was a sought after portrait painter who portrayed the leading aristocratic, clerical and artistic figures of his time. In the late 1630s he was invited to participate in the creation of a series of portraits of distinguished members of the prominent Genoese Raggi family. Other artists invited to participate in this project included Antony van Dyck, Jan Roos, Luciano Borzone and Gioacchino Assereto. About 14 portraits from this series have survived. Although created by different artists, the portraits reveal a certain unity in their arrangements that goes back to van Dyck's models. Strozzi painted more portraits than any other artist participating in the series. This may point to Strozzi's special relationship with the patron.

=== Genre paintings ===
Strozzi was likely inspired by Flemish genre scenes as well as the Caravaggist models to create a group of genre works. Best known of these works is The Cook which exists in many versions (c. 1625, Palazzo Rosso, Genoa, and 1630–40, the Scottish National Gallery). This work goes back to Pieter Aertsen's The Cook (1559; Palazzo Bianco, Genoa) as well as the work of Jan Roos. These works reveal an intention to represent daily life without attaching any meaningful allusions.

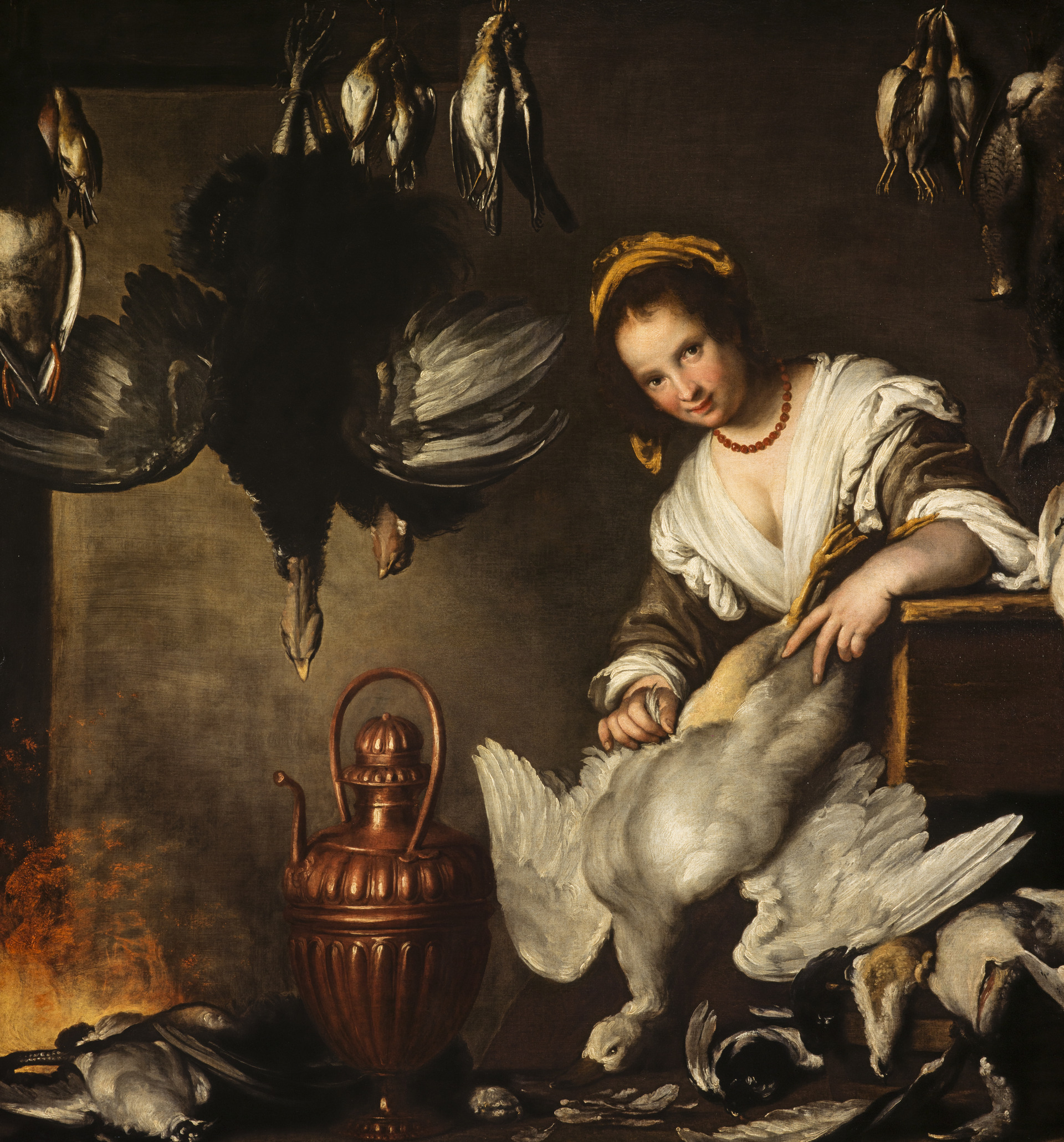
The Cook

His boisterous The flute player (Palazzo Rosso, Genoa), which also exists in several replicas, is another genre painting that shows its indebtedness to Flemish genre art in its subject, palette and painterly technique. Strozzi's use of coloured shadows is indebted to Rubens, but rather than adopting Rubens' practice of allowing a light-coloured ground to occasionally emerge on to the surface, Strozzi worked on a reddish-brown ground with light brushstrokes in paler colours.

=== Still lifes ===
Bernardo Strozzi's career as a still-life painter is still not very well understood and there remains confusion over his artistic development in this genre. His relationship with still-life painters from Lucca such as Simone del Tintore and Pietro Paolini whom he is likely to have met during his supposed trip to Rome in 1625 is not yet fully understood. It is known that he painted still lifes throughout his career and included still life elements in many of his compositions. An example are the still lifes of game in his work The Cook.

Still life with flowers in a glass vase and fruits on a ledge

The Still life with flowers in a glass vase and fruits on a ledge (Collection Bemberg, Toulouse) is one of the few still lifes by Strozzi that is generally accepted as fully autograph. The design is simple as most objects are placed on a similar pictorial plane. The composition invokes Caravaggio's Still life of fruits and flowers in a basket (Pinacoteca Ambrosiana, Milan) in the gentle light entering the scene from the left and the cream background. As was his custom, Strozzi applied the paint thickly throughout the design.

=== Influence ===
Bernardo Strozzi's work exercised considerable influence on artistic developments in both Genoa and Venice. He is considered a principal founder of the Venetian Baroque style. Painters in Genoa strongly influenced by Strozzi included Giovanni Andrea de Ferrari, Giovanni Bernardo Carbone, Valerio Castello, Giovanni Benedetto Castiglione and Gioacchino Assereto. In Venice, Ermanno Stroiffi, Francesco Maffei, Girolamo Forabosco and certain works by Pietro della Vecchia (also known as Pietro Muttoni) also show the influence of Strozzi. He is further been regarded as a possible influence on the Spanish painter Murillo, who may have known his work such as the Veronica (1620–1625, Museo del Prado, Madrid).
