= Carbone =

Carbone is an Italian surname meaning coal in Italian. Notable people with the surname include:

== People ==
- Alejandra Carbone (born 1975) Argentine foil fencer
- Angelo Carbone (born 1968), Italian footballer
- Benito Carbone (born 1971), Italian retired football player and manager
- Fábio Carbone (born 1980), Brazilian race car driver
- Francesca Carbone (born 1968), Italian former sprinter
- Francesco Carbone (born 1980), Italian footballer
- Giovanni Bernardo Carboni or Carbone (1614–1683), Italian painter
- José Carbone (1930–2014), Argentine footballer
- Juan Quartarone Carbone (1935–2015), Argentine footballer and coach
- Maria Carbone (1908–2002), Italian operatic soprano
- Mariah Carbone, American geophysicist and academic
- Mario Carbone (1924–2025), Italian photographer
- Paolo Carbone (born 1982), Italian footballer
- Paul Carbone (1894–1943), Corsican criminal
- Pietro Carbone (1918–1990), Italian judge
- Rodolfo Carbone (1928–2008), Brazilian footballer
- Victor Carbone (born 1992), Brazilian race car driver

== Fictional characters ==
- Dannii Carbone, a character on the soap opera Hollyoaks
- Thorn (Marvel Comics), real name Salvatore "Sal" Carbone

== See also ==
- Carboni, a surname
