= Carbone (disambiguation) =

Carbone is a surname.

Carbone may also refer to:

- Carbone, Basilicata, a commune in Italy
- Carbone (restaurant), an Italian restaurant in New York City
- Carbones, a class of molecules
- Mount Carbone, Marie Byrd Land, Antarctica
- UW Carbone Cancer Center, Madison, Wisconsin, part of the University of Wisconsin
