= Giovanni Andrea de Ferrari =

Italian painter (1598–1669)

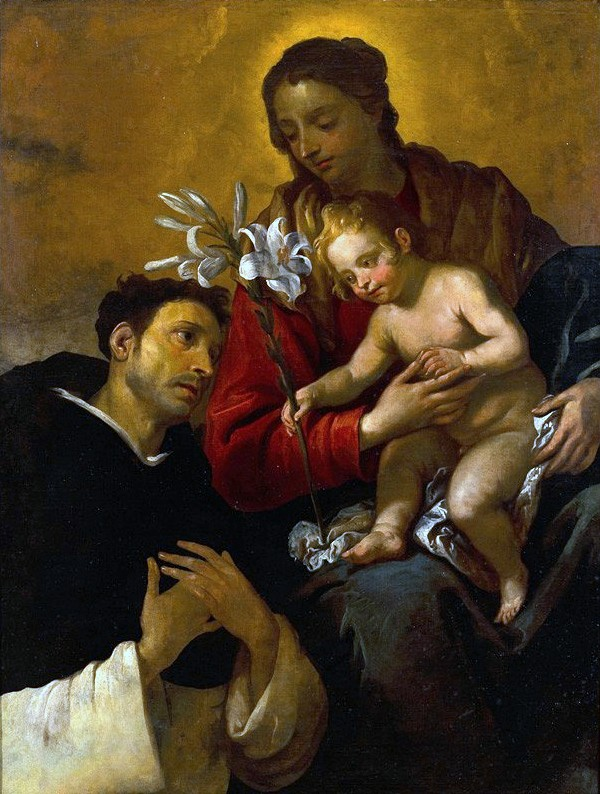
Madonna and Child with St. Dominic

Giovanni Andrea de Ferrari (1598–1669) was an Italian painter of the Baroque period, active mainly in Genoa. A prolific easel painter who created many altarpieces, he was, together with Gioacchino Assereto and Orazio de Ferrari, one of the chief influences on the later development of the Baroque in Genoa.

== Life ==
He was a member of a prominent Genoese family. His father was Battista de Ferrari. After first dedicating himself to the study of literature he later decided to study art. He was first a pupil of Bernardo Castello and later of Bernardo Strozzi. He also studies the works of Anthony van Dyck who had been a resident in Genoa before.

== Work ==
Giovanni Andrea de Ferrari's subject matter was almost exclusively religious. He was such a close follower of the style of his master Strozzi that some of his pictures have been confused with those of his master. His style distinguishes itself, however, from his master's style through his thinner application of paint and his penchant for expressive van Dyckian heads, tapered hands and tightly rolled drapery sleeves. His paintings also reveal an interest in still-life painting and objects of everyday life, which are expressed with a great spontaneity.

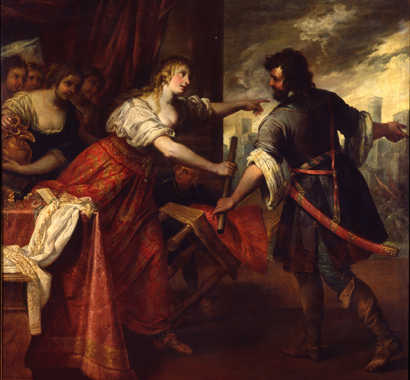
Semiramis Receiving Word of the Revolt of Babylon

He collaborated on some projects with Giovanni Andrea Ansaldo. Among his pupils were Giovanni Bernardo Carbone, Sebastiano Cervetto, Giovanni Andrea Podestà, Valerio Castello, Giovanni Battista Merano, Giovanni Battista Croce and possibly Giovanni Benedetto Castiglione.
