= Appointment Trader =

American reservations trading company

- Company type: Private
- Industry: Reservation Exchange
- Founded: 2021; 5 years ago
- Founder: Jonas Frey
- Headquarters: Las Vegas, Nevada, United States
- Area served: Worldwide
- Key people: Jonas Frey (founder)
- Services: Online marketplace for buying and selling reservations
- Website: appointmenttrader.com

Appointment Trader is an American company that enables individuals to exchange reservations for restaurants, hotels, bars, and some government agencies through an online marketplace. The company was founded by Jonas Frey in 2021. The company runs a platform that allows individuals to buy and sell existing appointments and reservations.

== Overview ==
Appointment Trader was established in 2021 by Jonas Frey, a computer scientist originally from Germany who later moved to Miami, Florida. Frey conceived the idea for Appointment Trader out of personal frustration when attempting to secure an appointment at a high-demand motor-vehicle registration government facility in Nevada. Initially, the website primarily served as a platform for swapping and selling appointments at the Department of Motor Vehicles in Las Vegas during the height of the pandemic. Subsequently, Appointment Trader expanded its scope to encompass reservations for a broader range of establishments, including restaurants, hotels, bars, clubs, and theme parks.

Appointment Trader facilitated the exchange of approximately $1.2 million in reservations between 2021 and 2022. Its website discloses the 12-month trailing volume. As of April 2023, the value of reservations exchanged on the platform in 12 months had increased to $2.4 million.

== Business model ==
Appointment Trader operates on a business model that caters to clients who are willing to pay for reservations that are typically difficult to obtain but would normally be available for free.

The platform, available on both its website and app, incorporates an algorithm developed by Jonas Frey. This algorithm leverages cellphone data sourced from vendors to evaluate the popularity of specific reservations on any given time of day and assigns an initial bid value for users of the platform.

Appointment Trader facilitates reservations across various establishments, including Bern's Steak House, Carbone, Polo Bar, Rao's, Don Angie in New York, Delilah in Las Vegas, and Pebble Bar, Bad Roman, and Sexy Fish in Miami, but they also do concerts, hotels, bars, and many more.

The service operates worldwide, with a significant portion of its user traffic originating from New York City.

== Controversies ==
Some individuals have raised concerns regarding the resemblance of Appointment Trader's business strategy to scalping, an activity prohibited by laws in many states. However, legal experts have pointed out that these laws primarily pertain to tickets within the sports and entertainment industries.

Certain users have expressed dissatisfaction with the lack of responsive customer service on the platform. Jonas Frey has acknowledged this issue and expressed plans to integrate additional features to enhance customer support and response rates.

In October 2022, Bern's Steak House publicly announced that their reservation software provider, OpenTable, was actively investigating the Appointment Trader website, as the resale of reservations is prohibited according to their policies. Appointment Trader does not use OpenTable or any similar system for the sale of reservations.
