= Giovanni Andrea Podestà =

Italian painter (1608–1673)

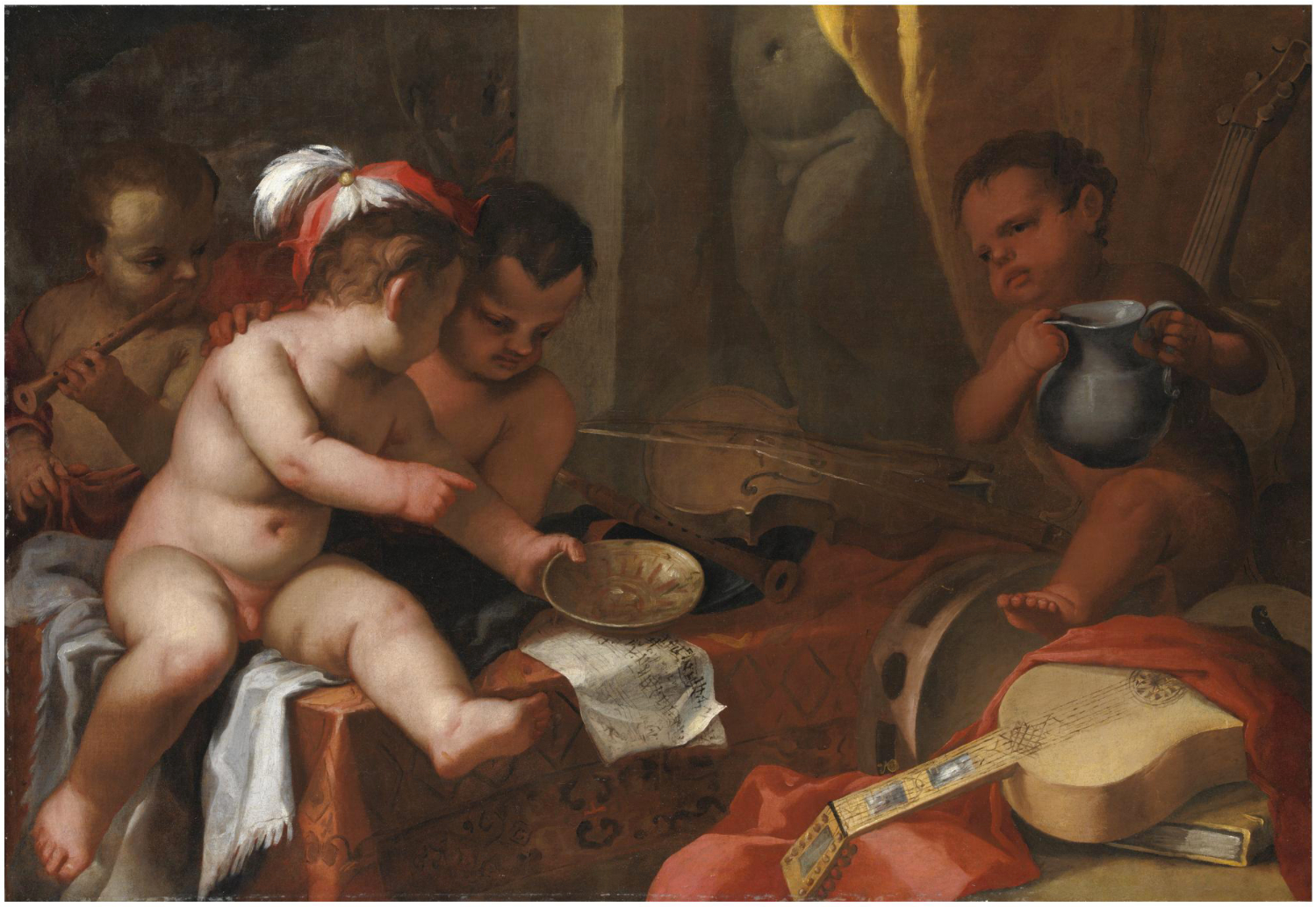
Putti as Allegory of Music

Giovanni Andrea Podestà or Giovanni Andrea Podesta (1608 – c. 1674) was an Italian painter and engraver who was active primarily in Rome. His principal subject matter is children playing in landscapes with classical objects. His works show the influence of Poussin's Arcadian landscapes and bacchanals, which were ultimately derived from Titian's bacchanals.

== Life ==
Giovanni Andrea Podestà was born in Genoa. He was formed in Genoa with Giovanni Andrea de Ferrari and Domenico Fiasella according to the information provided by the contemporary Genoese biographer Raffaele Soprani. He is also recorded as an apprentice of Giovanni Battista Paggi in 1627.

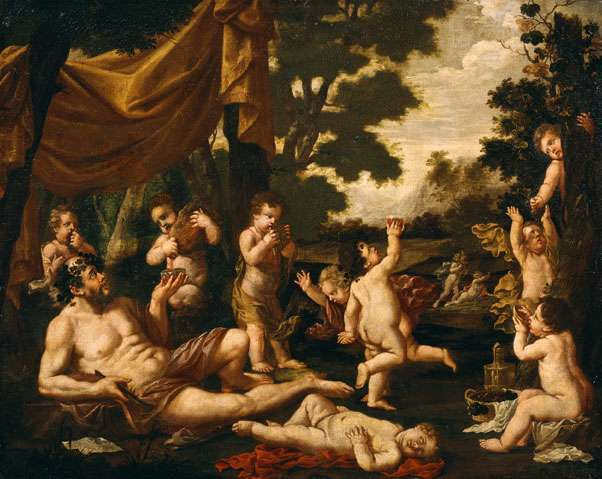
Drunken Silenus

His presence is documented from in 1634 in Rome where he made drawings after the statues and ancient reliefs at the famous Giustiniani collection. These were subsequently engraved for publication in the 'Galleria Giustiniani'. The artist's career ran a course similar to that of the young Domenico Fiasella. In Rome his art evolved in contact with the works of Poussin, Andrea di Leone, Pietro Testa and the Flemish artists François Duquesnoy and Karel Philips Spierincks.

In 1650 Podesta became a member of the Accademia di San Luca in Rome. He died in Genoa.

== Work ==
A majority of Podestà's paintings depict children playing amid classical objects in landscapes. Few of his paintings have survived and his work is now mainly known from the etchings he made himself after his compositions. In particular a series of prints published in Rome which date from 1636 to 1661 form an important source of information on his work.

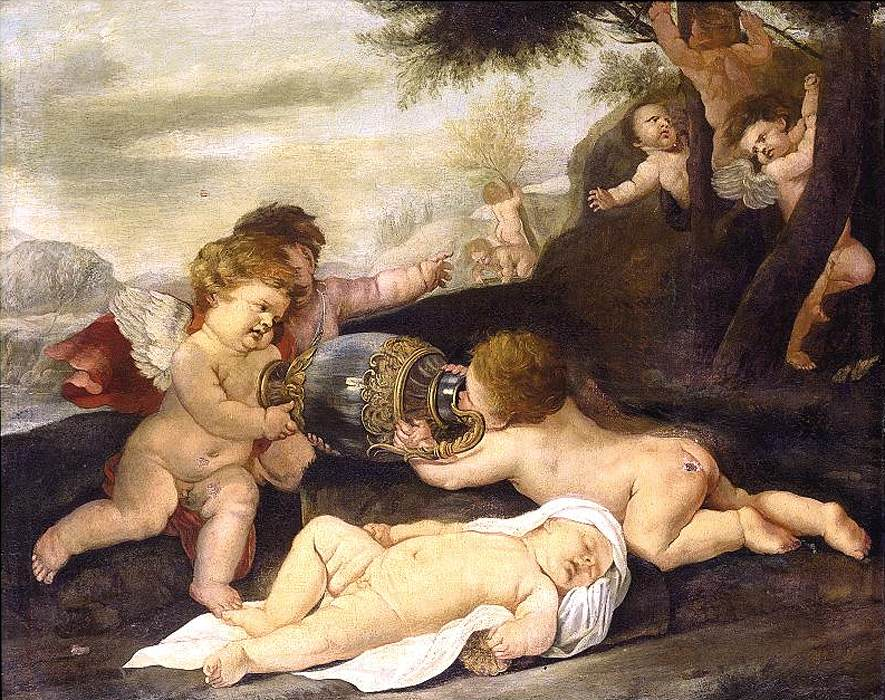
Putti in a Landscape

Podestà made prints after the bacchanals of Titian, which he dedicated to powerful patrons. He dedicated a series of prints to the pleasures of wine to Paolo Giordano Orsini II, Prince of Bracciano. Orsini also owned multiple paintings by Podestà, including two landscapes and seven small paintings of seafood. A Worship of Venus etched after Titian was dedicated to Cassiano dal Pozzo and other prints of bacchanals to Fabio della Cornia. The artist clearly tried tocurry favour with the Barberini family through these dedications. Cassiano dal Pozzo was known for his archaeological interests. Podestà's acquaintance with Cassiano dal Pozzo may have played a role in Podestà’s artistic development and may have put him in the circle of Poussin. This circle included Flemish artists such as the sculptor François Duquesnoy and the painter Karel Philips Spierincks who at one time or the other shared a home in Rome and also had common artistic interests. In this circle there was an interest in Classicism as well as a growing interest and admiration for the bacchanals of Titian. This found expression in copies and reproductions after Titian as well as new compositions inspired by the theme of the bacchanals. The mutual influence of the artists in this circle is clear from the fact that Podestà's Bacchus and Ariadne (At Arte Antico) cites in the putto who scares another putto with a mask similar figures in a Drunken Silenus of the Flemish painter Karel Philips Spierincks.

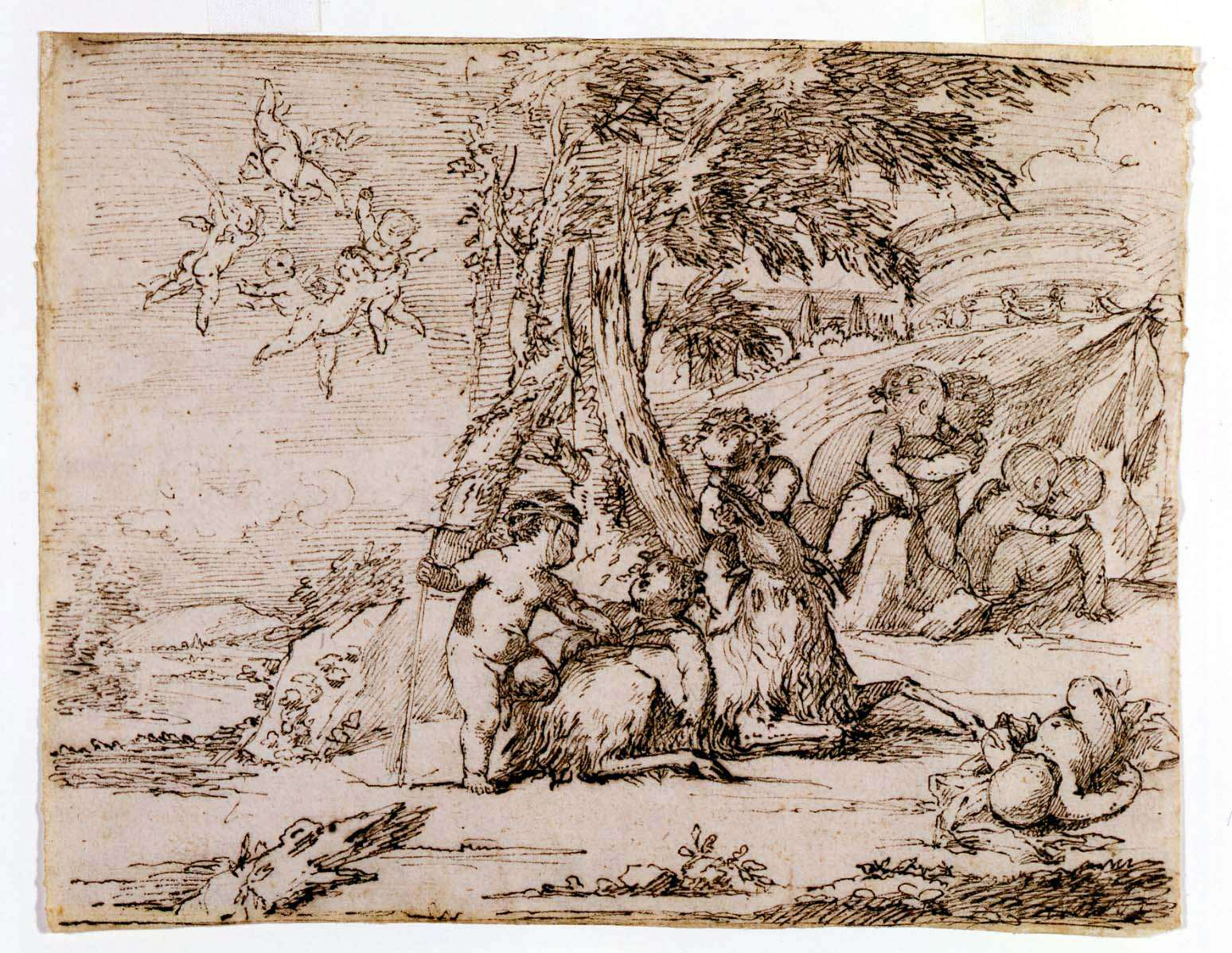
Landscape with a Bacchanal of Putti and a Goat

The quality of his work and its closeness to the Poussin circle was such that it is often difficult to distinguish his work from compositions by Poussin and Spierincks. His work has considerable charm, a feature sometimes lacking in the work of his more illustrious contemporaries. One scholar noted that "Although Podestà was neither a great designer nor a great draughtsman, his amusing conceits display the lighter side of the often sober classical devotees in Rome in the 1630s and 1640s." Although a rather marginal artist, his works depicting putti at play definitely had an influence on late Genoese Baroque painting, such as on the decorative artists of the Casa Piola.

The few drawings by Podesta that have been preserved show features familiar from his etchings: contorted facial expressions, small twisting figures, patches of dark cross-hatching and an interest in still-life. In their precision they are similar to and possibly derived from Sinibaldo Scorza, whose prints may have been an inspiration for Podestà's own etchings.
