= Giovanni Battista Paggi =

Italian painter (1554–1627)

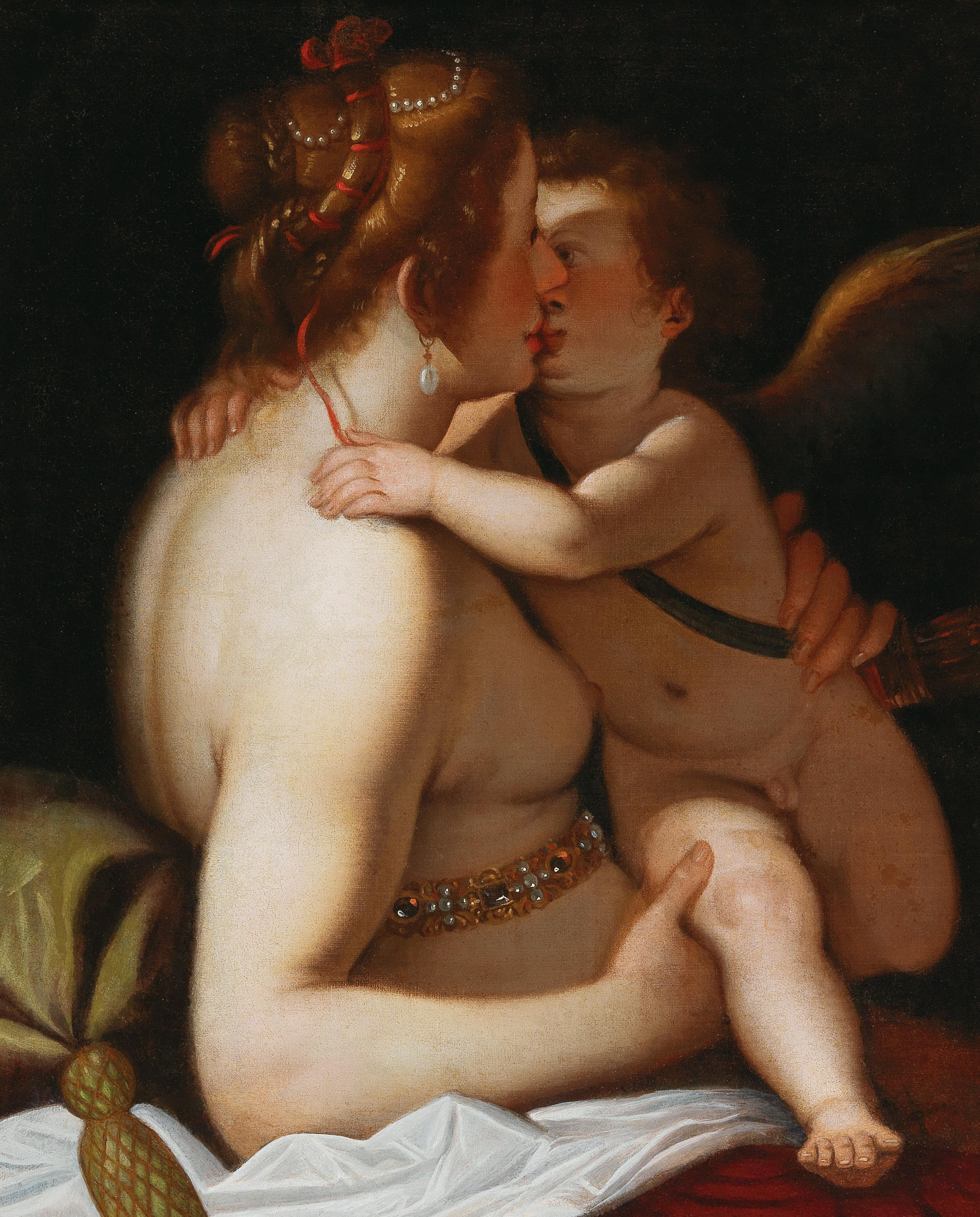
Venus and Cupid

Giovanni Battista Paggi (25 or 27 February 1554 – 12 March 1627) was an Italian painter, sculptor, and writer. His style spans the Late-Renaissance and early-Baroque.

== Life ==
He was born in Genoa into the well-to-do family of his father Pellegrino. In an apparent dispute over pay, he is said to have mortally wounded a patron, and was forced to flee Genoa in 1579, and take refuge in Tuscany, in the towns of Aulla sul Magra, then Pisa, and finally to Florence.

He joined the Accademia e Compagnia delle Arti del Disegno in 1568. He shared a studio in Florence with Federico Zuccari. He maintained contact with his native town and returned to Genoa briefly in 1590 as a guest of the Doria family. Giovanni Battista Paggi became renowned among fellow artists throughout Europe when in 1590 he won his case against the Genoese Painters' guild and was allowed to practice his art without having to become a member of the Guild. The government of Genoa decided the case in his favour on grounds of public as it wished to encourage persons of noble birth such as Paggi to become artists to add to the glory of the city.

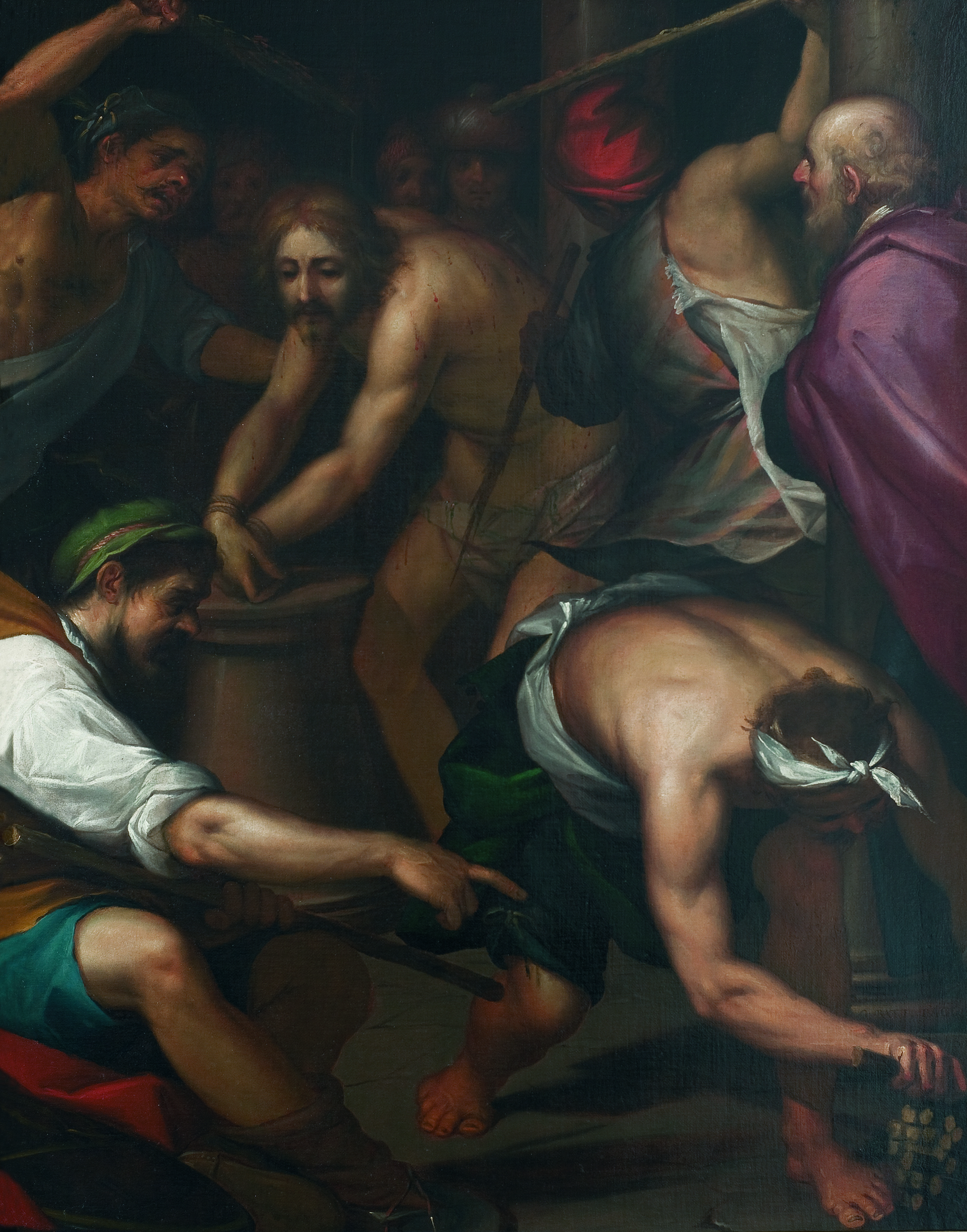
The flagellation of Christ

He settled back in Genoa in 1599.

He was the teacher of Giulio Benso, Giovanni Benedetto Castiglione, Sinibaldo Scorza, Domenico Fiasella, and Giovanni Andrea Podestà. Other sources cite Scorza, Luciano Borzone, Giulio Benso Bernardo Castello, Giovanni Domenico Cappellino, and Agostino & Giovanni Battista Montanari as his pupils.

== Work ==
Giovanni Battista Paggi is known as a follower of the style of Luca Cambiasi.

== Works ==
- Miracle of Saint Catherine (converting two criminals) – Great Cloister of Santa Maria Novella, Florence
- Transit of Saint Clare – Basilica della Santissima Annunziata del Vastato, Genoa
- Martyrdom of Saint Ursula and the virgins -Duomo, Savona
- Venus with two cupids sharpening arrows -Genoa
- Madonna of the Rosary – Accademia Ligustica di Belle Arti di Genova, Genoa
- Birth of the Virgin -Lucca Cathedral
- Martyrdom of Sant'Andrea (1590) – Sant'Agostino, Loano
- Annunciation -San Lorenzo, Genoa
- Venus and Cupid -Dulwich Picture Gallery, London.
- Crucifixion with Saints (1610)- Duomo of Pisa

== Sources ==
- Farquhar, Maria (1855). Ralph Nicholson Wornum (ed.). Biographical catalogue of the principal Italian painters. London: Woodfall & Kinder. p. 116.
- Soprani, Raffaello (1769). Carlo Giuseppe Ratti (ed.). Delle vite de' pittori, scultori, ed architetti genovesi; Tomo primo scritto da Carlo Giuseppe Ratti. Genoa: Stamperia Casamara. pp. 112–138. "Genovesi Raffaello Soprani."
