= Ermanno Stroiffi =

Italian painter

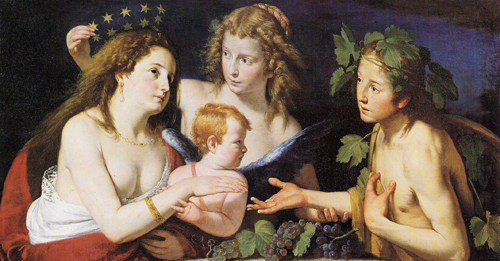
Bacchus and Ariadne

Ermanno Stroiffi (20 October 1616 in Padua – 4 July 1693 in Venice) was an Italian Baroque painter and priest. A pupil of Venetian painter Bernardo Strozzi, he created altarpieces, portraits and genre scenes. Stroiffi became a priest in 1647, and in that role he helped introduce the Oratory of Saint Philip Neri in Padua and Venice.

== Life ==
Stroiffi was born on 20 October 1616 in Padua, the son of the Flemish painter Giovanni (Jan or Johan, his original Flemish first and family name are not known) who was then working in Padua. His father died before 1644 as is demonstrated by Ermanno's signature on the will of Bernardo Strozzi in that year. His mother Laura died on 12 September 1652.

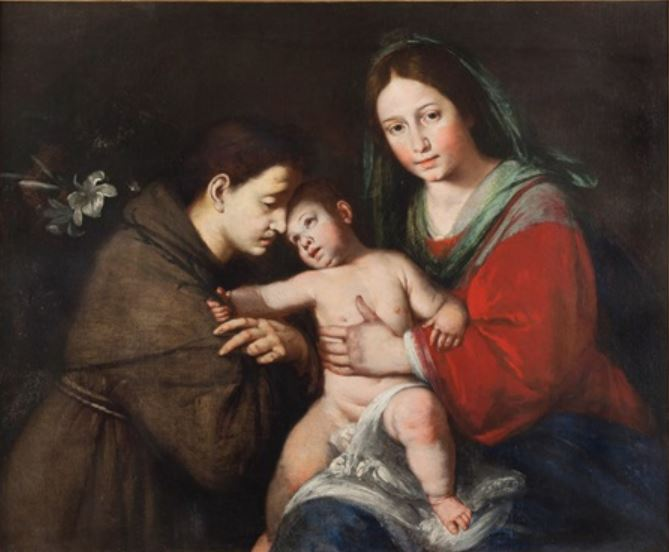
Madonna and Child with Saint Anthony

He became an assistant in the workshop of Bernardo Strozzi. Strozzi was the leading painter in Venice in the first half of the 17th century and also a Capuchin friar. Stroiffi was Strozzi's favorite assistant and worked on many of the large commissions which Strozzi received. Stroiffi was also a beneficiary of Strozzi's will.

Between 1645 and 1654 when he was still at the start of his career, Stroiffi travelled to various cities in central northern Italy. One of the cities was Mantua, the historic power base of the Gonzaga family, which was an important patron of the arts. He received commissions from the Ducal court. Other painters active at the court in Mantua at that time included Daniel van den Dyck, a Flemish artist who had moved to Mantua around 1657 and had become the court painter. In the 1650s Stroiffi participated in the cycle of the oratory of San Filippo Neri at the hospital of San Lazzaro dei Mendicanti in Venice.

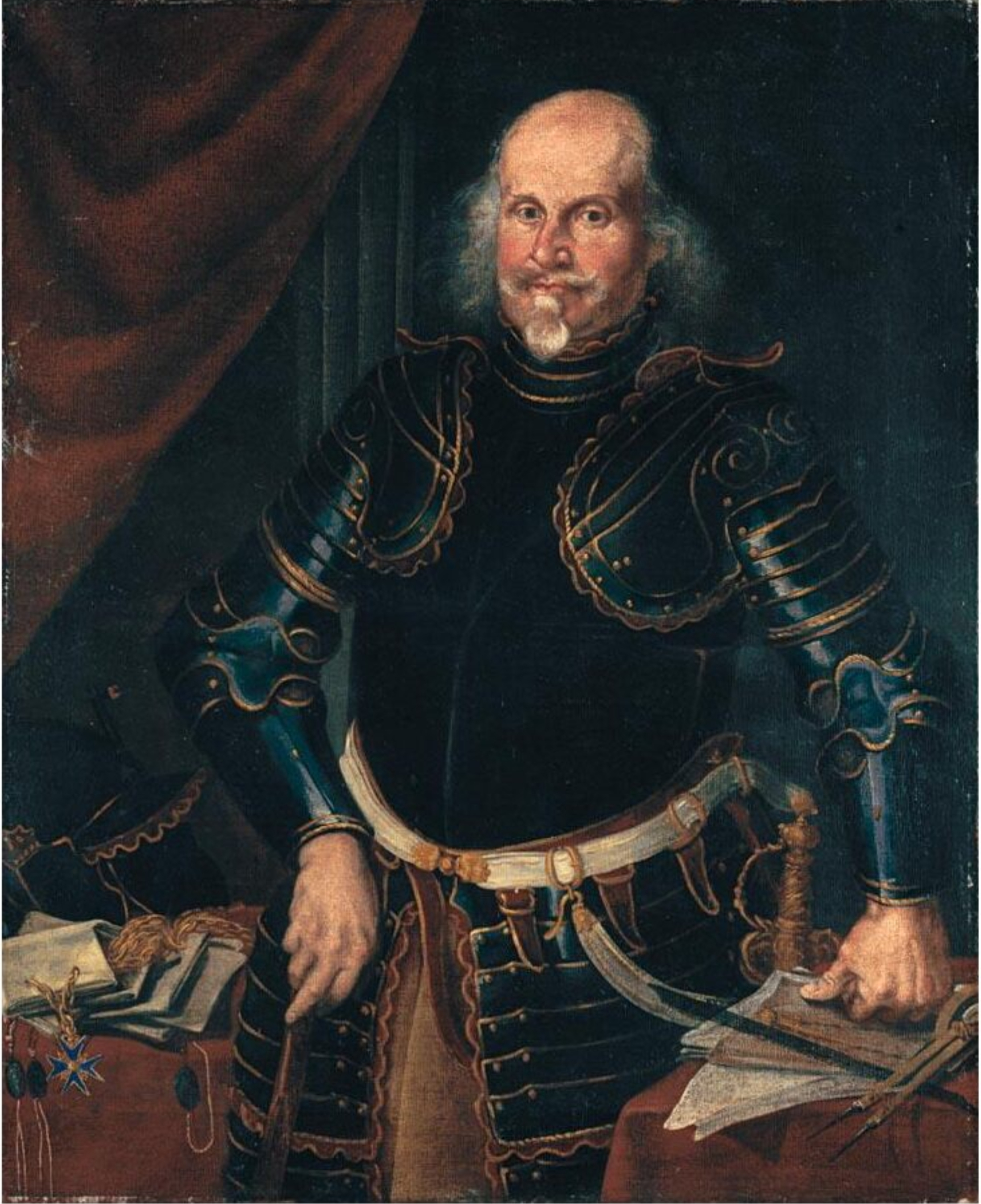
Portrait of a condottiero

Stroiffi became a priest in 1647. He played an important role in the establishment of the Congregation of the Oratory in Padua and Venice.

== Work ==
Ermanno Stroiffi was a versatile and prolific artist who worked on canvas and as a fresco artist. He treated a wide range of subject matter including religious, mythological and allegorical themes as well as genre scenes and portraits. Some of his compositions include still life elements. Religious compositions make up the majority of his works. The number of works attributed to the artist is limited as a good part of his production is still submerged in the countless paintings attributed to Strozzi and his workshop.

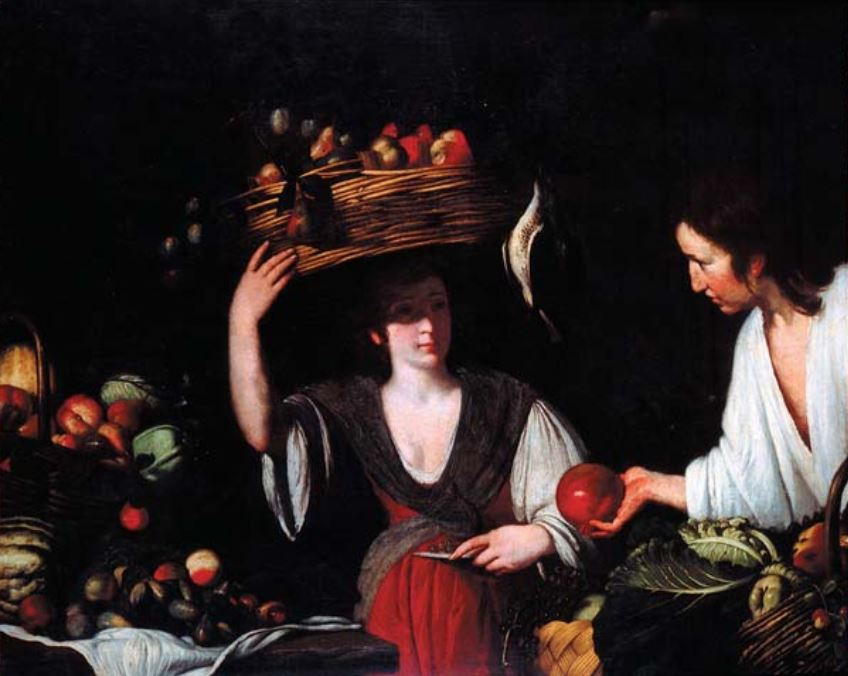
Fruit vendor

His style was close to that of his master Strozzi. He gradually developed away from Strozzi's example and created powerful compositions through the use of shade.

The relationship between the works of Stroiffi and Strozzi can be illustrated through the early work Fruit vendor (Ducal palace, Mantua). The work was only recently attributed to Stroiffi after having been attributed to a painter in the circle of Strozzi. The work was created in Mantua during the years of Stroiffi's apprenticeship. The painting is derived from Strozzi's original (Stanley Moss collection, Riverdale on Hudson, N.Y.). Stroiffi has reworked his master's model in line with his personal artistic preferences. The veil of the fruit vendor appears softened and the male profile reflects a model by Stroiffi, which reappears in a series of works recently attributed to the artist. Another difference between Stroiffi's and Strozzi's versions is that the fabrics in Strozzi's original are swollen and crispy while they are drooping and flat in Stroiffi's work. Stroiffi has also added more fruit and vegetables, showing his interest in the still life genre.
