= Giovanni Battista Carboni =

Italian painter (1725–1790)

Giovanni Battista Carboni (29 March 1725 in Brescia – 29 December 1790 in Brescia) was an Italian sculptor, painter, and writer of Le Pitture e Sculture di Brescia. He was active during the Baroque period, mainly in Brescia.

== Biography ==
His father, Rizzardo, was a stucco and wood carver. His brother Domenico, also engaged in this type of decoration, as well as architecture, died at age 41 in 1768. The third brother, Bernardino Carboni, died in 1779, was a decorator and wood sculptor.

Giambattista studied humanities under Rambaldini, but was then recalled by his father to help in the stucco decoration business, working in 1746 in the decorations inside the church of Carità in Brescia. Around 1760, he executed the sculptural decoration of the altar of the Santi Martiri Protectore in the parish church of Coccaglio. He also worked with B. Manenti in 1754 on the altar of the Santissimo Rosario of the church of San Clemente. In 1759, he published a guide of anatomy for painters with the print of G. B. Bossini. In about 1762, he sculpted busts of bishops, then cast in silver by G. Filiberti, for the church of San Lorenzo. In 1766, he completed statues for the altars of the church of Santi Cosma e Damiano.

He carved two wooden statues of Saints Catherine of Siena and Dominic for the parish church (altar of the Rosary) of Corticelle, the choirs of San Faustino and the new Cathedral dall'Oretti, the cherubs for the church of Santa Maria del Patrocinio in Brescia. He also designed two paintings for the latter church. In 1774-75, he completed the statues of the evangelists Matthew and Mark for the Duomo Nuovo of Brescia.

By 1775–1776, he had completed the polychrome wooden statue of St Francis Xavier for the church of San Rocco in Bergamo. Between 1766 and 1788, he carved the statues of Virtue and of angels, which decorate the ciborium of the altar of the chapel of the Holy Sacrament (completed by his brother Bernardino in the abbey church of Montichiari). In 1790, he created a model of the statue of the Virgin of the Assumption, later completed by Possenti for the Duomo Nuovo. Giambattista's portrait by Santo Cattaneo is kept at the University of Brescia.

== Bibliography ==
- Boselli, Camillo (1976). "CARBONI, Giovanni Battista". Dizionario Biografico degli Italiani (in Italian). Vol. 19: Cappi–Cardona. Rome: Institute of the Italian Encyclopaedia. ISBN 978-88-12-00032-6.
