= Karel Philips Spierincks =

Painter

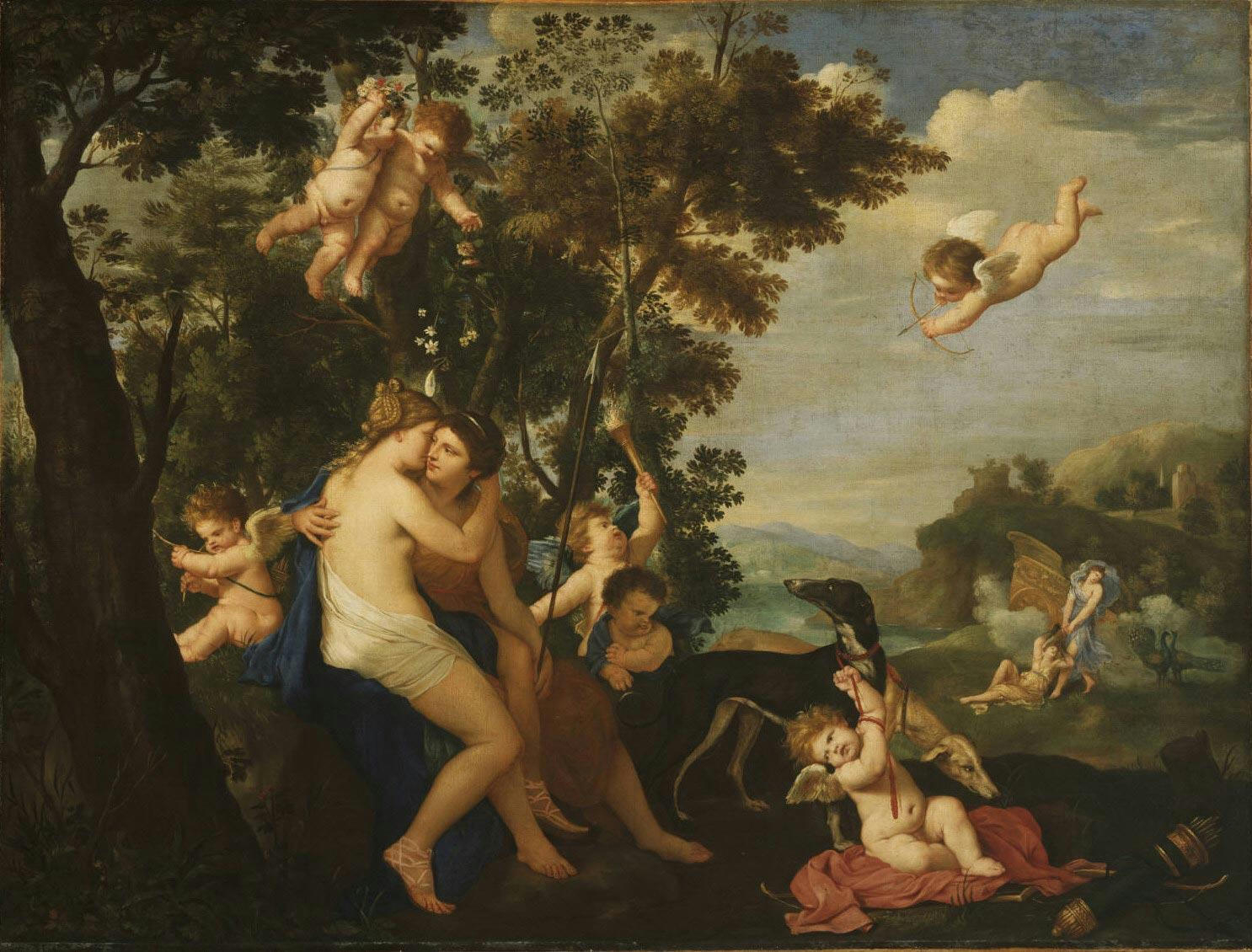
Jupiter and Callisto

Karel Philips Spierincks (many name variations: Spierinckx, Spierinck, Spieringh, Spiringh, Spirinck, Spirinx, Spirin, Carlo Filippo Fiammingo) (9 March 1598, in Brussels – 22 May 1639, in Rome) was a Flemish painter who spent his active career in Italy. He painted mainly landscapes with putti or mythological scenes in a classicizing style which show the influence of François Duquesnoy and Nicolas Poussin as well as religious paintings.

== Life ==
He is mentioned as a pupil of Michel de Boerdous in Brussels in 1612 and as a master in the Brussels Guild of Saint Luke in 1622. He was in Rome by 1622 and it is believed that he may briefly have been a pupil there of his Flemish compatriot, the landscape painter Paul Bril.

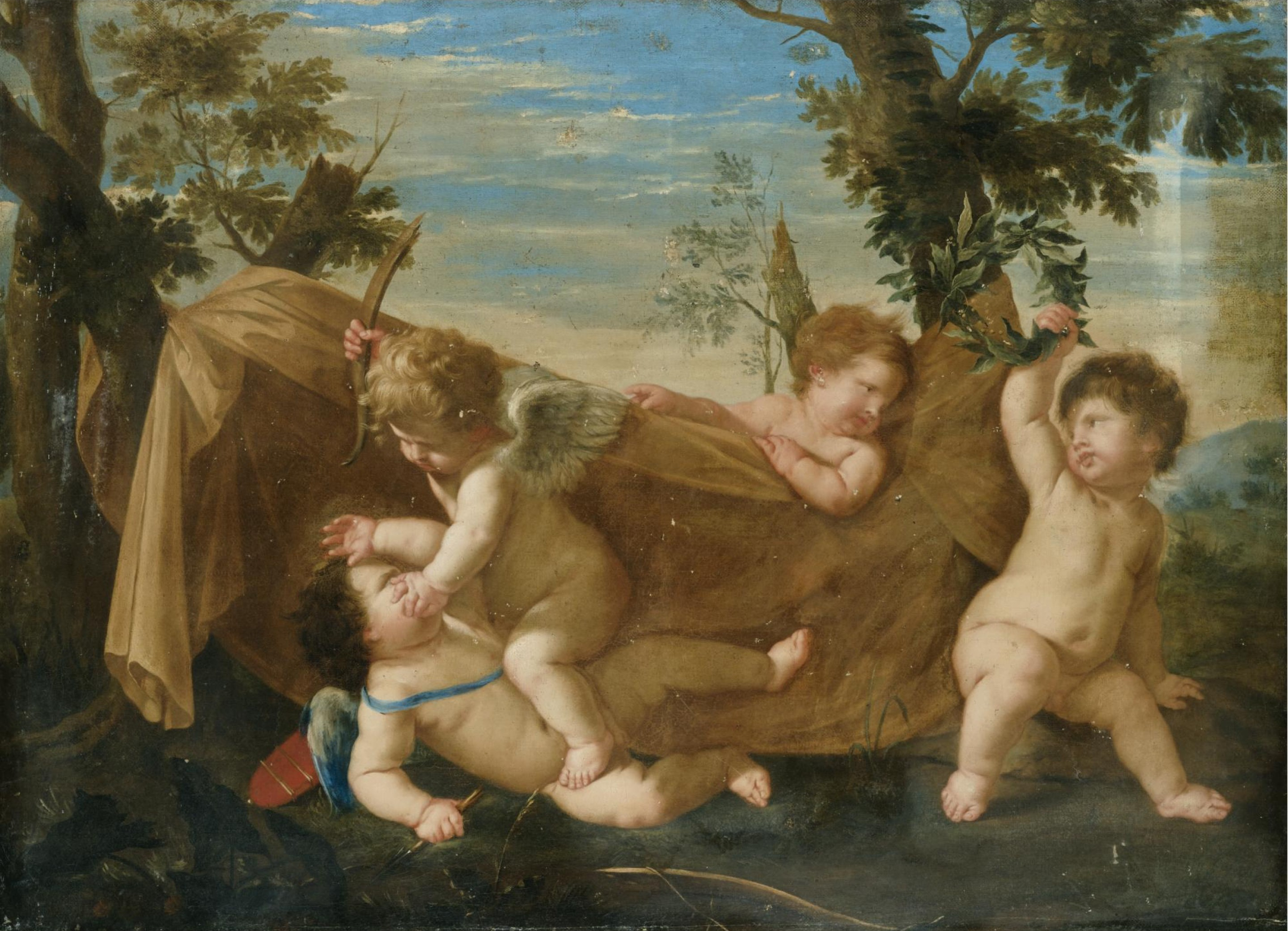
An allegorical scene with putti fighting

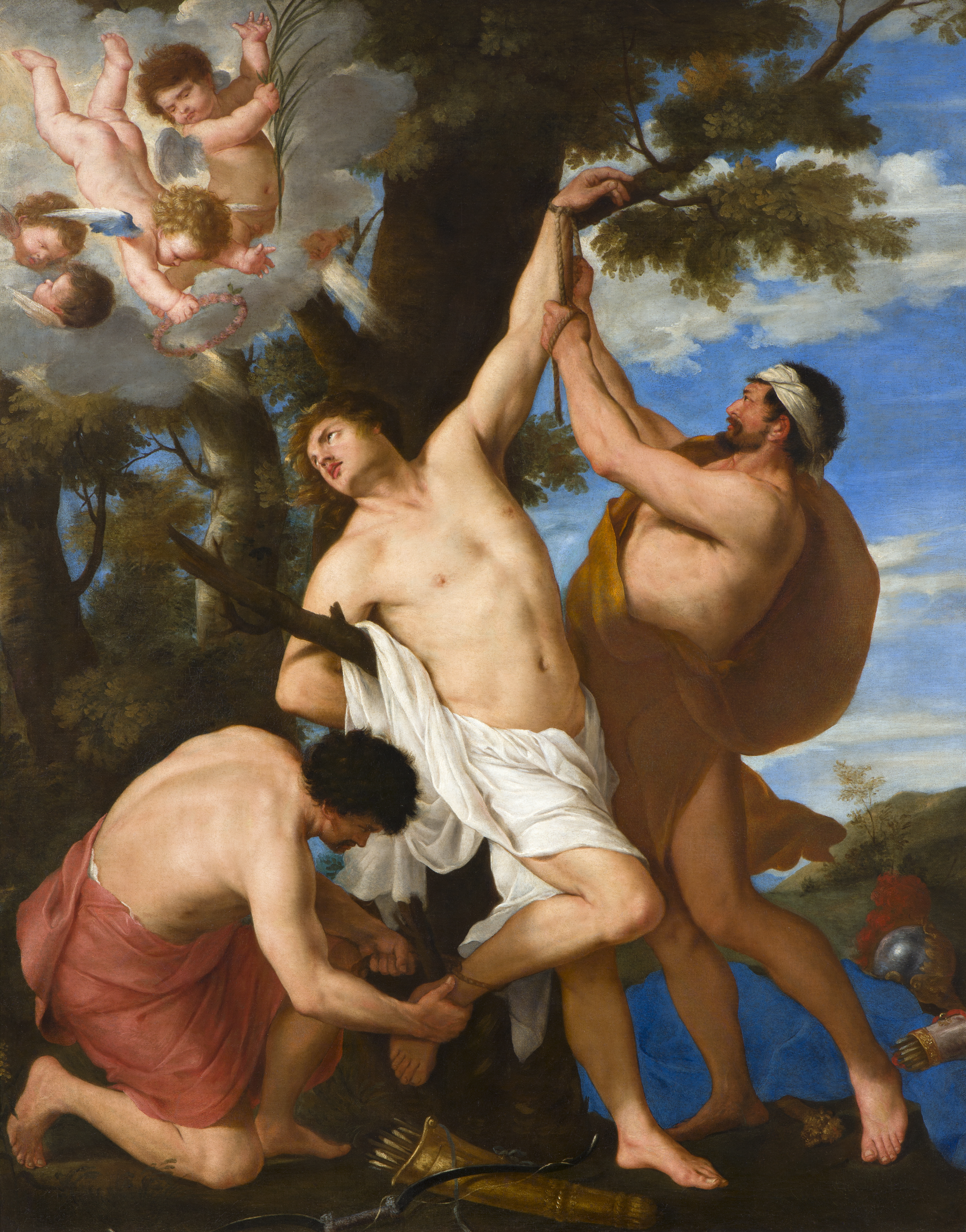
Martyrdom of Saint Sebastian

By 1625 Spierincks is documented as sharing a house with the Flemish sculptor François Duquesnoy (1597–1643). The two artists lived together in via della Vittoria near Piazza di Spagna from 1630 until Spierincks’ death in 1639. François Duquesnoy had previously shared lodgings with Nicolas Poussin.

In the period 1634–35 Spierincks was paying dues to the Accademia di San Luca in Rome, though not as a member. He died on 22 May 1639 and was buried near the high altar of Santa Maria della Pietà in Camposanto dei Teutonici, a Roman Catholic church in Vatican City.

== Work ==
The work of Spierincks can be divided by subject matter into mythological and religious paintings. The two major influences on his style were Poussin and François Duquesnoy. The influence of Duquesnoy can be seen in his Classicist tendencies and the theme of the putti.

Poussin had during his first decade in Rome (1624–34) created a series of mythological landscapes inspired by Titian’s series on the theme of the Bacchanales (one now in the National Gallery, London, and two in the Prado, Madrid) and on the pastoral love poetry of classical antiquity such as the Eclogues of Virgil. These Poussins are playful and erotic celebrations of the idyllic life of Arcadia but also have a serious undertone. Spierincks was inspired by Poussin's paintings to produce a series of mythological paintings often depicting putti in a bucolic setting. His work is sometimes confused with that of another follower of Poussin, the Italian painter Andrea de Leone.

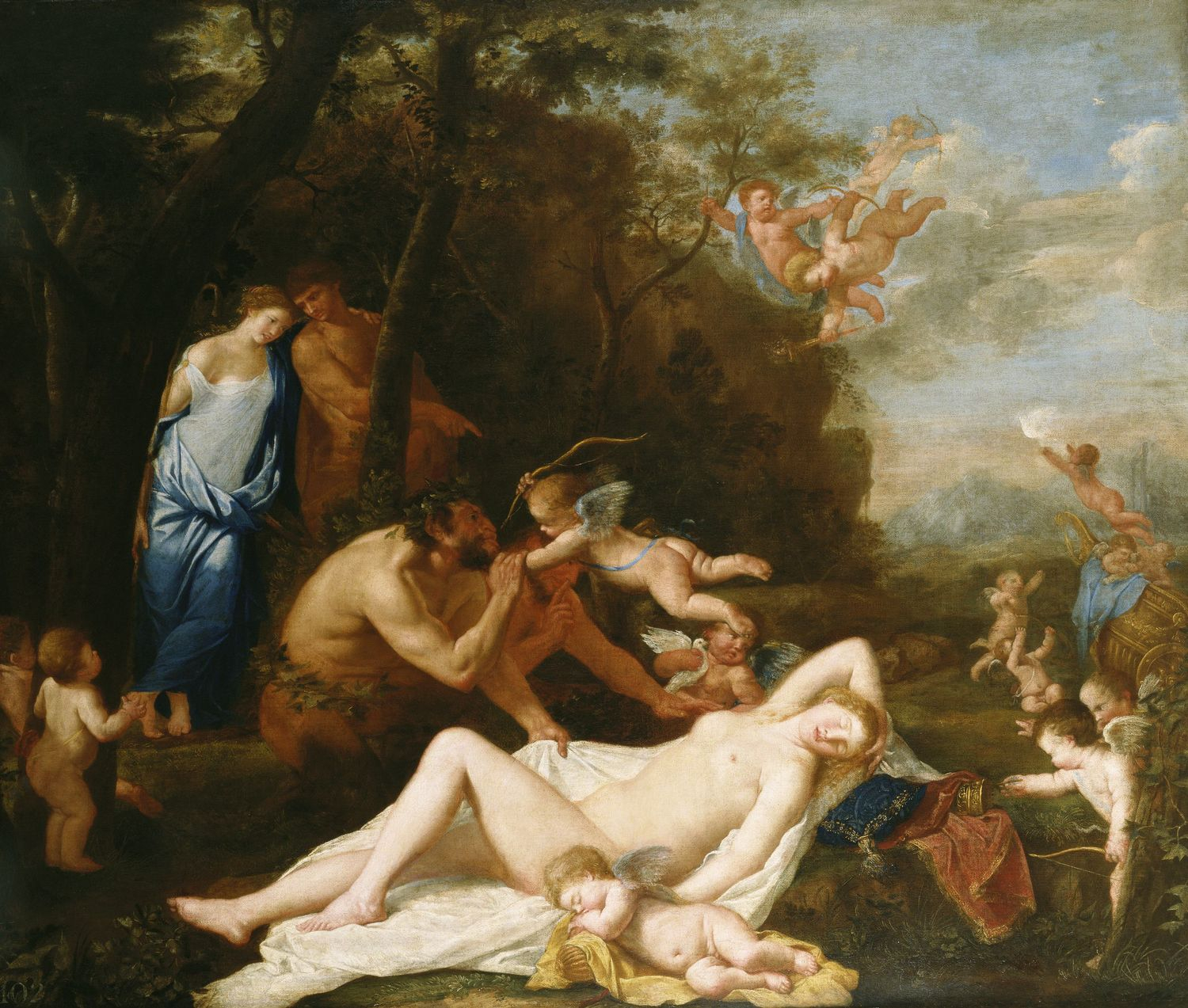
Venus Sleeping, with Satyrs and Cupids

Spierincks left incomplete paintings for the sacristy of Santa Maria dell'Anima which he had already started. These paintings have not survived although one of them, a Saint Norbert, was recorded on 2 March 1643 in the house of 'Petrus Piscator' i.e. Peter Visscher (or Pieter de Vischere), an Italian banker and patron of Flemish origin.

== Literature ==
- Stefan Albl, 'Poussins Freunde: Pietro Testa und Karel Philips Spierincks', Die neue Ausgabe der Frühneuzeit-Info, 6 November 2013, p. 29–42
- A.F. Blunt, 'Poussin Studies X: Karel Philips Spierincks, the First Imitator of Poussin's Bacchanals', The Burlington Magazine 102 (1960), p. 308–311
- D. Bodart, Les peintres des Pays-Bas méridionaux et de la principauté de Liège à Rome au XVIIeme siècle, Brussel-Rome 1970, dl. 1, p. 137–140
- S. Danesi Squarzina, 'Il Silebo ebbro di Spierinck. Dai baccanali alla storia sacra', in: Roma luce ed ombra. Due dipinti tra terzo quarto decennio del seicento (Galleria Silvano Lodi & Due, TEFAF Maastricht), Milaan 2008, p. 44–95; speciaal p. 87–91: S. Danesi Squarzina & L. Lorizzo, 'Carel Philips Spierinck a Roma. Regesto documentario'
- M. Beccari, 'A 'St Sebastian' by Karel Philips Spierinck', The Burlington Magazine 162 (2020), p. 595–598
