= Bernardino Carboni =

Italian decorator and wood sculptor

Bernardino Carboni (died 1779) was an Italian decorator and wood sculptor of the Baroque period, mainly active in Brescia.

He helped prepare the celebrations for 5 January 1779 to celebrate the accession to a cardinal of Lodovico Calini. His brother Domenico, who also engaged in this type of decoration, as well as architecture, died at age 41 in 1768. The third brother, Giambattista, born 1729, was a sculptor, painter, and writer of Le Pitture e Sculture di Brescia.
