= Mario Carbone =

Italian director and photographer (1924–2025)

Mario Carbone (12 May 1924 – 18 May 2025) was an Italian director, cinematographer and photographer.

== Life and career ==
Mario Carbone was born on 12 May 1924. He began his apprenticeship as a photographer in San Sosti, and later moved to Milan and continued his photography work until 1955, when he relocated to Rome. There, he started his cinematographic career as a director of photography and a filmmaker.

In 1964, he won the Nastro d'Argento (Best Short Film) with Stemmati di Calabria, a documentary on the abandonment of feudal lands by the Calabrian nobility. In 1967, he won the Silver Lion at the Venice Biennale for his work Firenze.

Throughout his long career, he collaborated as a photographer and director of photography with significant figures in Italian literature and cinema, such as Carlo Levi, Mario Soldati, Cesare Zavattini, Cecilia Mangini, Luigi Di Gianni, Giuseppe Ferrara, and Libero Bizzarri.

Carbone died on 18 May 2025, at the age of 101.

== Partial filmography ==
=== Direction ===
- I misteri di Roma (1963)
- Stemmati di Calabria (1963) - short film
- Ti spacco il muso, bimba (1982)

=== Direction of photography ===
- Donne in Carnia, directed by Axel Rupp (1959)
- Gli stregoni, directed by Raffaele Andreassi (1961)
- De Chirico metafisico, directed by Raffaele Andreassi (1962)
- I ragazzi che si amano, directed by Alberto Caldana (1963)
- Italiani come noi, directed by Pasquale Prunas (1963)
- Ecco il finimondo, directed by Paolo Nuzzi (1964)
- L'amore breve, directed by Romano Scavolini (1969)
