= Gioacchino Assereto =

Italian painter

- Born: 1600; Genoa, Republic of Genoa
- Died: 1649 (aged 48–49); Genoa, Republic of Genoa
- Known for: Painting
- Notable work: The Torture of Prometheus; The Lamentation, Death of Cato, Esau sells his birthright, Ecce Homo
- Style: Baroque
- Children: Giuseppe Assereto

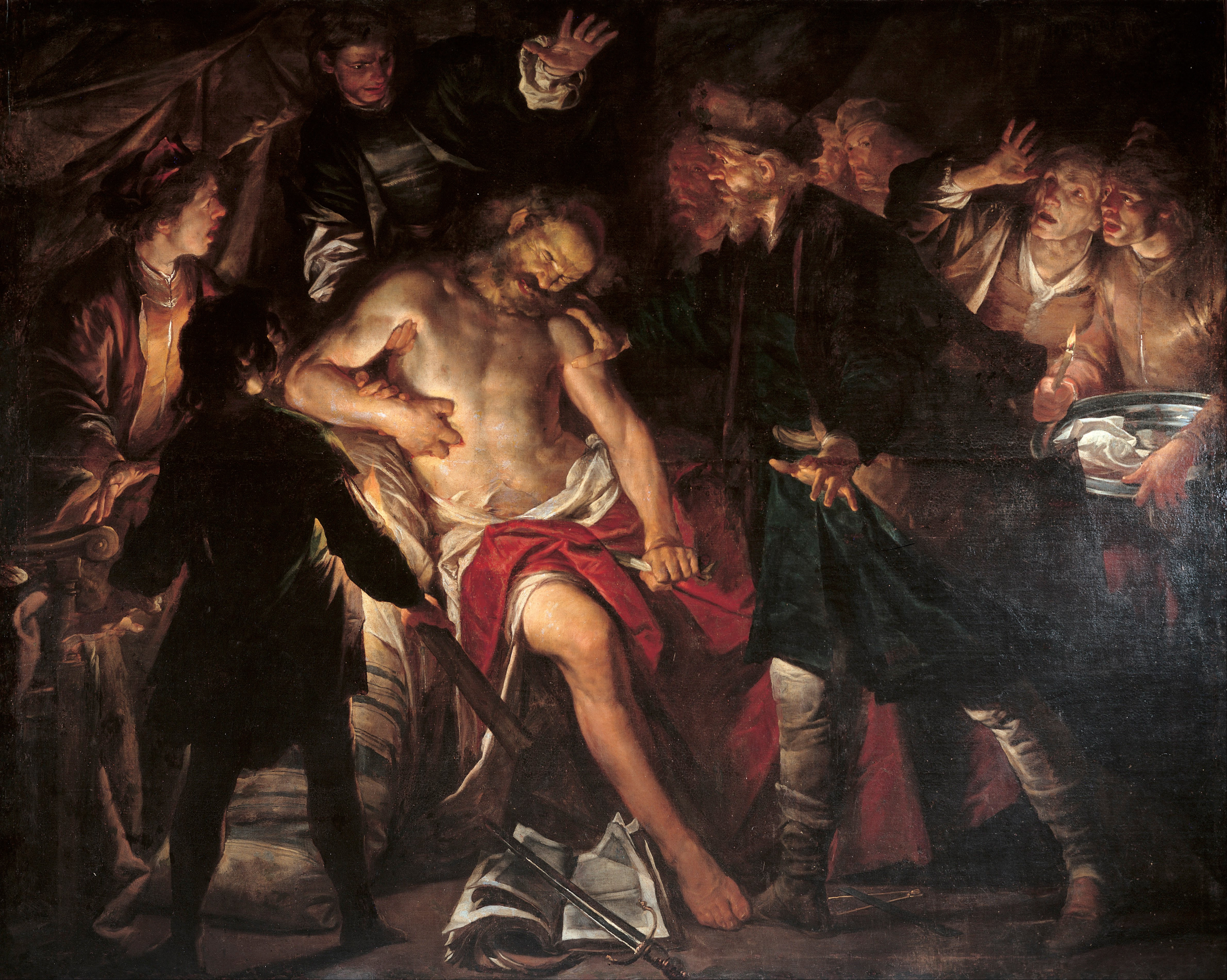
Death of Cato

Gioacchino Assereto (1600 – 28 June 1649) was an Italian painter of the early Baroque period and one of the most prominent history painters active in Genoa in the first half of the 17th century.

== Life ==
He initially apprenticed at age 12 with Luciano Borzone and from circa 1614, in the studio of Giovanni Andrea Ansaldo. He attended the Academy of the Nude (painting from nude models) instituted by Giancarlo Doria.

He was active in Genoa. In 1639, Assereto he travelled to Rome where he visited the studios of various painters. He likely met Genoese artists working in Rome, such as Luca Saltarello, Giovanni Maria Bottalla, Giovanni Benedetto Castiglione and Giovanni Andrea Podestà. His stay in Rome was important as it brought him in contact with the developing realism of the followers of Caravaggio.

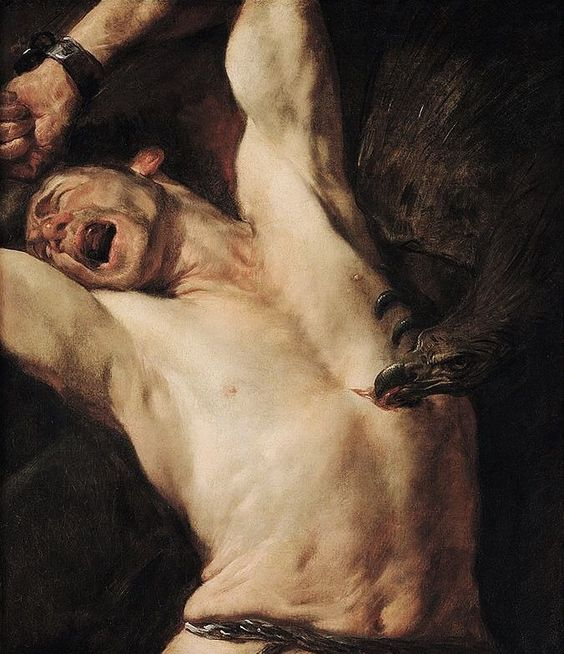
The Torture of Prometheus

In the 1640s, Assereto was active as a fresco painter. The artist was very successful in Genoa and in his later years many copies of his work were produced in his studio, some by his son Giuseppe Assereto. The artist was in his lifetime praised by the contemporary Genoese biographer Raffaele Soprani as incomparable. The vain artist shared this view.

== Work ==
Most of Assereto's works depict religious and history subjects, although he also produced some portraits. Throughout the decade in which he was a student, Assereto produced many works in a Baroque idiom, which were close in style and genre. He incorporated drama and emotion in his paintings with the aid of the chiaroscuro and sfumato techniques. He continued to improve his technique and style during his twenties and thirties. During his visit to Rome in 1639, he discovered a flourishing interest in realism and Caravaggism. His interest in realism and encouraged him to continue with his detailed description of heads and hands. It may also have revealed to him the possibilities of compositions that depend on chiaroscuro rather than on colour.

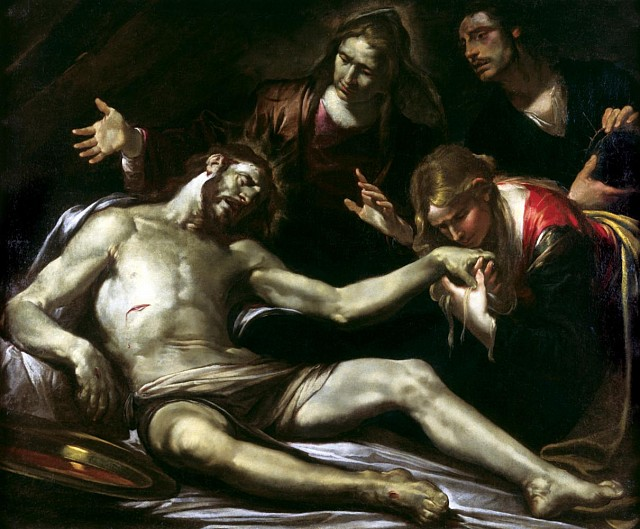
The Lamentation

In 1640, Assereto painted The Lamentation, a powerful picture which uses a black background and intense shadows to give dramatic effect to Christ's dead body that almost seems to shimmer in the darkness. A work also showing this Caravaggist influence is the Death of Cato (Musei di Strada Nuova, Palazzo Bianco, Genoa), in which Assereto moved away from his refined style with vivid colours to a bolder, more powerful style where theatrical effects of flaming torches and candlelight emphasize violent emotions. The work also shows the influence of northern Caravaggesque painters such as Gerrit van Honthorst and Matthias Stom.

In the 1640s, he devoted himself to an in-depth study of the works of Rubens and Anthony van Dyck. As a result, his compositions became more lively and agitated. He also introduced a greater emotional involvement in his works through the use of lights and colours that reveal the knowledge of the Venetian school. His Ecce Homo (1640s), shows in the broad and phlegmatic figure of Christ the influence of the Ecce Homo painted by Anthony van Dyck in Genoa circa 1625.

His late works often depict figures at three-quarter-length and are characterised by a sober realism, a delicate psychological tension between the figures and the grave beauty of the still lifes. These works have been compared to works by Velázquez and Murillo. An example is Esau sells his birthright (c. 1645; Palazzo Bianco, Genoa).

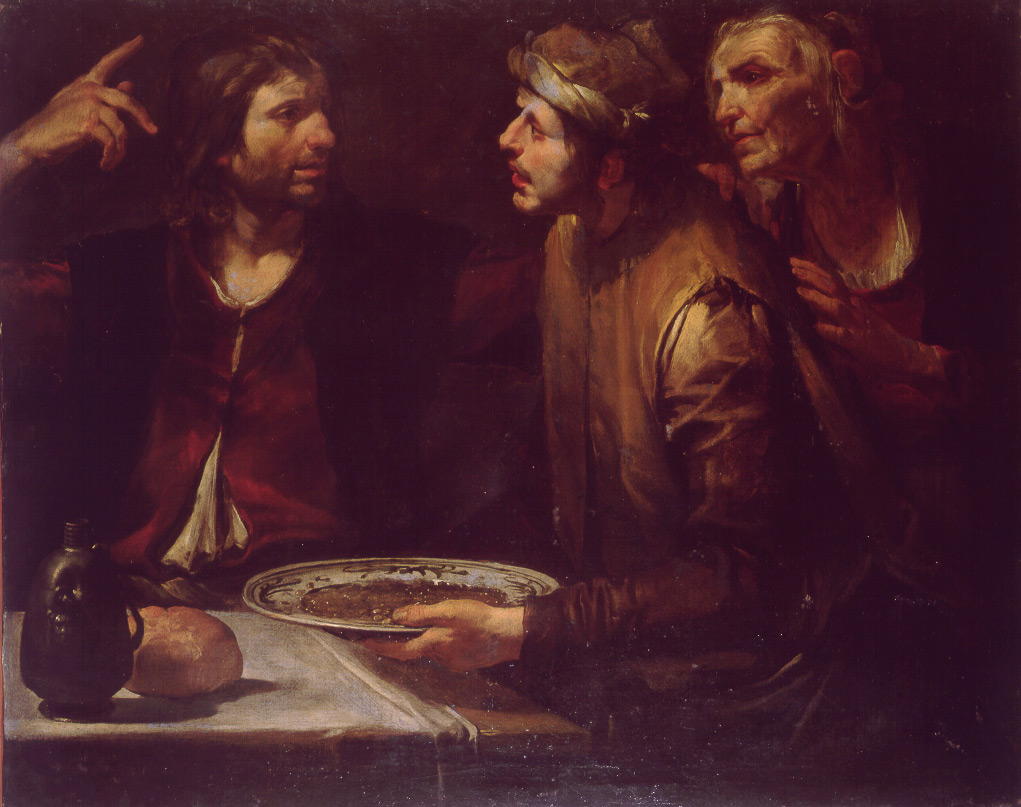
Esau sells his birthright

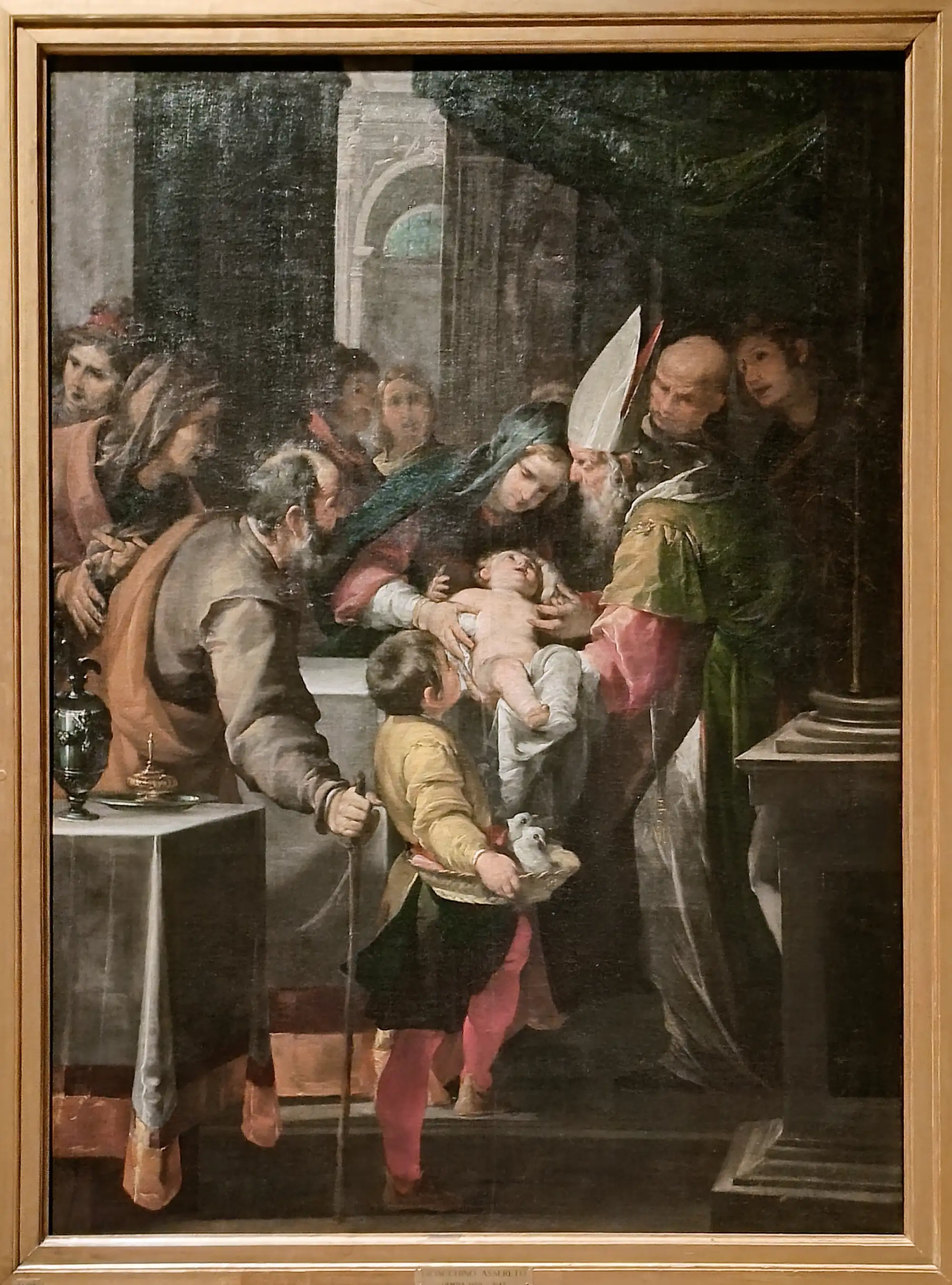
Presentation in the Temple, circa 1630. Pinacoteca di Brera, Milan, Italy.

Gioacchino Assereto was also active as a fresco painter. In the 1640s, he painted frescoes for the Palazzo Granello and commissioned works for the Sant'Agostino church. Only fragments of these frescoes have been preserved.
