= Francesco Carboni =

Italian painter

Francesco Carboni was an Italian painter of the Baroque period. He was a Bolognese. He was the pupil of Alessandro Tiarini. He afterwards was a follower of Guido Reni. He died in 1635. Among his works are noted : a Crucifixion, with St. Theresa and Maggiore, and other Saints for S. Martina in Bologna; an Entombment of Christ for S. Paolo; and for the Servite fathers, a Decollation of St. John the Baptist.
