= Giovanni Bernardo Carbone =

Italian painter (1614–1683)

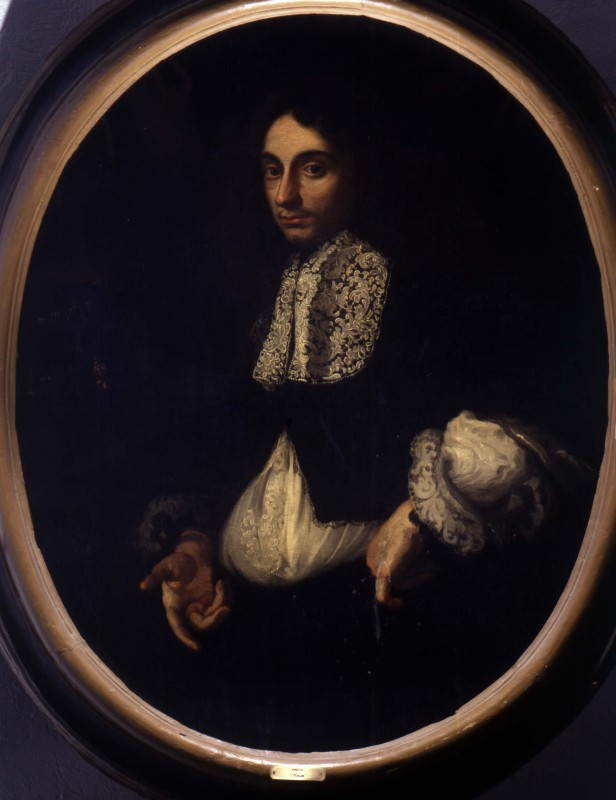
Ritratto di gentiluomo (Fondazione Cariplo)

Giovanni Bernardo Carbone (also Carboni; 12 May 1614 – 11 March 1683) was an Italian painter of the Baroque period.

== Biography ==
He was born in Albaro, near Genoa. He became a pupil of Giovanni Andrea de Ferrari, and he was likely a contemporary in the studio with two other Ferrari pupils: Giovanni Benedetto Castiglione and Giovanni Andrea Podesta. Other influences on his style came from trips to Venice of c. 1643–44 and 1650, his friendships with Valerio Castello and Casone, as well as the contact with his prolific brother and painter, Giovanni Battista Carlone.

He is best known as a portrait painter, usually in full-length or three-quarters view; his portraits are mainly of aristocracy dressed in full regalia or shown amid items of their property in the manner of Anthony van Dyck. He died at Genoa.

== Bibliography ==
- Bryan, Michael (1886). Robert Edmund Graves (ed.). Dictionary of Painters and Engravers, Biographical and Critical. Vol. I: A-K. London: George Bell and Sons. p. 231.
- Portrait of aristocrat, L'Archimede Gallery of Art, Rome
- Madonna con il Bambino dormiente Museo Palazzo Rosso, Genoa
- Artnet biography from Grove Encyclopedia of Art
- Domenico Sedini, Giovanni Bernardo Carbone, online catalogue Artgate by Fondazione Cariplo, 2010, CC BY-SA.

== Other projects ==
Media related to Giovanni Bernardo Carbone at Wikimedia Commons
