= Bombing of Genoa in World War II =

WWII bombardment against Italian industrial city Genoa

Bombing of Genoa
- Part of the Second World War
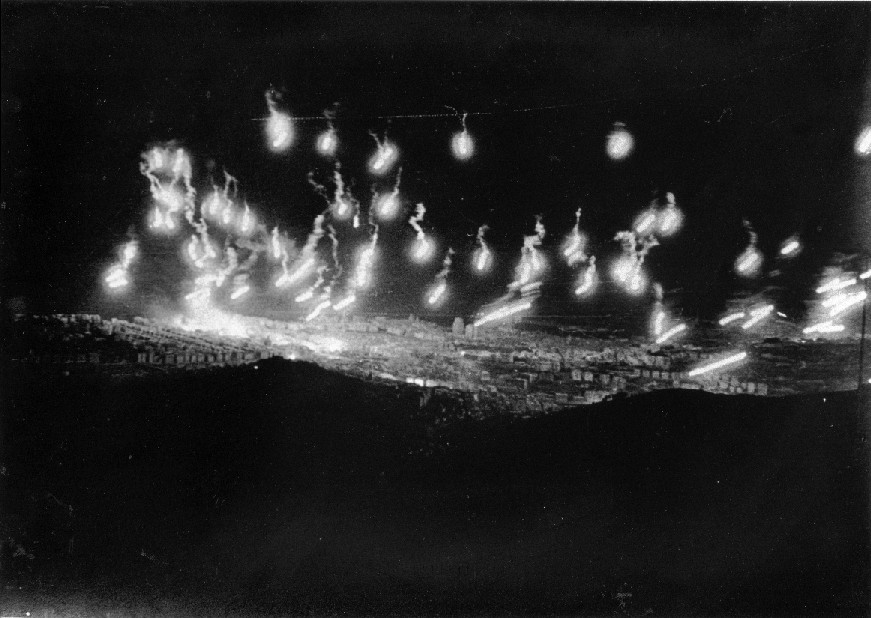
- Genoa lighted by flares dropped by RAF aircraft during a raid in late 1942
Date	June 1940 – April 1945
Location	Genoa, Italy

Belligerents
United Kingdom; United States	Italy; Italian Social Republic; Germany

Owing to the importance of its port (the largest and busiest port in Italy) and industries (such as the Ansaldo shipyard and Piaggio), the Italian port city of Genoa, the regional capital and largest city of Liguria, was heavily bombarded by both Allied air and naval forces during Second World War, suffering heavy damage.

== Naval bombardments ==
=== 14 June 1940 ===
On 14 June 1940, four days after Italy's entry into the war, the French heavy cruisers Dupleix and Colbert with destroyers Albatros and Vautour sortied from Toulon and shelled Genoa's industrial zone, between Sestri Ponente and Arenzano (at the same time, another French naval formation attacked the industrial plants of Savona and Vado Ligure). Italian coastal batteries returned fire and seriously damaged Albatros, while the only reaction from the Regia Marina, owing to the paucity of naval forces available in the area (all the Italian battlefleet was in Taranto at the time), was limited to a daring but ineffectual counter-attack by the torpedo boat Calatafimi. The French naval bombardment, however, did not cause much damage or casualties; three civilians were killed and twelve were wounded. All damage was repaired within ten days.

=== 9 February 1941 ===
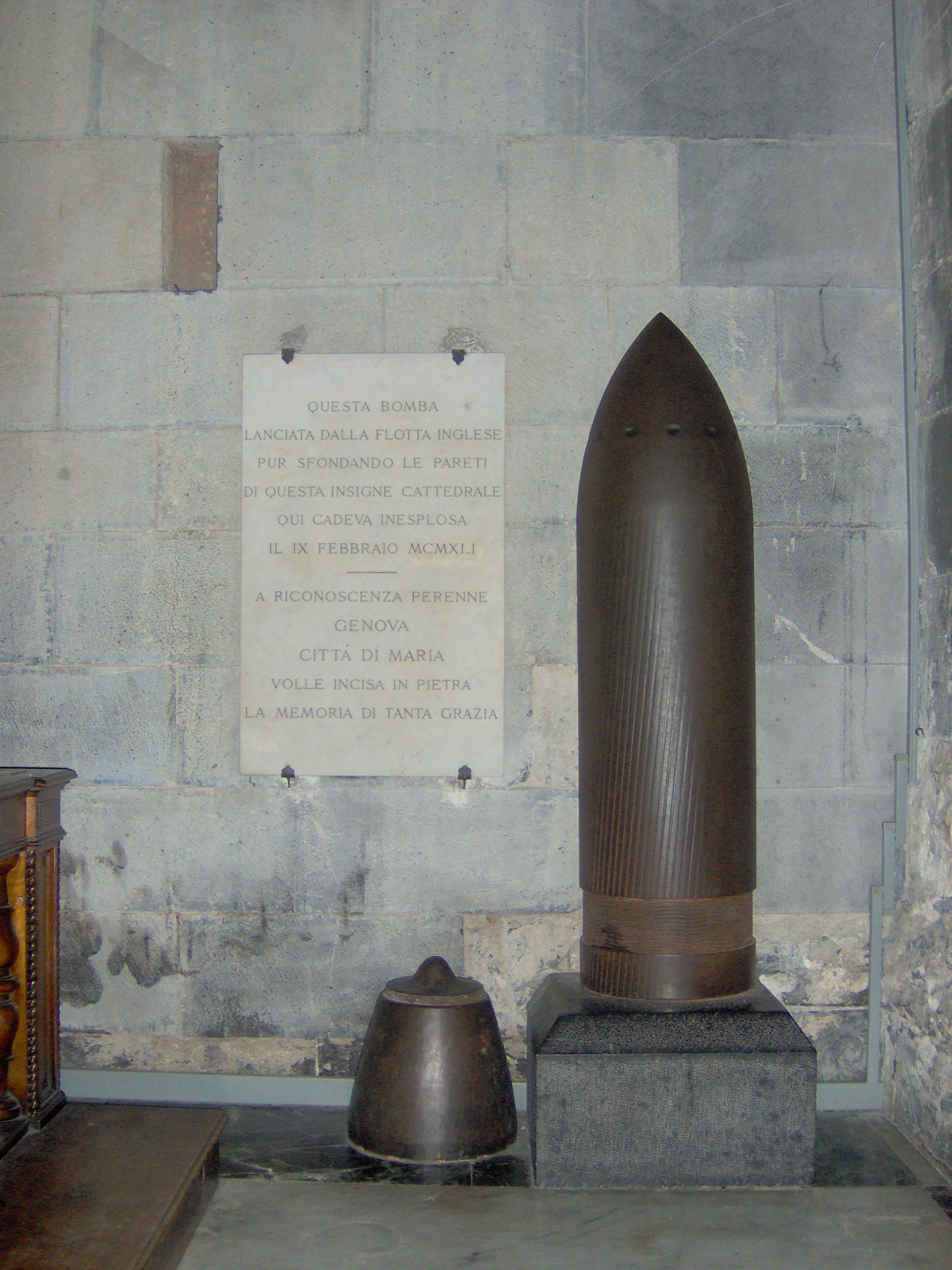
A 15-inch naval shell that struck the San Lorenzo cathedral without exploding

Another and far heavier naval bombardment of Genoa was carried out on 9 February 1941 by the British Force H. The battlecruiser HMS Renown, battleship HMS Malaya and light cruiser HMS Sheffield, along with the aircraft carrier HMS Ark Royal (whose aircraft launched diversionary attacks on La Spezia and Livorno), sailed from Gibraltar and shelled the city in the early morning, firing altogether 273 15-inch shells, 782 6-inch shells and 400 4,5-inch shells. Only one third of the shells fired hit the targets; industrial plants did not suffer heavy damage, and the only two warships undergoing work in the shipyards, the battleship Duilio and the destroyer Bersagliere, remained unscathed. Of 55 merchant ships in the harbour, two were sunk (steamer Ezilda Croce and floating orphanage Garaventa), two were seriously damaged (steamers Salpi and Garibaldi) and twenty-nine suffered splinter damage. The city instead suffered serious damage, with the destruction of 250 buildings, 144 dead and 272 wounded among the civilian population, and 2,500 people left homeless. Reaction by the coastal batteries was ineffectual, while the Italian battlefleet sortied from La Spezia to intercept Force H, but was unable to do so owing to poor cooperation between the Navy and the Regia Aeronautica (Italian Royal Air Force) reconnaissance aircraft.

== Air raids ==
=== 11/12 June 1940 ===
First air raid on Genoa; together with the simultaneous attack on Turin, this was the first air raid suffered by an Italian city during the war. Two British bombers, part of a group of 36 that had taken off from bases in England (another two were lost), dropped five tons of bombs, causing little damage and few casualties.

=== 13/14 June 1940 ===
Air raid by nine British aircraft of the Fleet Air Arm.

=== 15/16 June 1940 ===
Eight Vickers Wellington bombers from Haddock Force, based in Provence, attacked the Ansaldo shipyards and the Piaggio plants.

=== 16/17 June 1940 ===
Another three bombers of Haddock Force, out of twenty-two that had taken off from bases in Provence, attacked again Ansaldo and Piaggio.

=== 2/3 September 1940 ===
A raid by Royal Air Force Bomber Command hit the city, causing two deaths among the civilians.

=== 20/21 October 1940 ===
Another raid by the Bomber Command.

=== 10/11 September 1941 ===
76 Bomber Command aircraft attacked Genoa and Turin (five were shot down). In Genoa, the bombs fell on the city.

=== 28/29 September 1941 ===
Raid by 41 Bomber Command aircraft, three of which were lost. The bombs fell on the city; some dispersed bombers dropped their loads on La Spezia and Savona.

=== 12 April 1942 ===
Raid by eighteen Bomber Command aircraft (many of which failed to reach Genoa and attacked Savona and Imperia instead), which dropped 9.5 tons of bombs.

=== 22/23 October 1942 ===
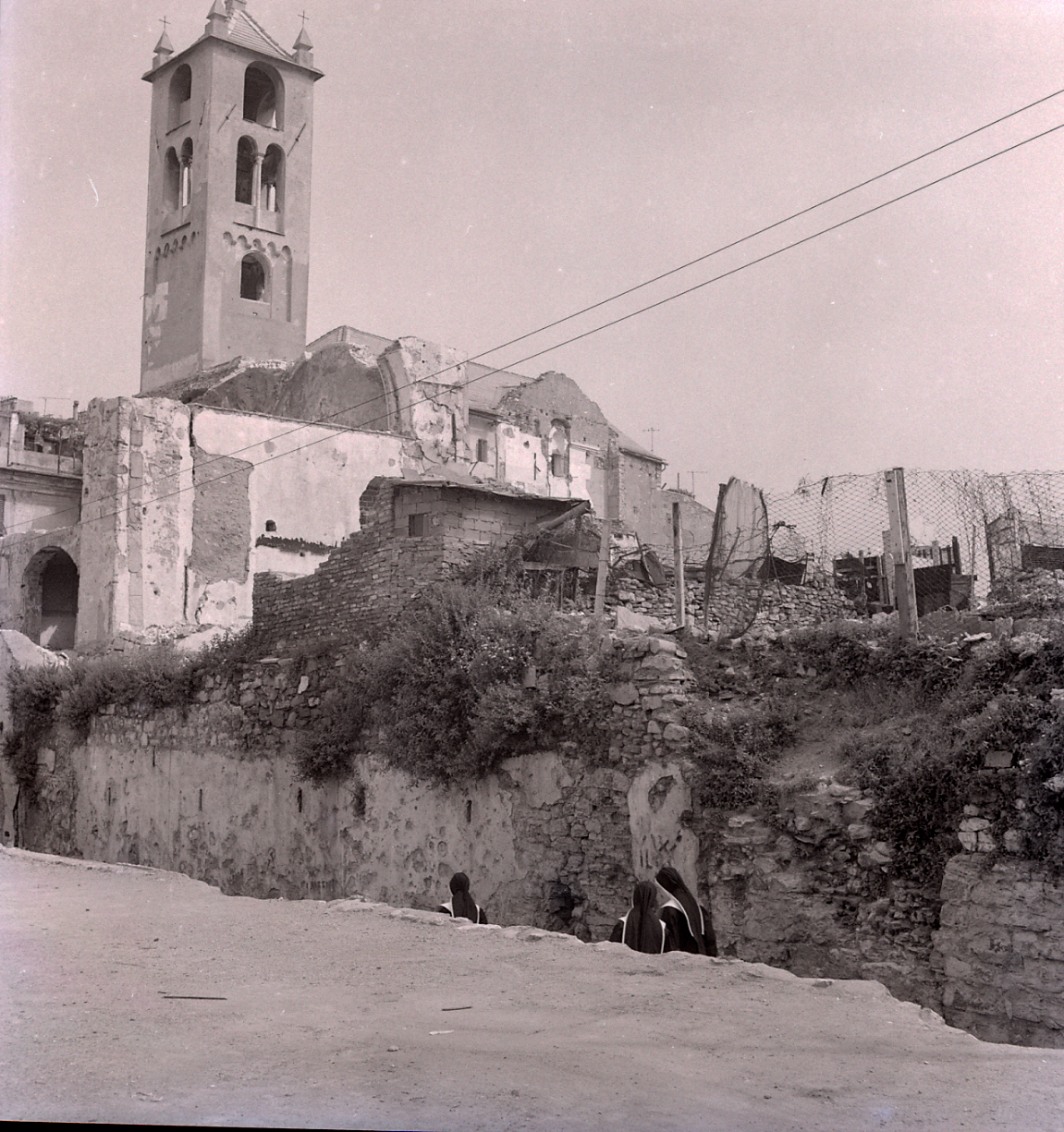
Ruins of the church of Santa Maria in Passione

First area bombing raid on Genoa, carried out by the Bomber Command with a hundred Avro Lancaster bombers (out of 112 that had taken off from bases in England) which dropped 179 tons of bombs on the city (Piazza De Ferrari was the aiming point). The old city centre, the harbour, the shipyards, and the eastern suburbs were hit; among the damaged buildings were the Genova Brignole railway station, the Pammatone hospital, the churches of Santa Maria in Passione and Sant'Agostino, the medieval "portico" of Sottoripa, Palazzo Spinola, Palazzo San Giorgio and the Doge's Palace. Thirty-nine civilians were killed. This was the first area bombing raid on an Italian city, with ample use of incendiary devices, causing damage and fires on an unprecedented scale (some fires were still raging after twenty-four hours) and deeply impressing the population. On the following morning, Genoa was visited by the King and Queen; Victor Emmanuel III visited the hardest hit districts, while Queen Elena visited the wounded in the hospitals.

=== 23/24 October 1942 ===
Second area bombing of Genoa, carried out by 95 Short Stirling and Handley Page Halifax bombers, that dropped 144 tons of bombs. Bad weather dispersed many of the 122 bombers that had originally taken off from England (three of which were lost), with many erroneously attacking Savona (mistaken for Genoa), killing 55 people, Vado Ligure or Turin; in Genoa, material damage was relatively light (among the damaged buildings were the Basilica of the Santissima Annunziata, the Gio Vincenzo Imperiale Palace and the Paganini Theatre, which was destroyed and never rebuilt), to the point that the Bomber Command considered this raid a failure (unlike the previous and following ones, all of which were considered as successful and well concentrated) The panic caused by the previous night's attack caused a mass stampede at the entrance of an air raid shelter near Porta Soprana, in which at least 354 people (according to the official toll; others estimate 500) lost their lives.

=== 6/7 November 1942 ===
Third area bombing, in which 65 RAF bombers (out of 73 that had taken off from bases in England; two were shot down) dropped 115 tons of bombs. The central and eastern districts were hit, with damage to the church of San Donato and to Villa Pallavicini; twenty civilians were killed.

=== 7/8 November 1942 ===
Fourth and heaviest area bombing raid: 143 bombers (out of 175 that had taken off from England; six were lost) dropped 237 tons of bombs on the city and the Ansaldo shipyard, killing 23 people. The shipyard and the eastern districts were hit, with damage to the basilica of the Santissima Annunziata, to Sottoripa, and to Doria, Spinola, Arcivescovile and Accademia Ligustica palaces. This was the heaviest air raid suffered by an Italian city since the beginning of the war (a record that was surpassed, a few days later, by the 20 November raid on Turin).

=== 13/14 November 1942 ===
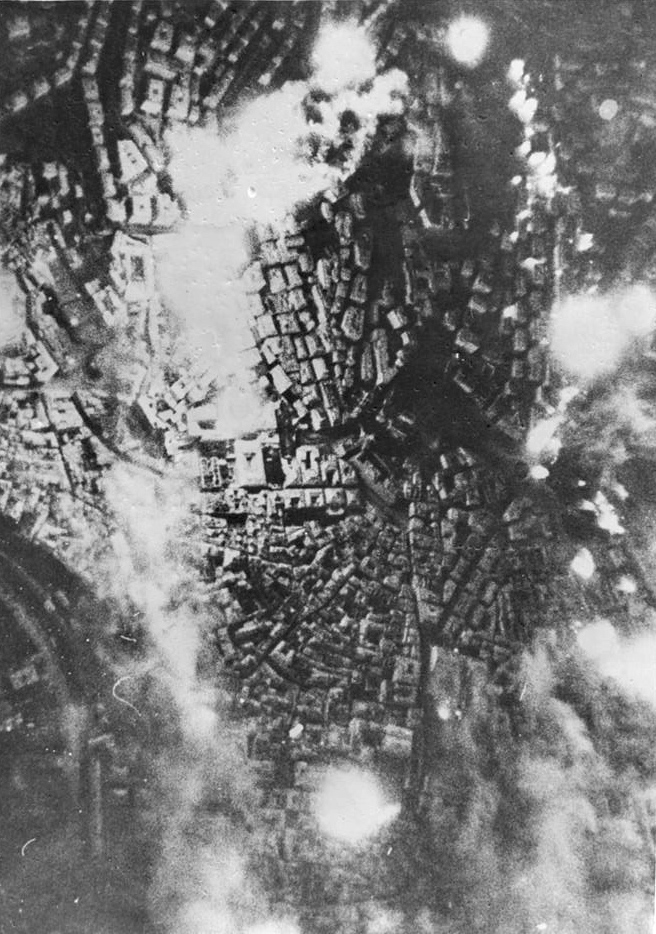
Aerial photo taken during the 13/14 November 1942 raid on Genoa

Fifth "area bombing" raid on Genoa, carried out by seventy Bomber Command aircraft (out of 76 that had taken off from England) which dropped 80 tons of explosive bombs and 47 tons of incendiary bombs. Both the Ansaldo and the city were targeted; both were hit, with damage to the Sampierdarena marshalling yard, the Brignole district, the Galliera hospital, the Basilica of San Siro, the church of Santo Stefano, the Spinola and Accademia Ligustica palaces, the Loggia della Mercanzia. Ten civilians were killed.

=== 15/16 November 1942 ===
Sixth area attack; 68 bombers (of 78 that had taken off from England) dropped 115 tons of bombs on the city, hitting both the city (including the church of the saints Cosma and Damiano, the basilica of San Siro, la basilica of Santa Maria Assunta and Palazzo Cattaneo) and the harbour, and causing five deaths. The six raids on Genoa in the autumn of 1942 destroyed or badly damaged 1,250 buildings. 1,996 flats were destroyed or badly damaged, 1,249 damaged and rendere partially uninhabitable, 4,438 suffered light damage; in some districts, over a third of all buildings were destroyed or badly damaged. Damage to the port facilities, instead, were not heavy and were repaired in a short time. Civilian casualties (451 deaths) were relatively light when compared to the extent of the damage; this was largely due to the greater availability (both in number and capacity) of air raid shelters in Genoa, many of which were located in tunnels and underground passages, without buildings that could collapse and bury them (one of the main causes of death in air raids). Bomber Command losses amounted to nine bombers, two of which had collided in mid air.

=== 7/8 August 1943 ===
Last area raid, carried out by 72 Lancaster bombers of the Bomber Command. 169 tons of bombs (94 tons of explosive bombs, including twenty-five 4,000-lb blockbuster bombs, and 75 tons of incendiaries) fell on the city, killing about one hundred people (a worse toll was avoided because a large part of the population had already left the city) and leaving 13,000 homeless, and on the harbour, sinking destroyer Freccia. The old city centre was hit the hardest, especially the area surrounding Piazza De Ferrari (again used as "aiming point": 63 of the 72 bombers dropped their load within three miles), Piazza Corvetto and the Carignano district, as well as the Teatro Carlo Felice, the basilica of San Siro and the churches of the Consolazione and of Santo Stefano. This attack was part of a series of raids on Italian cities launched by the Allies after 25 July 1943 and targeting the public opinion in Italy, with the aim of pushing the Badoglio government to surrender; along with the bombs, thousands of propaganda leaflets were also dropped, carrying the message: "The government in Rome says: the war goes on. This is why our bombing goes on".

=== 21 October 1943 ===
First raid on Genoa, now occupied by the Germans, by the United States Army Air Force; the raid was carried out by 153 bombers of the Twelfth Air Force. The Armistice of Cassibile having brought an end to the period of area bombing aimed at weakening the morale of the population, the subsequent raids on Genoa were "precision" raids aimed at disabling the port facilities and factories engaged in wartime productions. Inaccurate bombing resulted in many bombs also falling on the city.

=== 29 October 1943 ===
133 bombers of the 12th U.S. Air Force attacked the marshalling yard and the Ansaldo, hitting both the targets and the city, killing about sixty people The Vigili del Fuoco (fire brigade) managed to save another thirty-people from under the rubble)and causing serious damage to the water and gas networks.

=== 30 October 1943 ===
Another raid by the marshalling yard and the Ansaldo, carried out by twenty bombers of the 12th U.S. Air Force. The bombs hit the city (especially the old city centre and the Sampierdarena and Rivarolo districts).

=== 9 November 1943 ===
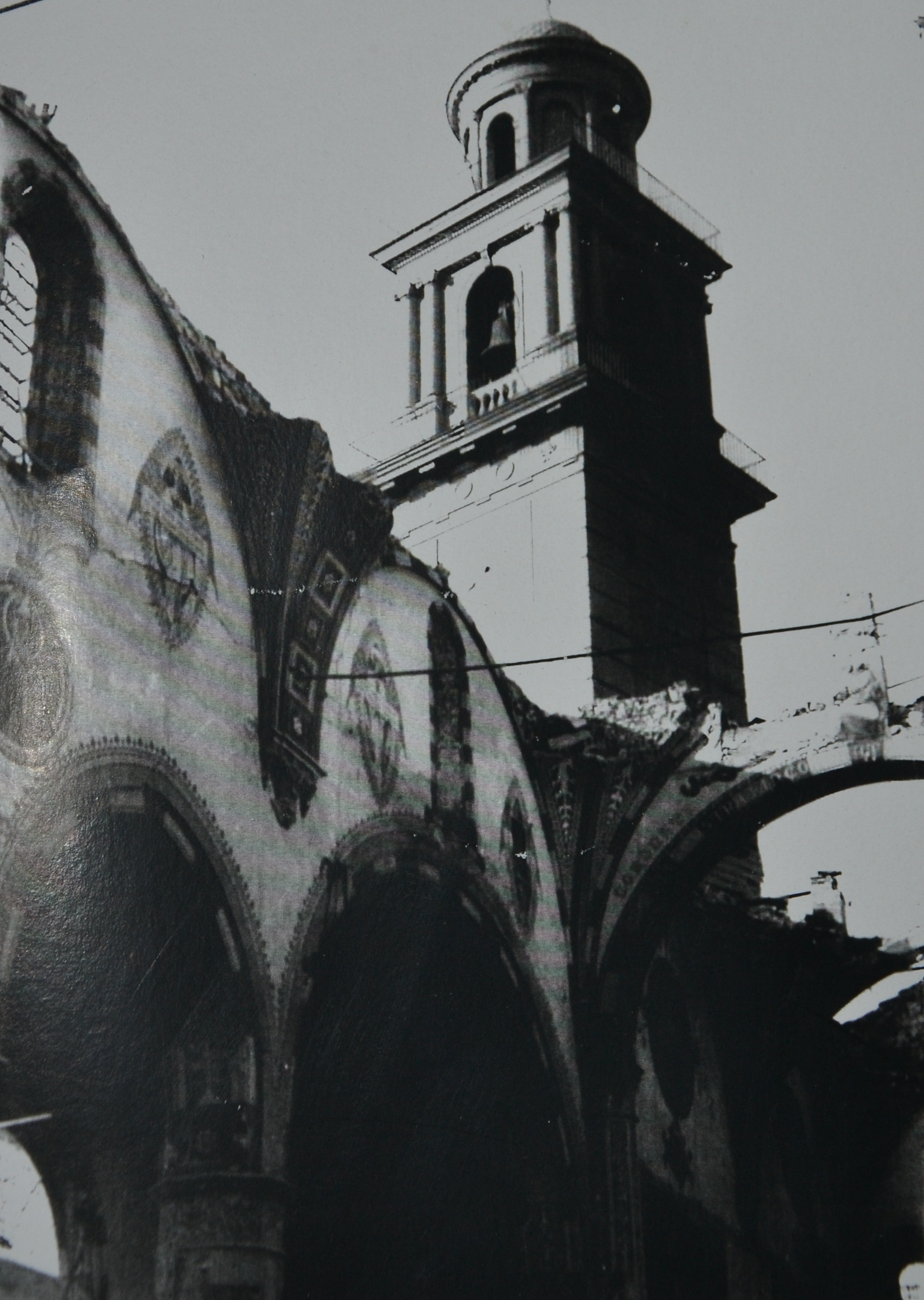
The ruins of the Sanctuary of Nostra Signora Incoronata

Raid by the 15th Air Force, targeting the Ansaldo. Both the objective and the city were hit (the Sanctuary of Nostra Signora Incoronata was almost completely destroyed).

=== 11 March 1944 ===
Raid by 66 RAF aircraft, targeting the marshalling yard. The bombs fell on Sestri, Pegli, Rivarolo, Sampierdarena and Cornigliano, killing sixteen civilians and wounding about twenty.

=== 19 April 1944 ===
Seven RAF bombers attacked the harbour.

=== 23 April 1944 ===
Another raid on the harbour, carried out by nine RAF bombers. The bombs fell on the city as well, causing thirteen victims among the civilians.

=== 28 April 1944 ===
Raid by 21 RAF bombers.

=== 29 April 1944 ===
Fifteen RAF bombers attacked the harbour; bombs also fell on the city, killing nine civilians.

=== 30 April 1944 ===
Raid by nine RAF bombers.

=== 1 May 1944 ===
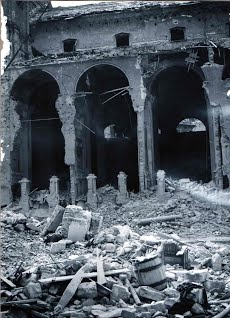
Damage to the basilica of the Santissima Annunziata

Raid on the harbour, by six RAF bombers. Bombs also fell on the city, killing two civilians.

=== 2 May 1944 ===
Raid by twelve RAF bombers.

=== 9 May 1944 ===
26 RAF bombers attacked the harbour. Bombs also fell on the city, killing four civilians.

=== 19 May 1944 ===
Raid by the 15th Air Force, targeting the harbour and the marshalling yard. The objectives were hit, but many of the bombs fell on the city (especially the old city centre; among the damaged buildings were the University, the Cathedral and the San Martino hospital), causing 111 deaths among the population.

=== 28 May 1944 ===
Another raid by Consolidated B-24 Liberator bombers of the 15th Air Force, targeting the harbour and the marshalling yard.

=== 4 June 1944 ===
Raid by 217 B-17 and B-24 bombers of the 15th Air Force on the marshalling yard. 497 tons of bombs were dropped, hitting both the target and the city (especially the Voltri, Rivarolo, Cornigliano and Sampierdarena districts), causing 93 dead and 130 wounded.

=== 7 June 1944 ===
Raid by the 15th Air Force, finding the primary target of Genoa overcast, the 15th AF targeting the nearby Voltri drydocks; these were hit, but so was the city.

=== 9 June 1944 ===
Another raid by the 15th U.S. Air Force. The bombs hit the city.

=== 20 June 1944 ===
An air raid killed twenty people in Sampierdarena.

=== 24 July 1944 ===
B-24 bombers of the 15th Air Force dropped 58,5 tons of bombs on the harbour, sinking the incomplete Capitani Romani-class cruiser Cornelio Silla but also hitting the city centre.

=== 2 August 1944 ===
Another raid by B-24 bombers of the 15th Air Force, targeting the harbour. The city was also hit, especially the old city centre and the San Vincenzo district, with heavy damage and considerable casualties.

=== 7 August 1944 ===
North American B-25 Mitchell and Martin B-26 Marauder medium bombers of the 12th Air Force attacked the port facilities and the road network.

=== 12–14 August 1944 ===
USAAF aircraft launched a series of attacks on coastal batteries in and around Genoa, in preparation for the landings in Southern France.

=== 13 August 1944 ===
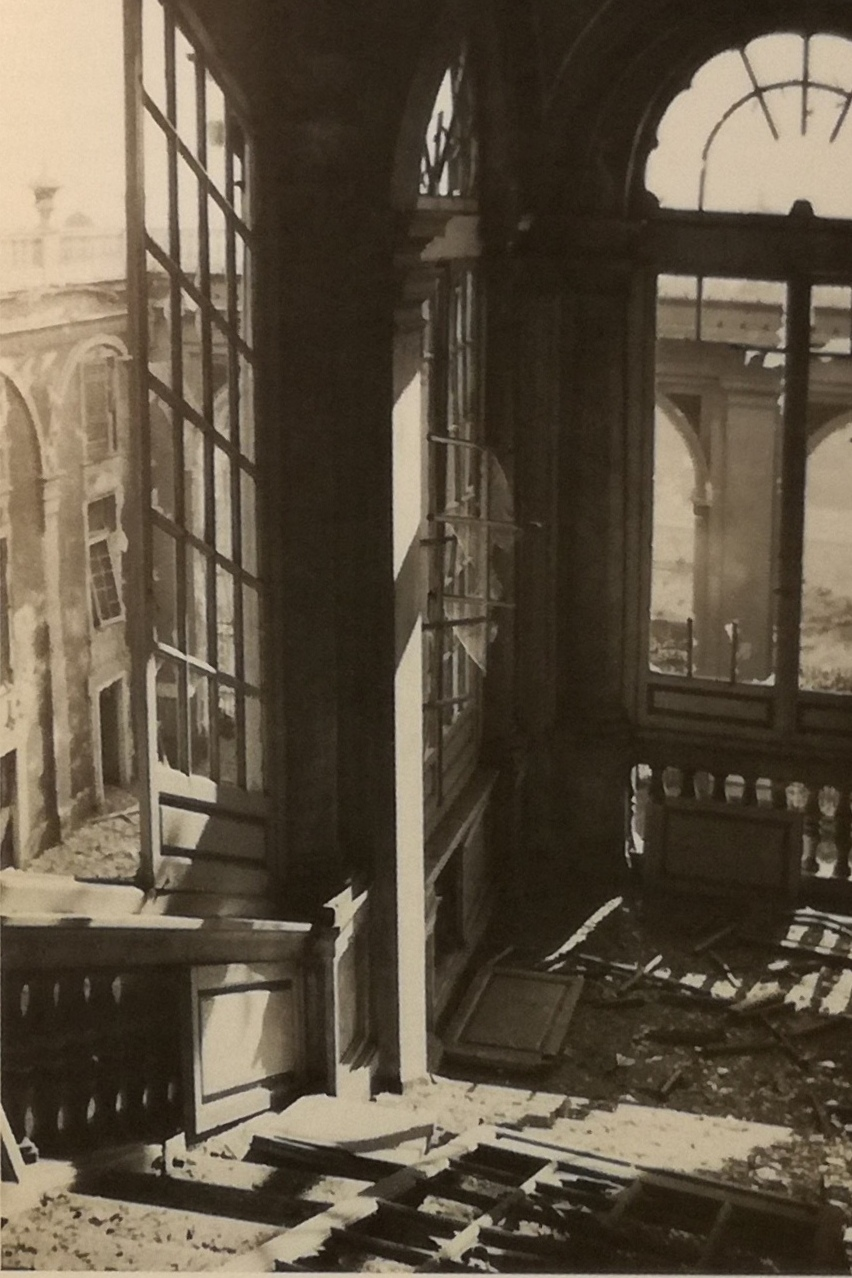
Damage to the Palazzo Reale in 1944

59 RAF bombers attacked the harbour, but also hit the city (the Palazzo Reale and the basilica of San Siro, among other things, suffered damage). About a hundred civilians lost their lives.

=== 4 September 1944 ===
144 Boeing B–17 Flying Fortress bombers of the 15th Air Force carried out a heavy air raid on the harbour. Several ships were sunk, including the German destroyer TA 33, former Italian Squadrista; the torpedo boat TA 28, former Italian Rigel; the submarines Aradam, UIT 5, UIT 6, and UIT 20, former Italian Sparide, Murena, and Grongo; the submarine chaser CS 11, the tug boats Capodistria, Tiravanti, Taormina and Senigallia; the minelayer Vallelunga; the corvette UJ 6085, former Italian Renna; the German military transports KT 14, KT 16, KT 19, KT 20, KT 43, KT 44, KT 45, and KT 46). Many bombs also fell on the city, causing heavy damage (among other buildings, the already damaged Teatro Carlo Felice was largely destroyed) and hundreds of victims (over three hundred, according to some sources): in the Grazie air raid shelter alone, 143 people were killed by a direct hit.

=== 7 March 1945 ===
Raid by 37 RAF bombers, targeting the marshalling yard.

== Damage and casualties ==
Air raids and naval bombardments on Genoa destroyed or damaged 11,183 buildings, destroying 265,000 rooms. The harbour, the city and the marshalling yard all suffered heavily; by April 1945, three quarters of all industrial plants were destroyed. In the closing days of the war, further damage to port facilities was caused by German troops, who blew up large sections of the breakwater, disabled dry docks, wrecked machinery, laid 140 mines in the harbour and scuttled dozens of vessels as blockships (by the end of the war, as many as 935 wrecks – 320 ships and 615 smaller craft and floating objects – lay in the harbour, part of them sunk by the air raids, part scuttled by the Germans). Two-thirds of all wrecks were salvaged between 1945 and 1948, and by that year the port facilities had been restored to 70% of their prewar capacity.

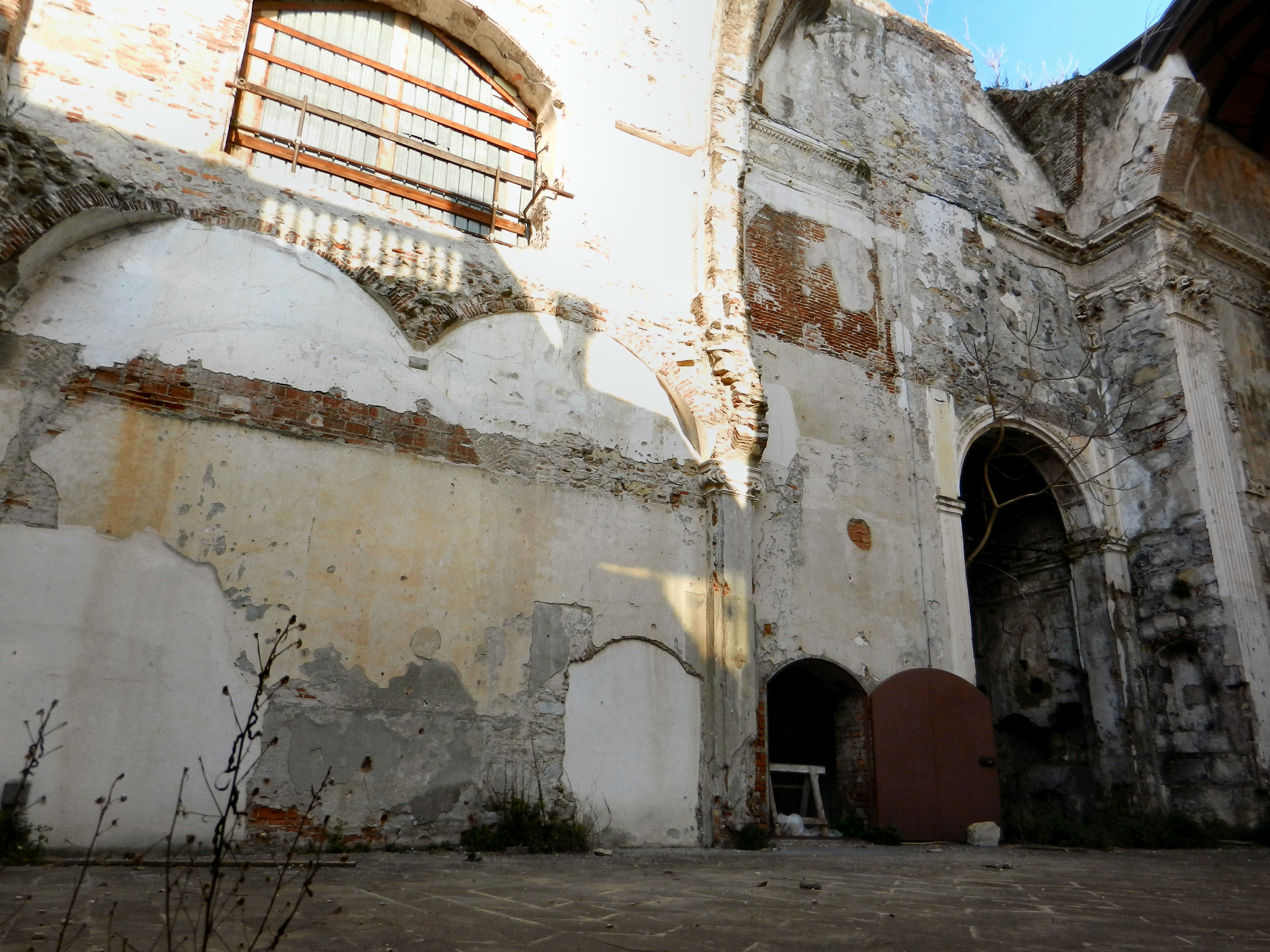
Remains of the church of Santa Maria in Passione as they appear today

Cultural heritage suffered considerable damage; 70 churches and 130 historic palaces were hit, with the partial or total destruction of the churches of Santa Maria in Passione, San Piero in Banchi and Santo Stefano, the Sanctuary of Nostra Signora Incoronata, Palazzo Arcivescovile, Palazzo Imperiale, Palazzo Balduino de Mari, Palazzo Spinola, Palazzo Gavotti, Palazzo Lamba Doria, Palazzo Pagano Doria, Palazzo San Giorgio, the Loggia della Mercanzia, the Villa delle Peschiere, the Villa Brignole Sale, the Teatro Carlo Felice, the Teatro del Falcone (destroyed and never rebuilt). Serious damage was also suffered by the Sanctuary of San Francesco da Paola, the basiliche of Santa Maria Assunta, Santissima Maria Annunziata del Vastato and San Siro, the churches of Saints Cosma and Damiano, San Giorgio, Santa Maria della Cella. Damage was likewise suffered by the churches of Santa Maria di Castello, Santi Vittore e Carlo, San Donato, by the Sanctuary of Madonna del Monte, by Villa Saluzzo Bombrini and Villa Giustiniani-Cambiaso. Almost all of the historic palaces on the Garibaldi and Balbi streets were hit, with serious damage to Palazzo Reale, Palazzo Balbi Piovera, Palazzo Durazzo-Pallavicini, Palazzo Bianco, Palazzo Rosso, Palazzo Campanella, Palazzo Podestà, and less heavy damage to Palazzo Doria-Tursi (where the city hall was located). The San Lorenzo Cathedral suffered relatively minor damage, as did Spinola di Pellicceria and other historic palaces.

About 2,000 civilians were killed; the homeless were over 120,000 already at the end of 1943.
