= Nicolò da Voltri =

Italian painter

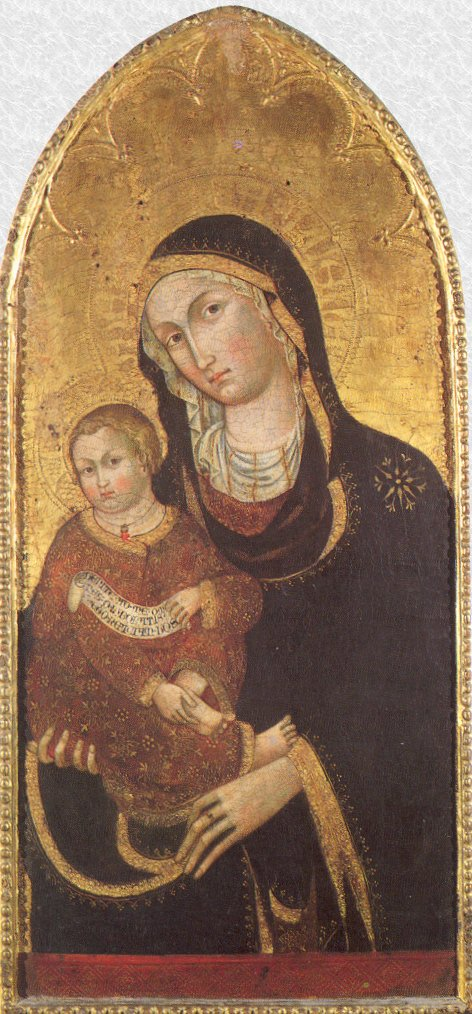
'Madonna and Child', by Nicolò da Voltri, end of 14th century, San Donato, Genoa

Nicolò da Voltri was an Italian painter who was active in Genoa from 1394 to 1417. He was the most important native painter in Liguria, a coastal region of northwestern Italy. His early development took place, probably in the 1370s, in the circle of Barnaba da Modena, who was active in Liguria between 1361 and 1383. Da Voltri was influenced by the Sienese School painter Taddeo di Bartolo, who was in Liguria between 1393 and 1398. Da Voltri's later paintings show clear influence of the Pisan painters working in Liguria between 1410 and 1420.
