= Barnaba da Modena =

Italian painter

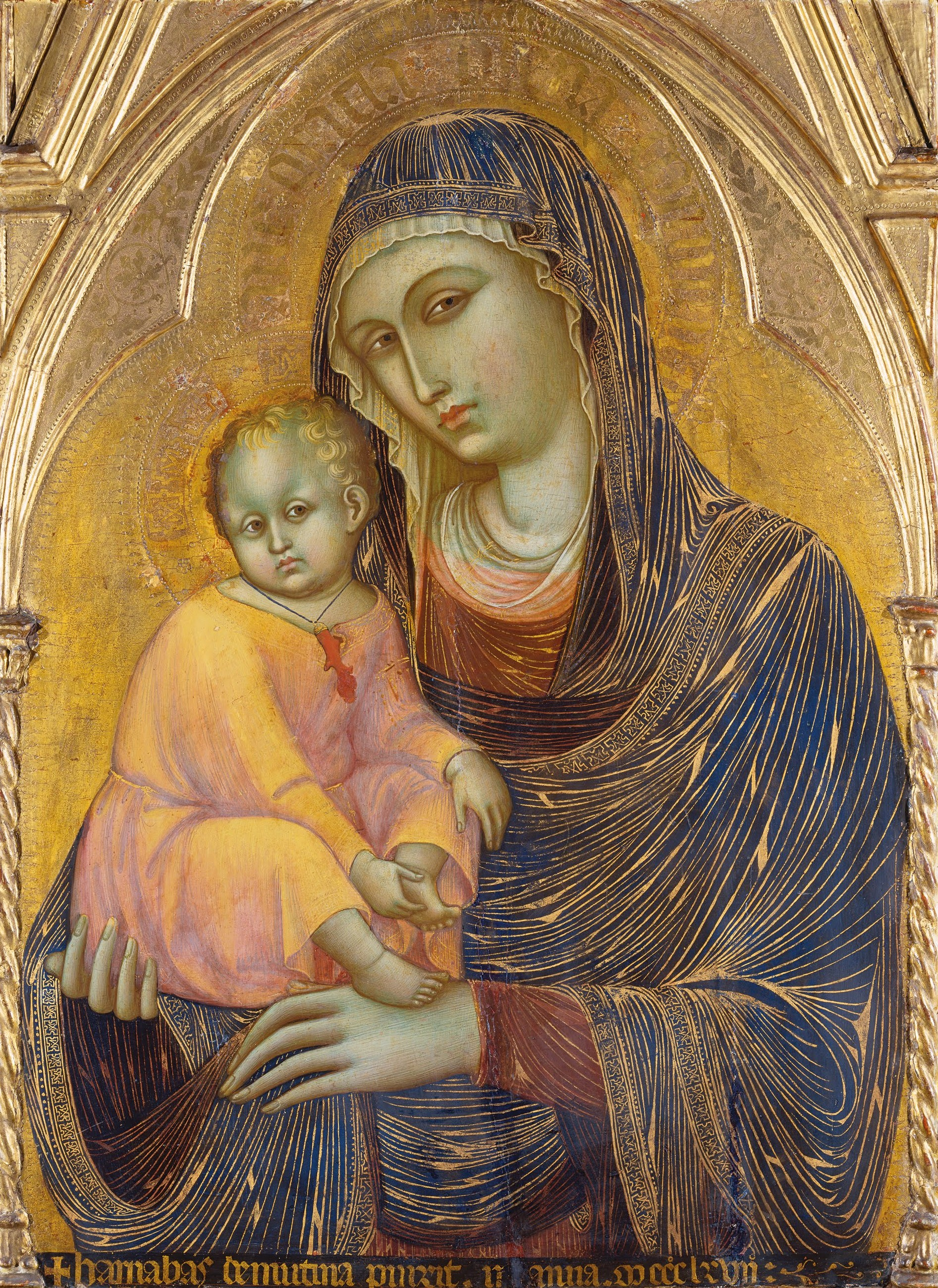
Madonna and Child, Städel

Barnaba da Modena (c. 1328-c.1386) was a mid-14th-century Italian painter who painted in the style of Byzantine art. He is considered the first Lombard painter of note and was active in Lombardy, Piedmont, and Pisa in Tuscany.

== Life ==
As his name indicates, the artist was a native of Modena (Emilia). The first records regarding Barnaba date to 1361 and 1362 when he had already become a Genoese citizen and was hiring Tuscan assistants. His earliest dated paintings relate to his activities in Genoa. He produced paintings for the Palazzo Ducale in Genoa in 1364. His earliest known painting is a polyptych of the Virgin and Child with Saints (Palazzo Bianco, Genoa), which combines the Gothic style of Tuscan polyptychs with Emilian design. Another work, a Virgin and Child (Museum of Fine Arts, Boston), shows the influence of Sienese painting in the rounded faces and the gold-striated highlights on Mary's mantle.

He was active in 1370 in Turin. A painting (1377) by Barnaba was documented by Tiraboschi in the church of San Francesco in Alba.

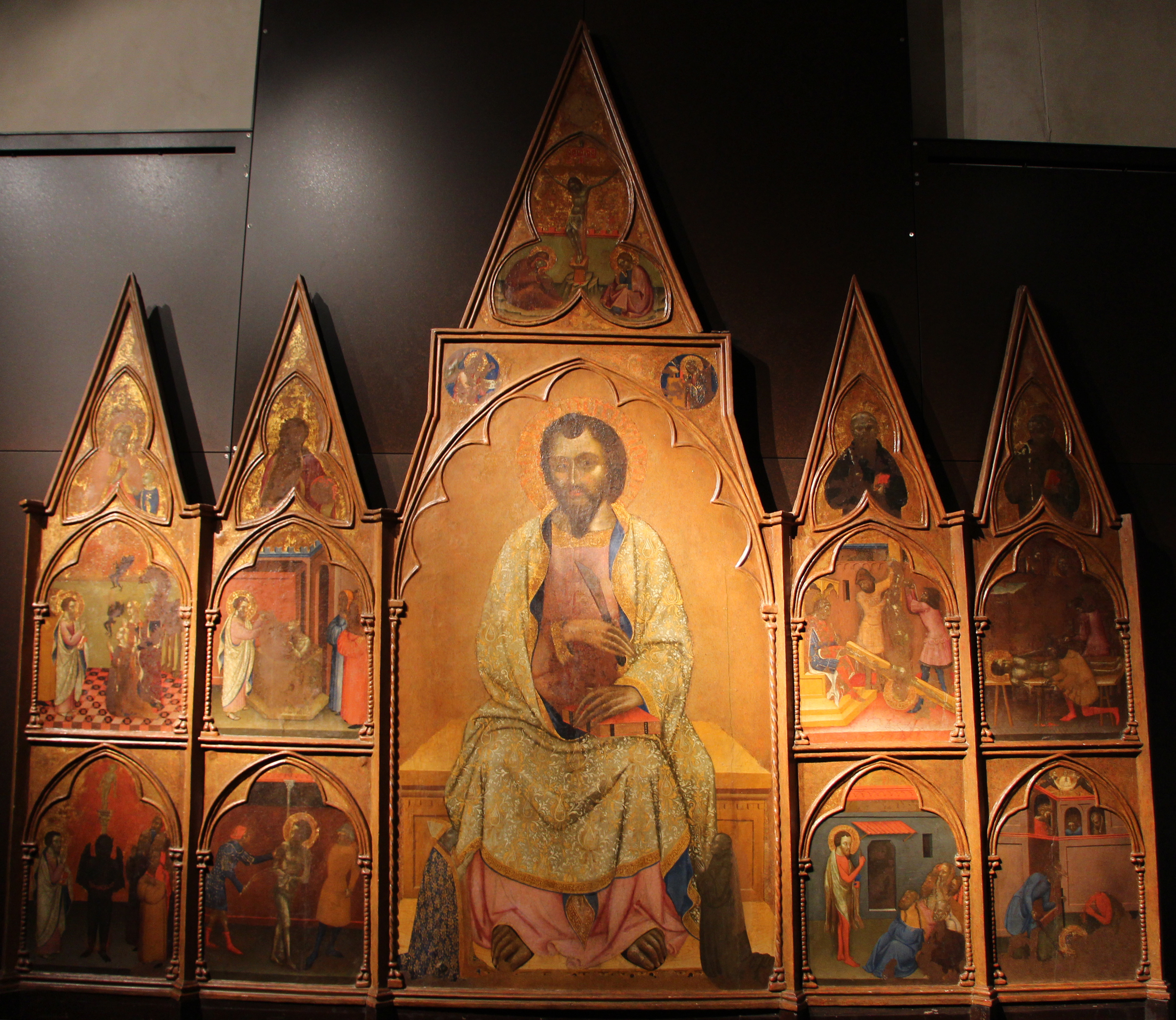
Christ with Apostles and Saints

Barnaba likely spent time in Pisa around 1380.

== Work ==
Barnaba was a prolific artist who left about 50 works. He was successful in Genoa thanks to his adherence to the older style of Byzantine painting that was still very popular in the city. This explains his compositional schemes and the use of gold highlights and golden backgrounds, which are typical of Byzantine painting.

An eclectic artist who did not follow the new trends that had developed in the 14th century, Barnaba was able to achieve a debt of feeling in his early works through his refined technique. Barnaba dominated painting in later 14th-century Genoa and possibly even in Pisa. His follower Nicolò da Voltri continued in his imagery and style in Liguria until c. 1420.
