= Palazzo Spinola di Pellicceria =

Palazzo Tolot Spinola di Pellicceria
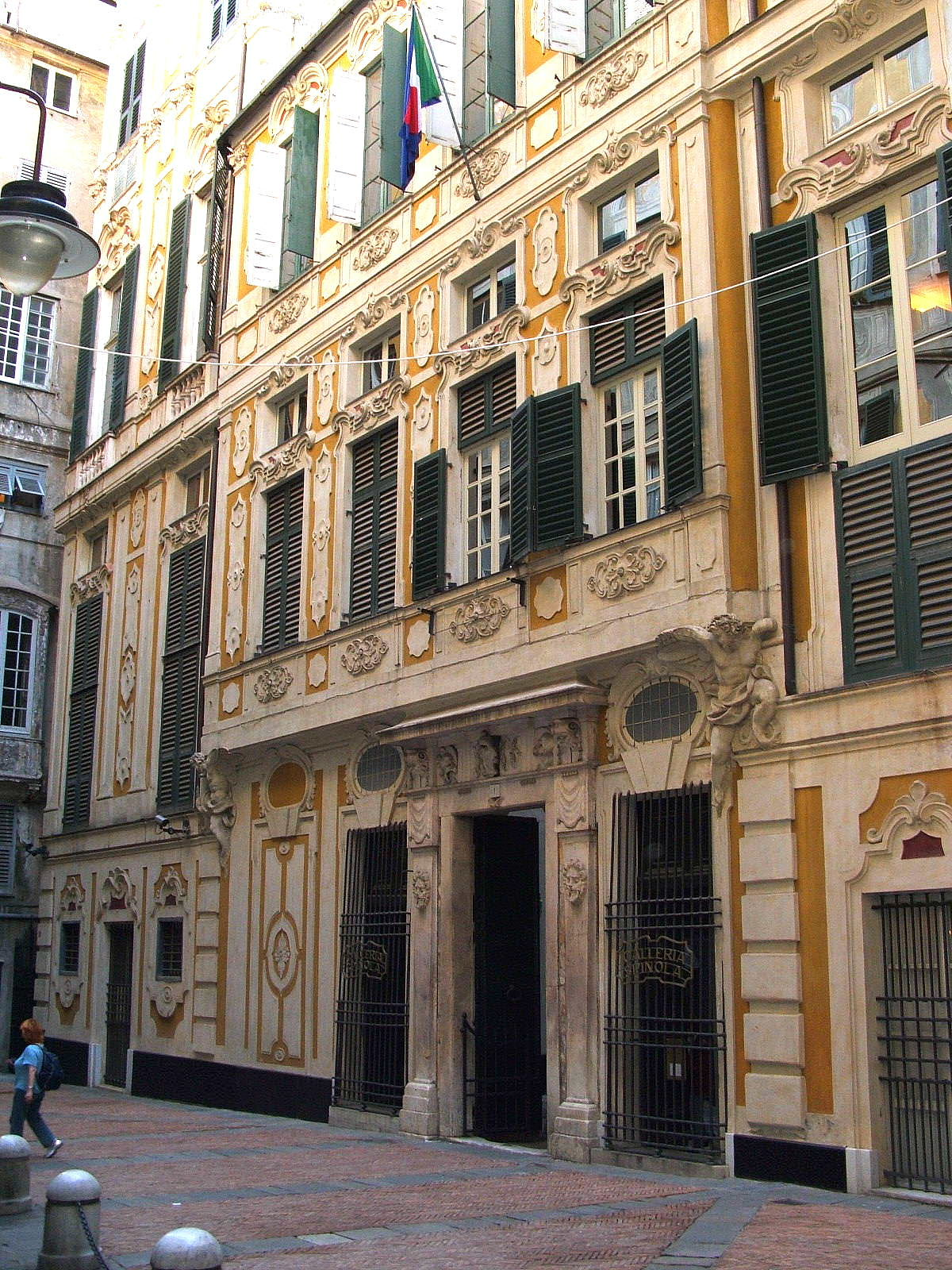
- Facade of Palazzo Tolot Spinola di Pellicceria
- Alternative names: Palazzo Francesco Grimaldi

General information
- Status: Intact
- Type: Palace
- Architectural style: Mannerist
- Location: Genoa, Italy
- Address: 1, Piazza di Pellicceria
- Coordinates: 44°24′38.3″N 8°55′51.3″E
- Named for: Francesco Grimaldi
- Completed: 1593
- Renovated: 17th–18th centuries
- Owner: Italian government

Website
- www.palazzospinola.beniculturali.it

UNESCO World Heritage Site
- Part of: Genoa: Le Strade Nuove and the system of the Palazzi dei Rolli
- Criteria: Cultural: (ii)(iv)
- Reference: 1211
- Inscription: 2006 (30th Session)

The Palazzo Spinola di Pellicceria, also known as Palazzo Francesco Grimaldi, is a palace located in piazza di Pellicceria in the historical center of Genoa, Northwestern Italy. The palace was one of the 163 Palazzi dei Rolli of Genoa, the selected private residences where the notable guests of the Republic of Genoa were hosted during State visits. On 13 July 2006 it was added to the list of 42 palaces which now form the UNESCO World Heritage Site Genoa: Le Strade Nuove and the system of the Palazzi dei Rolli. It is currently owned by the Ministry of Cultural Heritage and Activities and Tourism and houses the National Gallery of Art in Palazzo Spinola (National Gallery of Palazzo Spinola).

== History ==
The funds for the initial construction of this palace was present in the will of Francesco Grimaldi, made prior to 1593, when construction began upon medieval foundations at the site. The palace was included in the Rolli or list of aristocratic residences, that could be used by the government for hosting prominent visitors.

An etching of its façade is included in Peter Paul Rubens's 1622 book I Palazzi di Genova, printed in Antwerp in 1622. The Grimaldi family commissioned the fresco decorations by Lorenzo De Ferrari and Lazzaro Tavarone. The ceiling frescoes by Tavarone depict: the Siege of Lisbon by Duke of Alba (first floor) and the Triumph of Ranieri Grimaldi in 1304 over the Flemish fleet at Zierikzee (second floor).

The palace belonged to the House of Grimaldi until 1641-1650, when it was transferred to Ansaldo Pallavicini, a brother in law of Tommaso Grimaldi, in order to settle a debt. Ansaldo was responsible for closing the open loggia of the first floor. The palace eventually passed through marriage from the Pallavicini to the Doria family, when Anna Maria Pallavicino married to Gerolamo Doria. In the 18th century it again passed through marriage to become the property of the House of Spinola, when Maddalena Doria married to Niccolò Spinola. Maddalena directed the Rococo refurbishment in the mid-18th century, and engaged Lorenzo De Ferrari, Giovanni Battista Natali and Sebastiano Galeotti to paint the quadratura and decoration. She also commissioned the Gallery of Mirrors. Her grandson, Paolo Francesco Spinola, however was forced during the Napoleonic occupation to sell many works of art; his portrait (1794) by Angelica Kauffman is on display in the palace. By 1830 the palace was owned by the Tollot Family who would give it to Tito and Ferdinando Pignone in 1875.

The building has characteristics typical of late 16th-century Genoese palaces, having an entrance hall and an inner courtyard. The palace also had an extensive art collection, including paintings by Luca Cambiasi, Bernardo Castello and Bernardo Strozzi.

The third floor of the palace was destroyed during bombing during World War II. In 1958, the marquis Paolo and Franco Spinola donated the building, complete with its furnishings, artworks, silverware, ceramics, etchings and books, to the Italian government. The damaged part was subsequently rebuilt, and it has housed the National Gallery of Palazzo Spinola since 1993.

== Collection ==
Among the works of art in the collection are:

- Praying Virgin by Joos van Cleve
- Allegory of the Peace and the War by Luca Giordano
- Portrait of a nun by Bernardo Strozzi
- Ecce Homo by Antonello da Messina
- Equestrian portrait of Giovanni Carlo Doria by Rubens
- Justice statue by Giovanni Pisano
- Putti for Capella Grimaldi by Giambologna and Pietro Francavilla

== See also ==
- Genoa: Le Strade Nuove and the system of the Palazzi dei Rolli

== Bibliography ==
- Gioconda Pomella (2007), Guida Completa ai Palazzi dei Rolli Genova, Genova, De Ferrari Editore(ISBN 9788871728155)
- Mauro Quercioli (2008), I Palazzi dei Rolli di Genova, Roma, Libreria dello Stato (ISBN 9788824011433)
- Fiorella Caraceni Poleggi (2001), Palazzi Antichi e Moderni di Genova raccolti e disegnati da Pietro Paolo Rubens (1652), Genova, Tormena Editore (ISBN 9788884801302)
- Mario Labò (2003), I palazzi di Genova di P.P. Rubens, Genova, Nuova Editrice Genovese

== Gallery ==
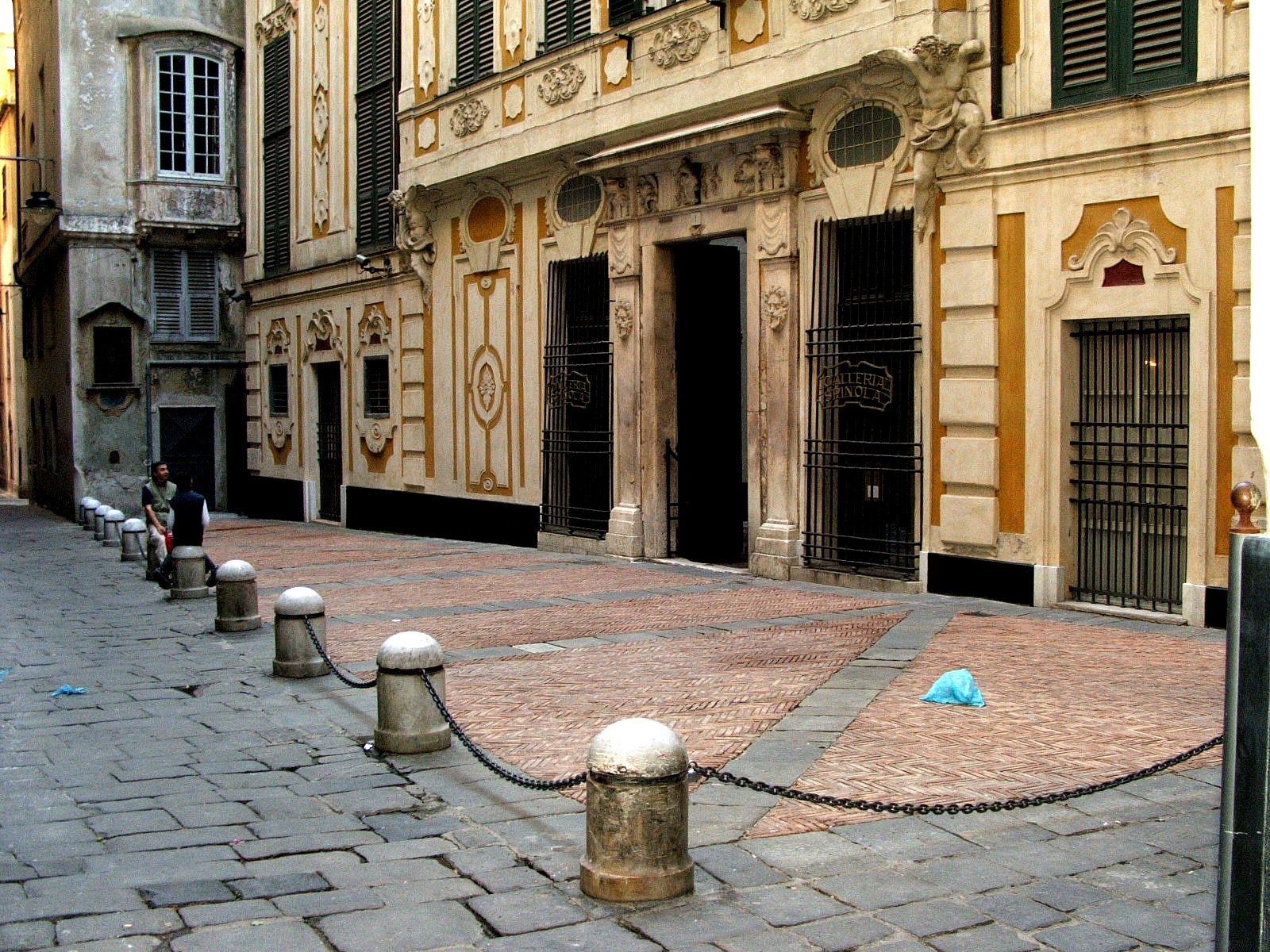
Façade in Piazza di Pellicceria

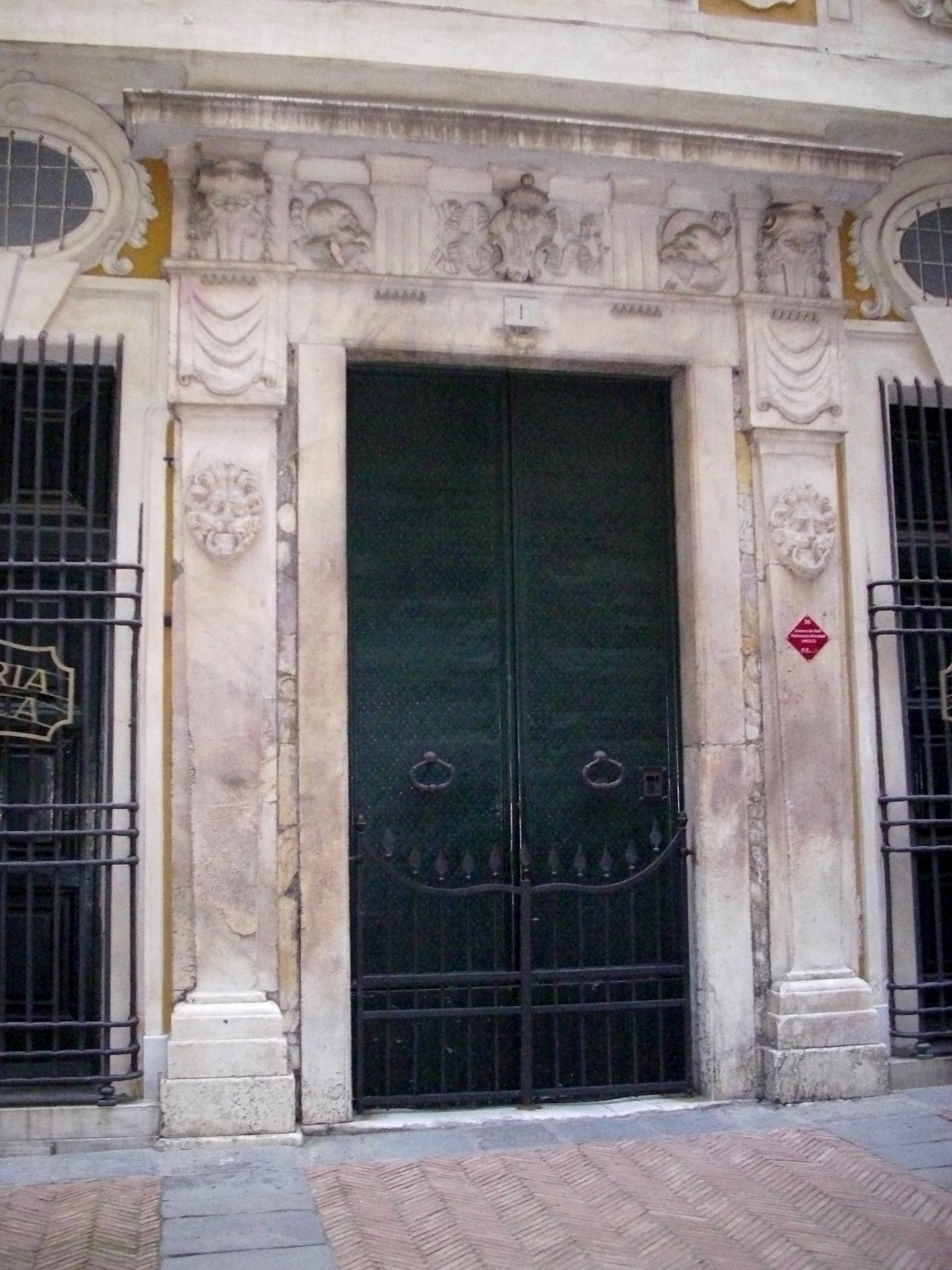
Portal in Piazza di Pellicceria

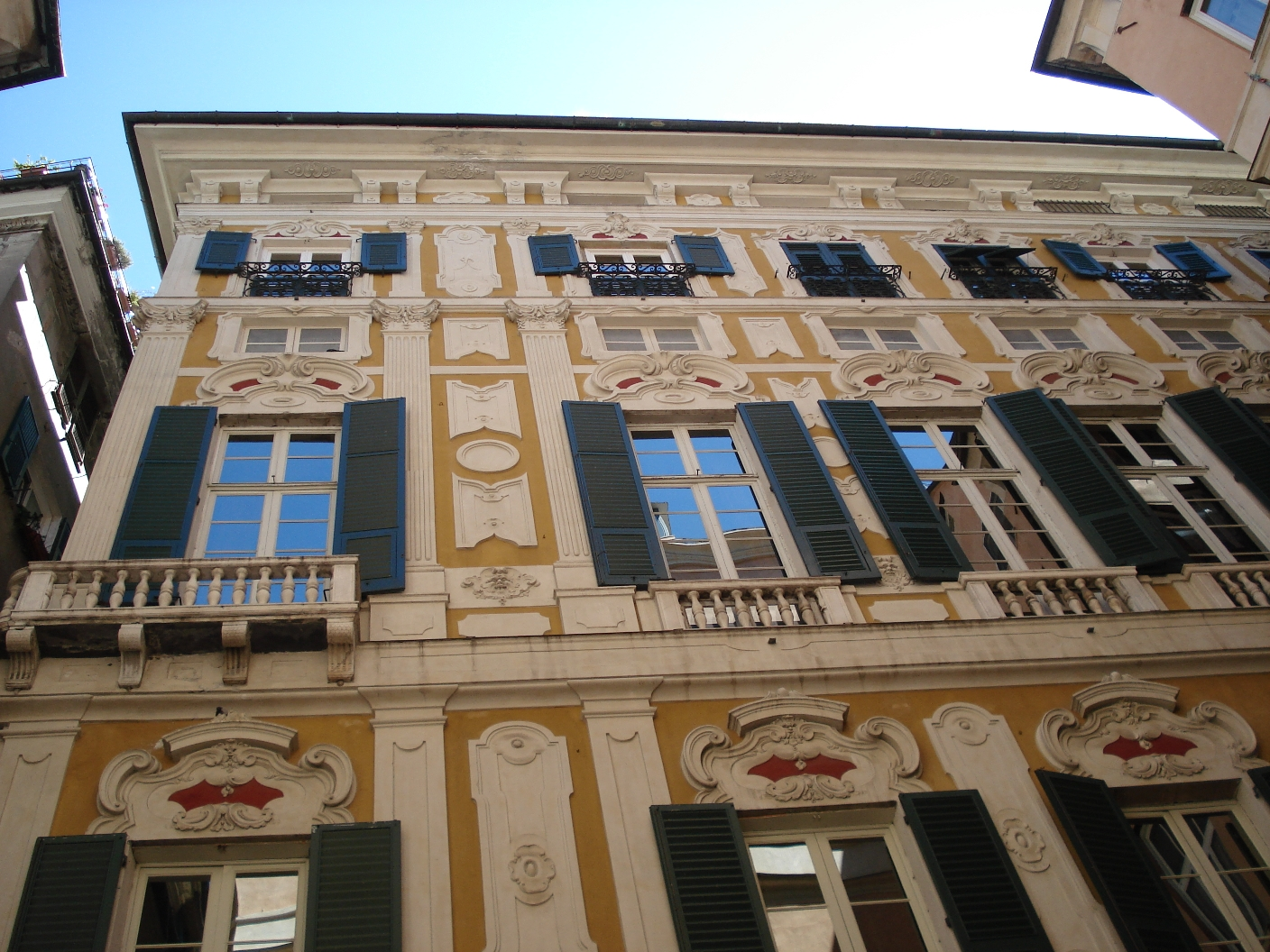
Façade in Piazza Inferiore di Pellicceria

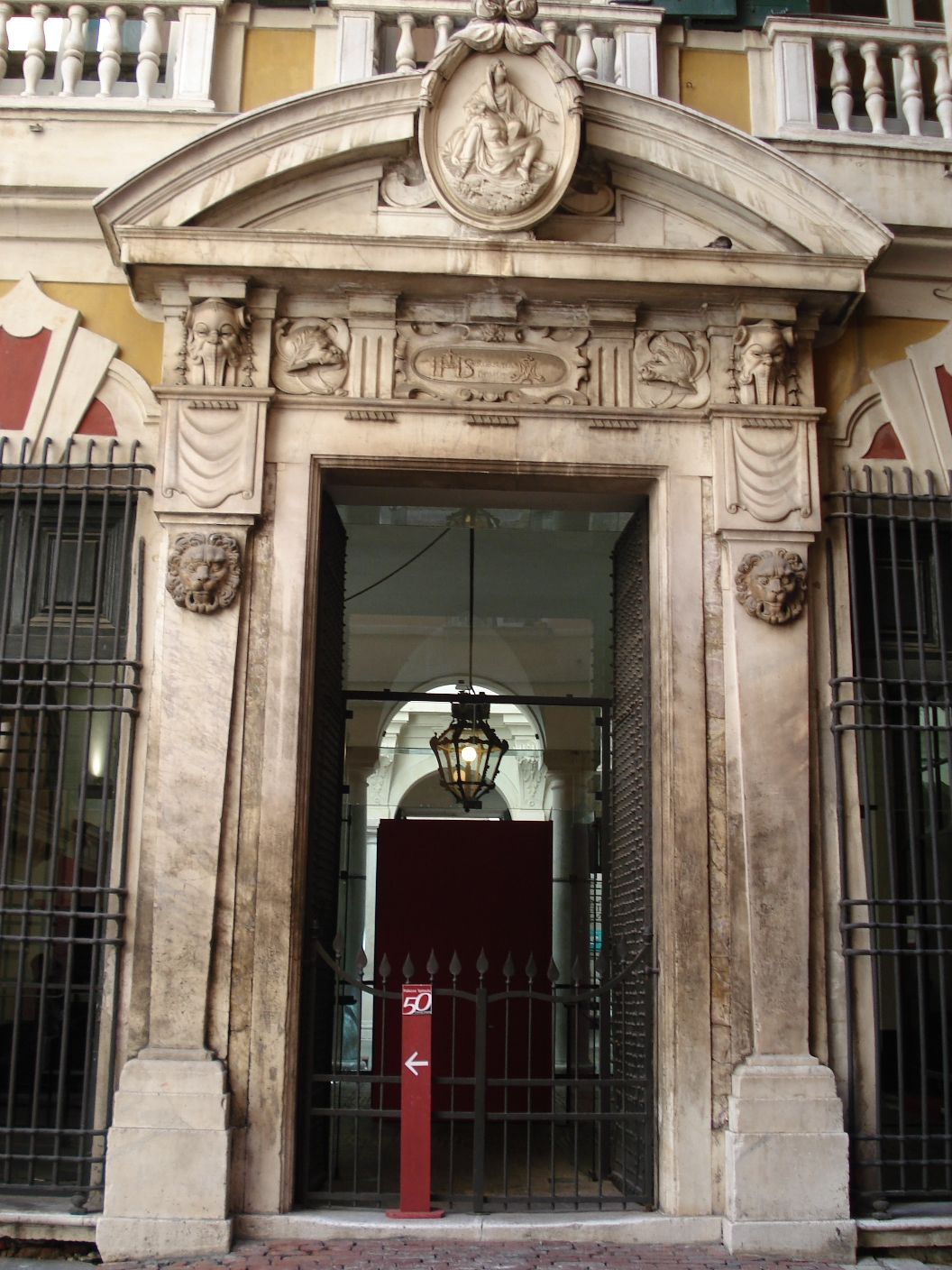
Portal in Piazza Inferiore di Pellicceria

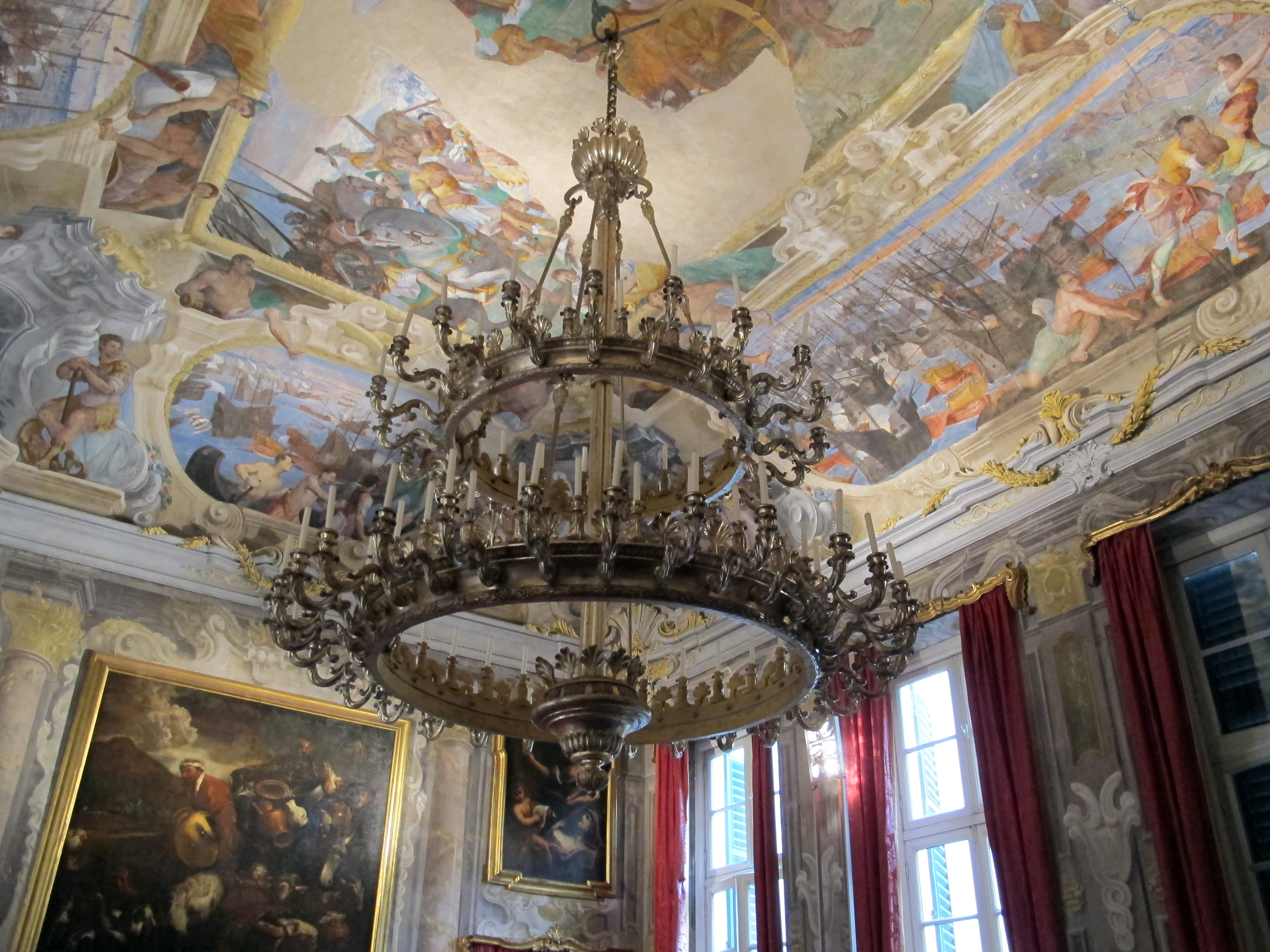
Interior

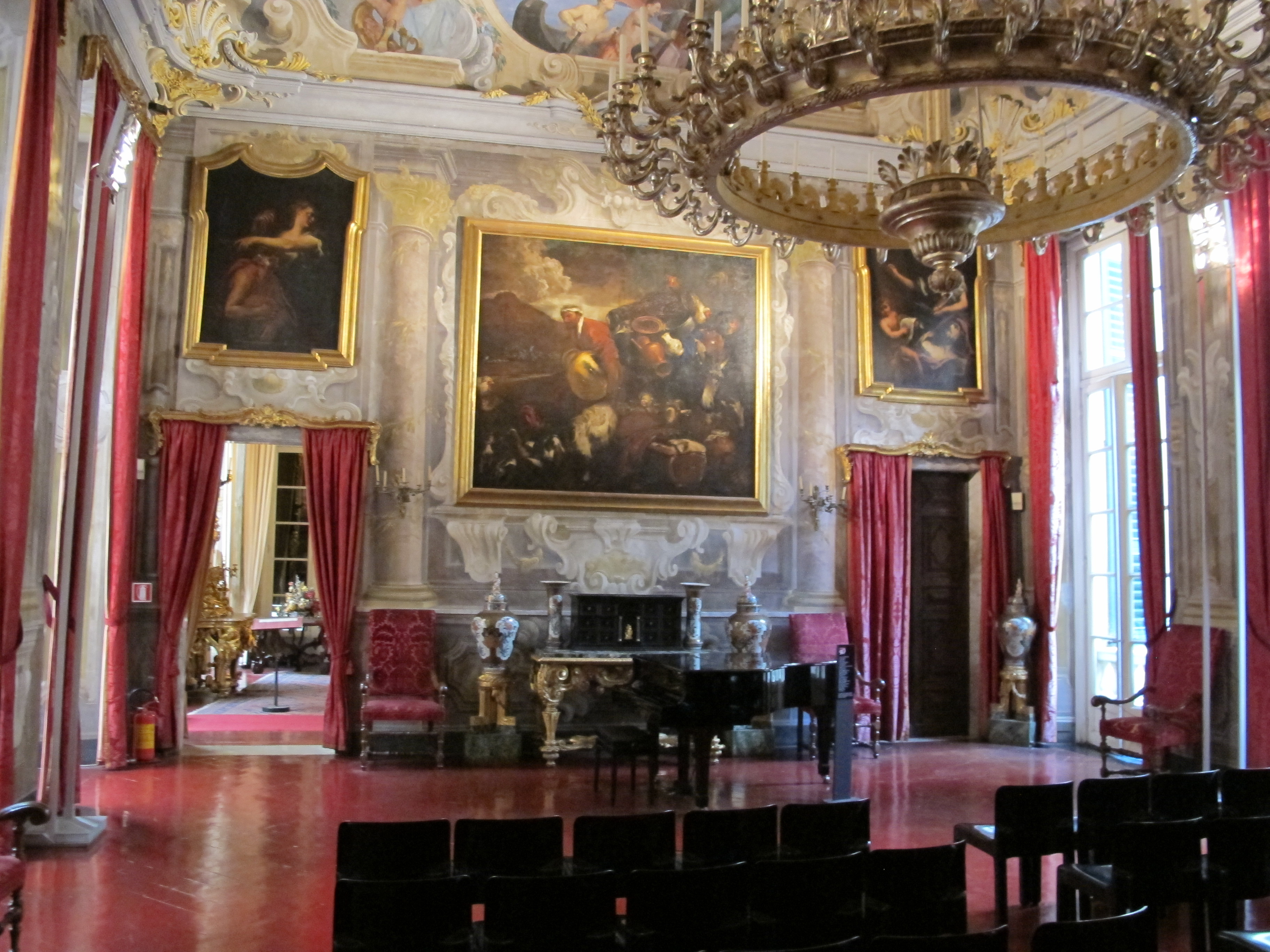
Sitting room

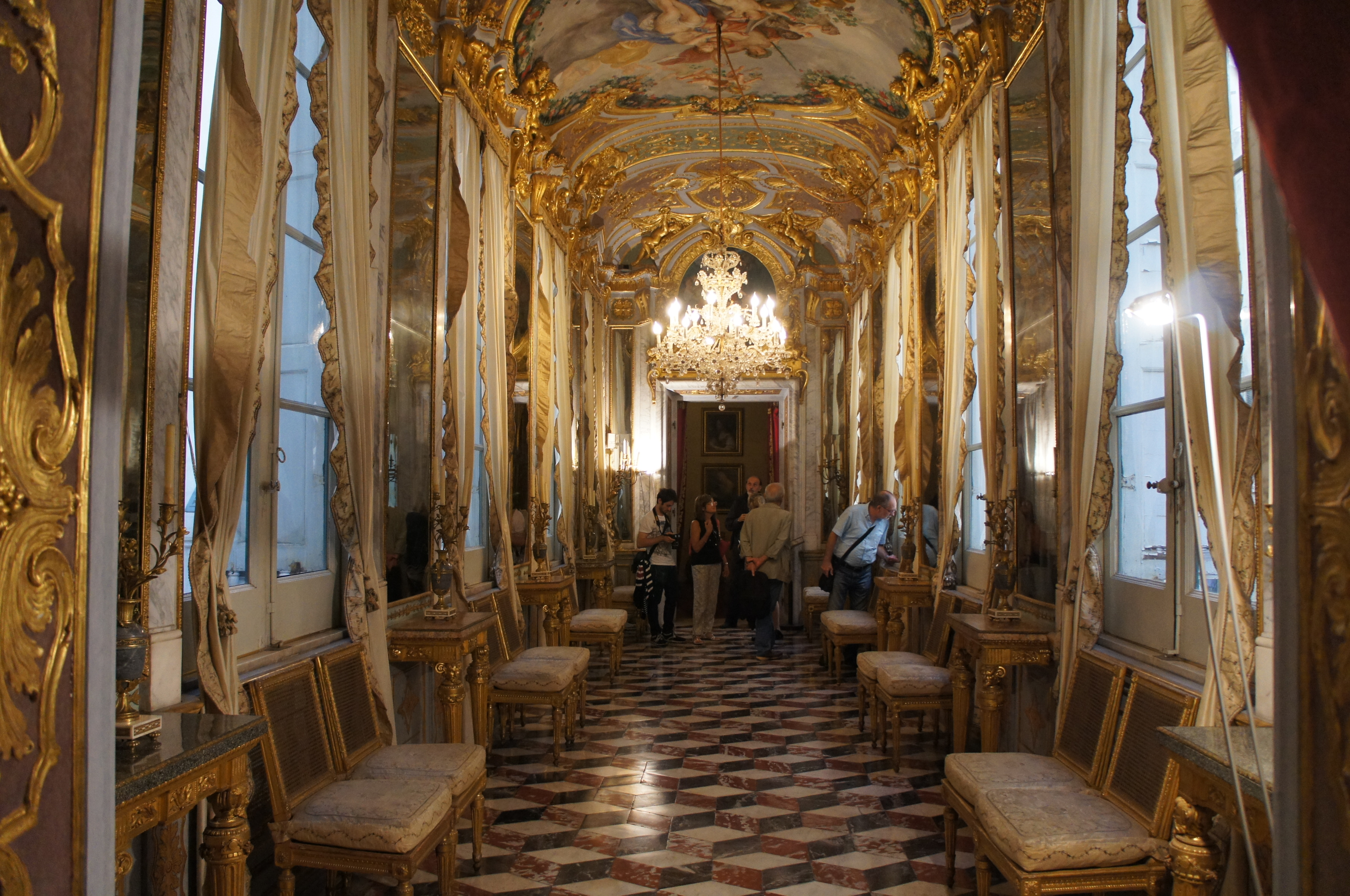
Hall of Mirrors

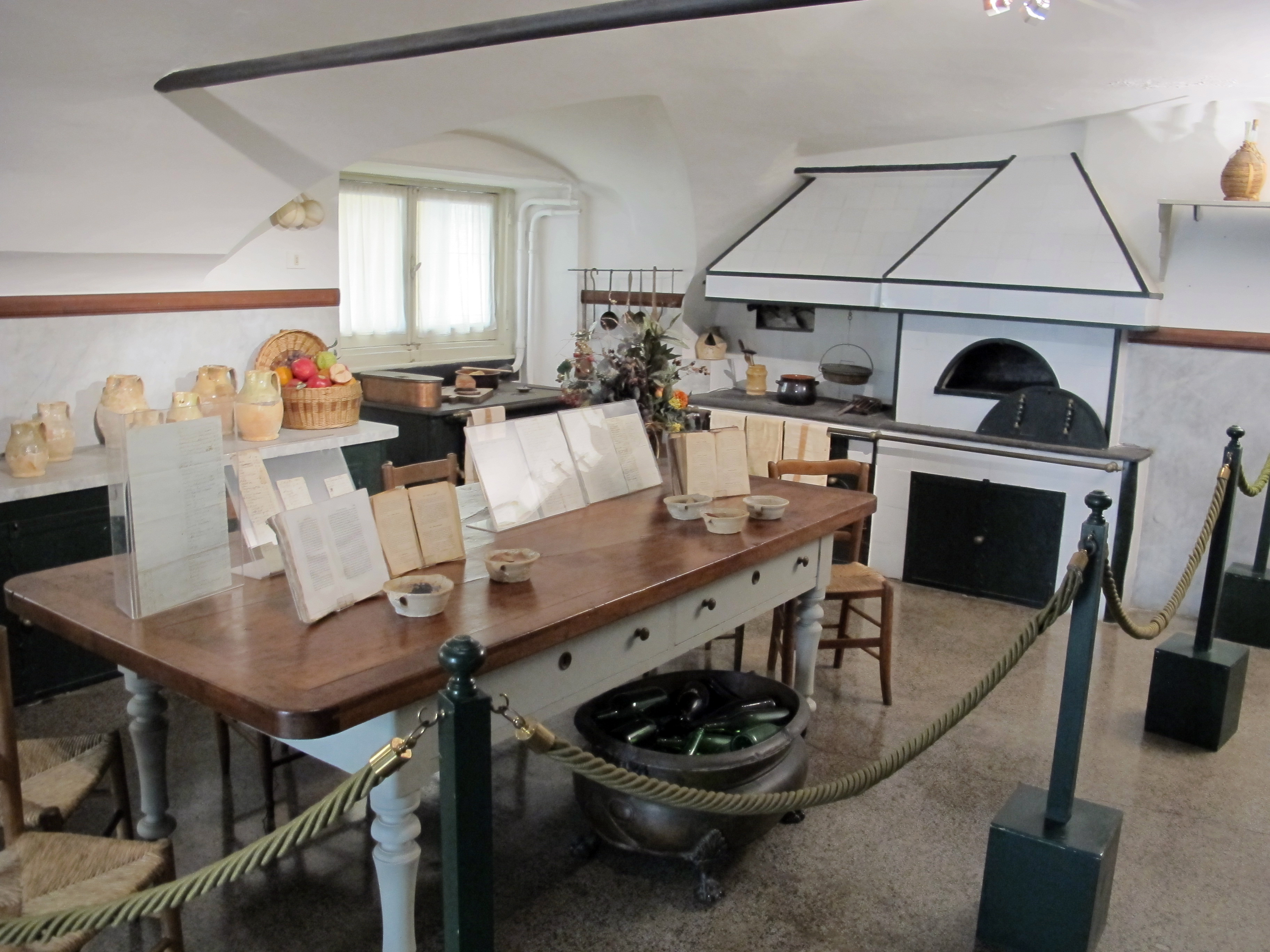
Kitchens
