= Santi Cosma e Damiano, Genoa =

Church building in Genoa, Italy

Coordinates: 44°24′24.01″N 8°55′43.49″E

Santi Cosma e Damiano
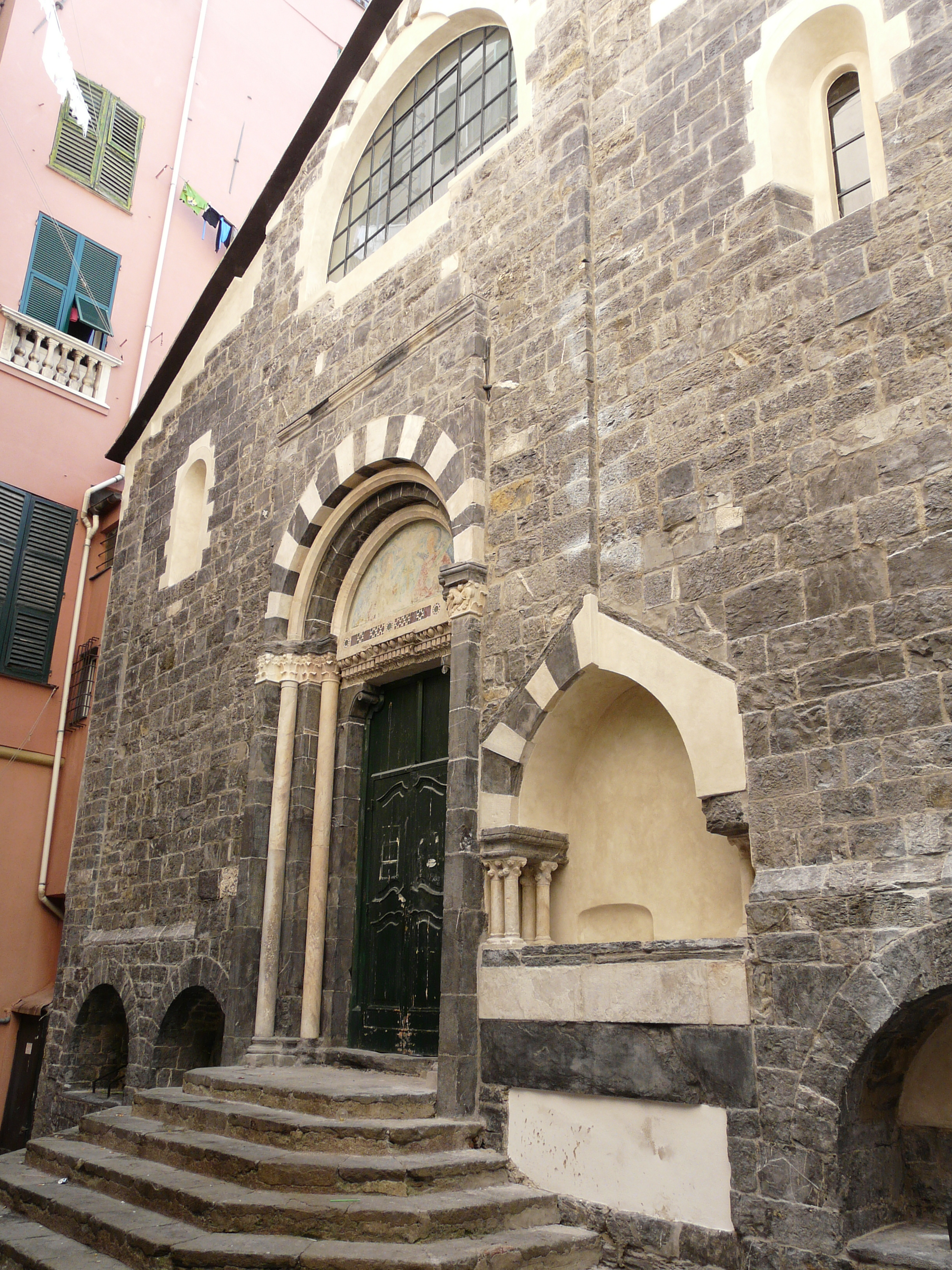

Religion
- Affiliation: Roman Catholic
- Province: Genoa

Location
- Location: Genoa, Italy
- Interactive map of Santi Cosma e Damiano

Architecture
- Type: Church
- Style: Romanesque
- Groundbreaking: 1049
- Completed: 17th Century

The church of Santi Cosma e Damiano is located in central Genoa, Italy. Located at the site of an ancient oratory, it is dedicated to the martyrs Saints Cosmas and Damian. The skull and tibia of the latter are presumably among the relics in the church. They were the patron saints of barbers and doctors. The first documents about the church date to 1049.

In 1684, the church roof was damaged by the naval bombardment of the city. It was also damaged during the bombing of Genoa in World War II. It contains a painting of Esther and Assuerus by Bernardo Castello and a Madonna and child with St Cosma and Damian by Gioacchino Assereto.
