= Santo Stefano (Genoa) =

Church in Genoa

Coordinates: 44.406°N 8.939°E

Church of Saint Stephen (Chiesa di Santo Stefano)
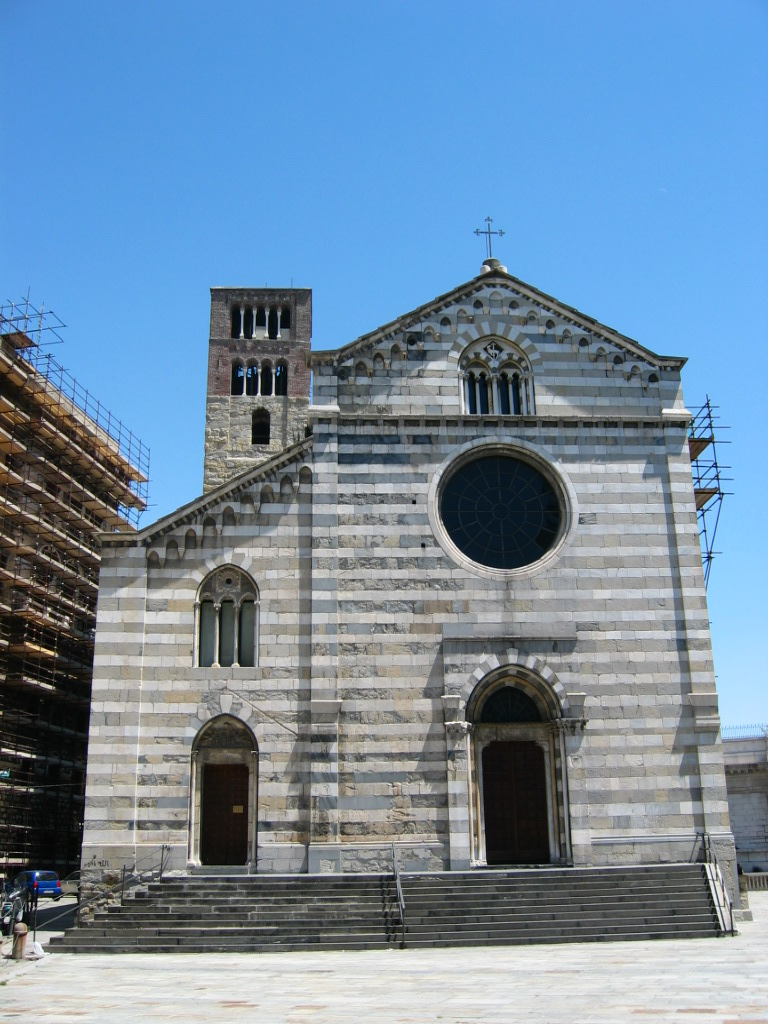
- The façade of the church.

Religion
- Affiliation: Roman Catholic
- Province: Genoa
- Ecclesiastical or organisational status: National monument
- Year consecrated: 972
- Status: Active

Location
- Location: Genoa, Italy
- Interactive map of Church of Saint Stephen (Chiesa di Santo Stefano)

Architecture
- Type: Church
- Style: Romanesque
- Groundbreaking: 10c
- Completed: 17c

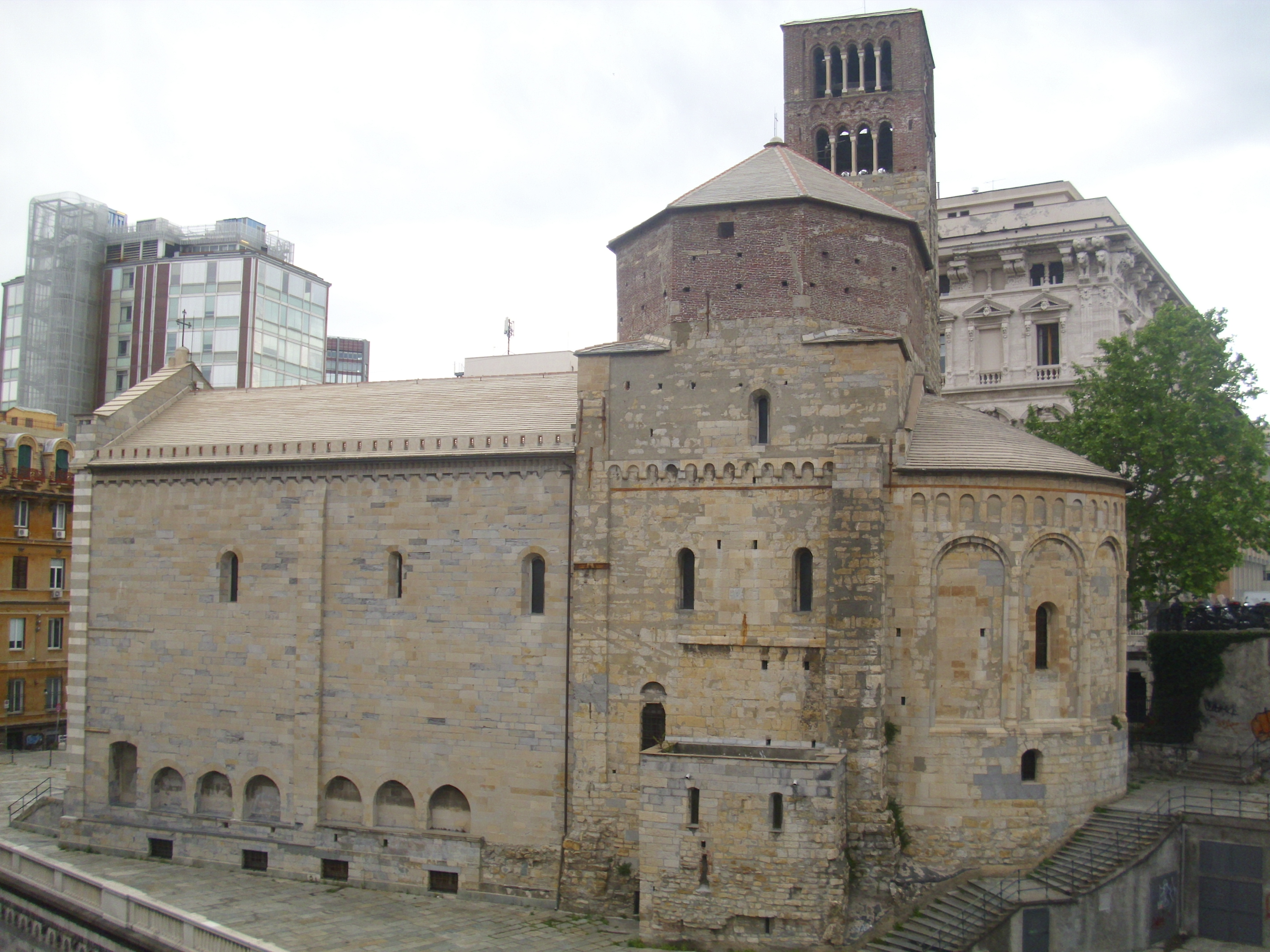
Side view of the church with octagonal dome.

Santo Stefano is a church in Genoa, northern Italy. Located on a hill overlooking the central Via XX Settembre, it is one of the most outstanding examples of Romanesque architecture in the city.

The church had been closed for much of the 20th century, until the restoration of the year 1946-1955, when it was reconsecrated.

== History ==
The church was founded in the Middle Ages as part of an abbey, in the place where previously a 6th-century small church, entitled to St. Michael Archangel, was located. The most ancient document mentioning Santo Stefano dates from 965, although some scholars attribute its foundation in 972 to the then bishop of Genoa, Theodulf, who rebuilt it after a Saracen inroad.

It became a parish only eventually, in an unknown date, anyway after 1054. The abbey was held by the Benedictine order of Columbanian monks of Bobbio from 972 to 1431, when Pope Boniface IX turned it into a commenda under Cardinal Ludovico Fieschi. In 1497 a chapel with a marble choir was added to the church. In 1535 the monastery was demolished, replaced by another in the mid-17th century.

The abbey was cared by the Olivetans from 1529 until 1776.

The parish territory included the houses of Cristopher Columbus who, according to the tradition, would be baptized here.

== Architecture ==
Santo Stefano is on a single nave, with a superelevated presbytery. Under the latter is the crypt, which would be the original nucleus of the church of St Michael Archangel. The dome is now in brickwork; it was rebuilt in the 14th century by abbot Niccolò Fieschi, and is octagonal in shape. The lower section of the bell tower is of uncertain dating, but is commonly deemed to be antecedent to the current church, and that it was probably used as a defensive structure.

The old church was to be replaced by a new Neo-Romanesque style edifice from the 19th century. The latter was however almost destroyed by Allied bombings during World War II.

== Sources ==
- Odicini, G. (1977). Le lapidi recenti collocate nell'abbazia di Santo Stefano.
- Odicini, G. (1972). L'abbazia di Santo Stefano a Genova - Mille anni dalla ricostruzione ad oggi.
- De Simoni, L. (1951). "La chiesa di Santo Stefano dove fu battezzato Colombo". Studi Colombiani.
- Ceschi, C. (1951). "La cripta della chiesa di Santo Stefano". III.
- Storia cronologica dell'Abbazia e Chiesa di Santo Stefano di Genova ricavata da autentiche scritture ed iscrizioni, 1776
