= San Donato, Genoa =

Church in Genoa, Italy

Coordinates: 44°24′21″N 8°55′55″E

Church of Saint Donatus (Chiesa di San Donato)
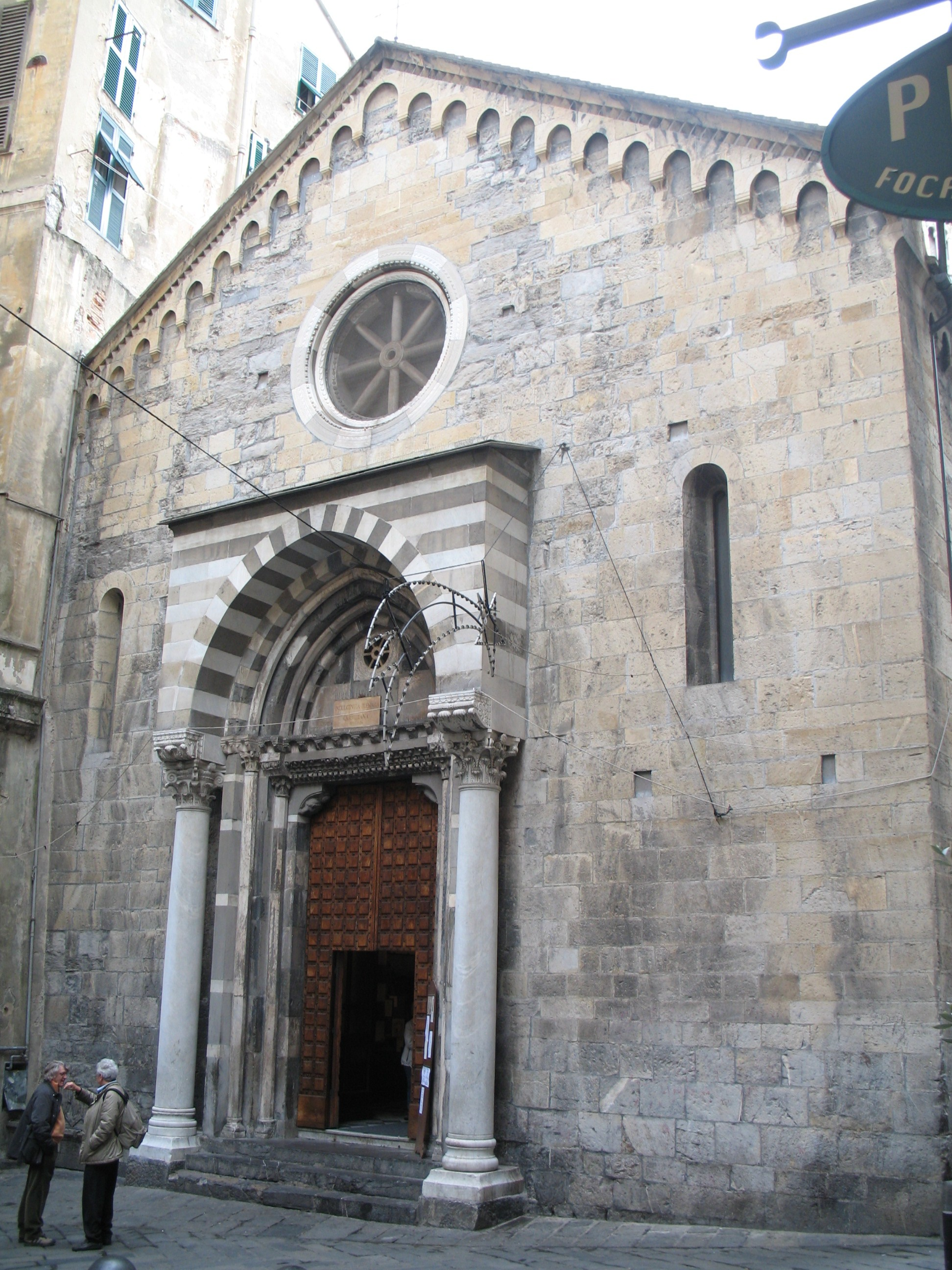
- Façade of the Basilica.

Religion
- Affiliation: Roman Catholic
- Province: Genoa
- Ecclesiastical or organisational status: National monument
- Year consecrated: 1189
- Status: Active

Location
- Location: Genoa, Italy
- Interactive map of Church of Saint Donatus (Chiesa di San Donato)

Architecture
- Type: Church
- Style: Romanesque
- Groundbreaking: 12c

San Donato is a church in Genoa, Northern Italy.

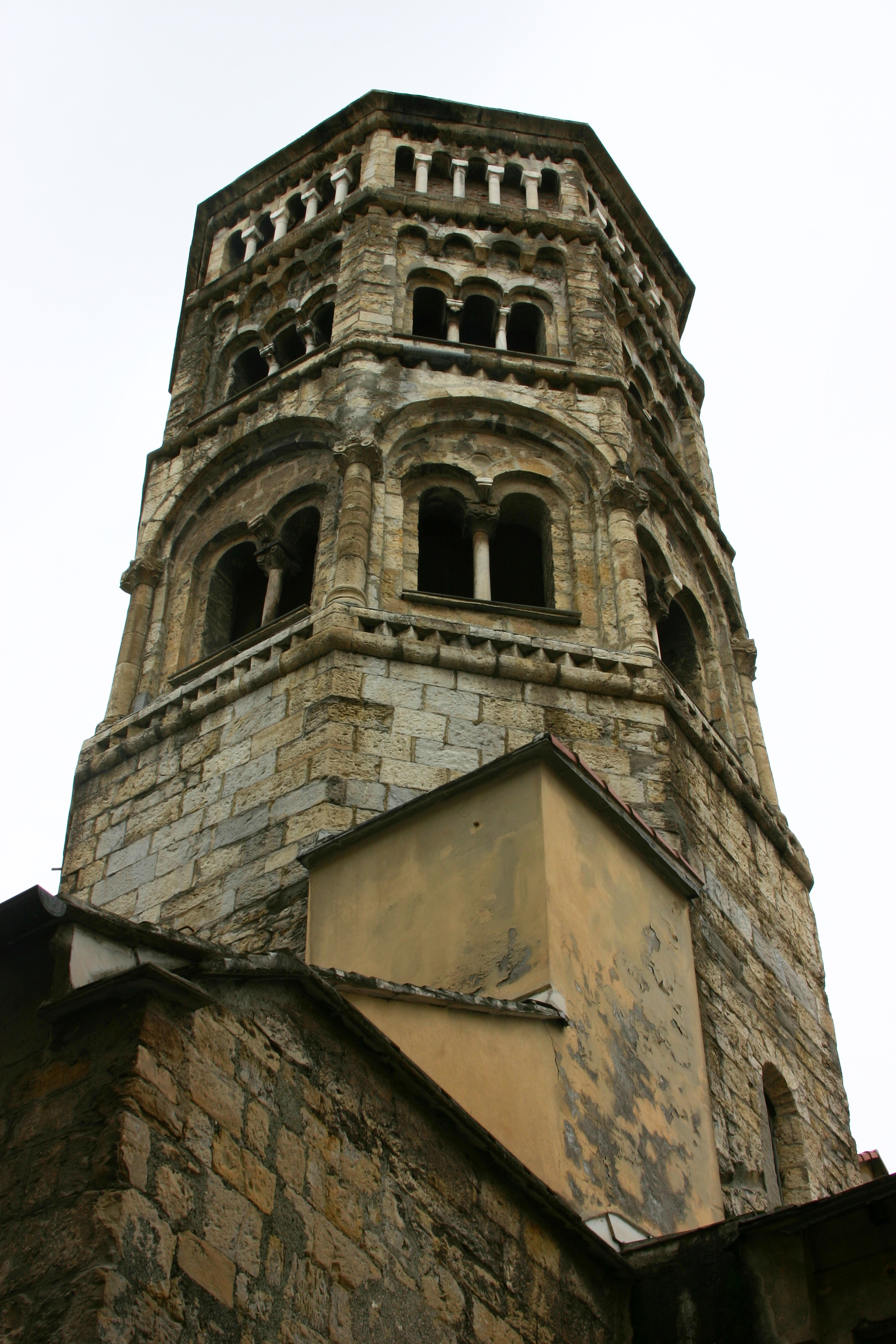
View of the bell tower.

It dates from the 12th century and is in Romanesque style. It became a parish under archbishop Siro il Porcello, and was consecrated on May 1, 1189.

After the bombardment of 1684 it was restored several times, being again consecrated on December 4, 1892. Other restorations in 1946-1951 have kept its Romanesque appearance.

The interior contains a Madonna by the 14th-century painter Nicolò da Voltri; a St Joseph, by Domenico Piola; and a marble relief of the Baptism of Christ, started by Ignazio Peschiera and completed by his pupil Carlo Rubatto. There is also a triptych (1515) by Joos van Cleve representing The Adoration of the Magi; the person who commissioned the work Stefano Raggi with Guardian Saint; and a Mary Magdalen. This is topped by a Crucifixion scene with Mary and St John the Evangelist.
