= Villas of Genoa =

Villas of the city of Genoa, Italy

Coordinates: 44.411111°N 8.932778°E

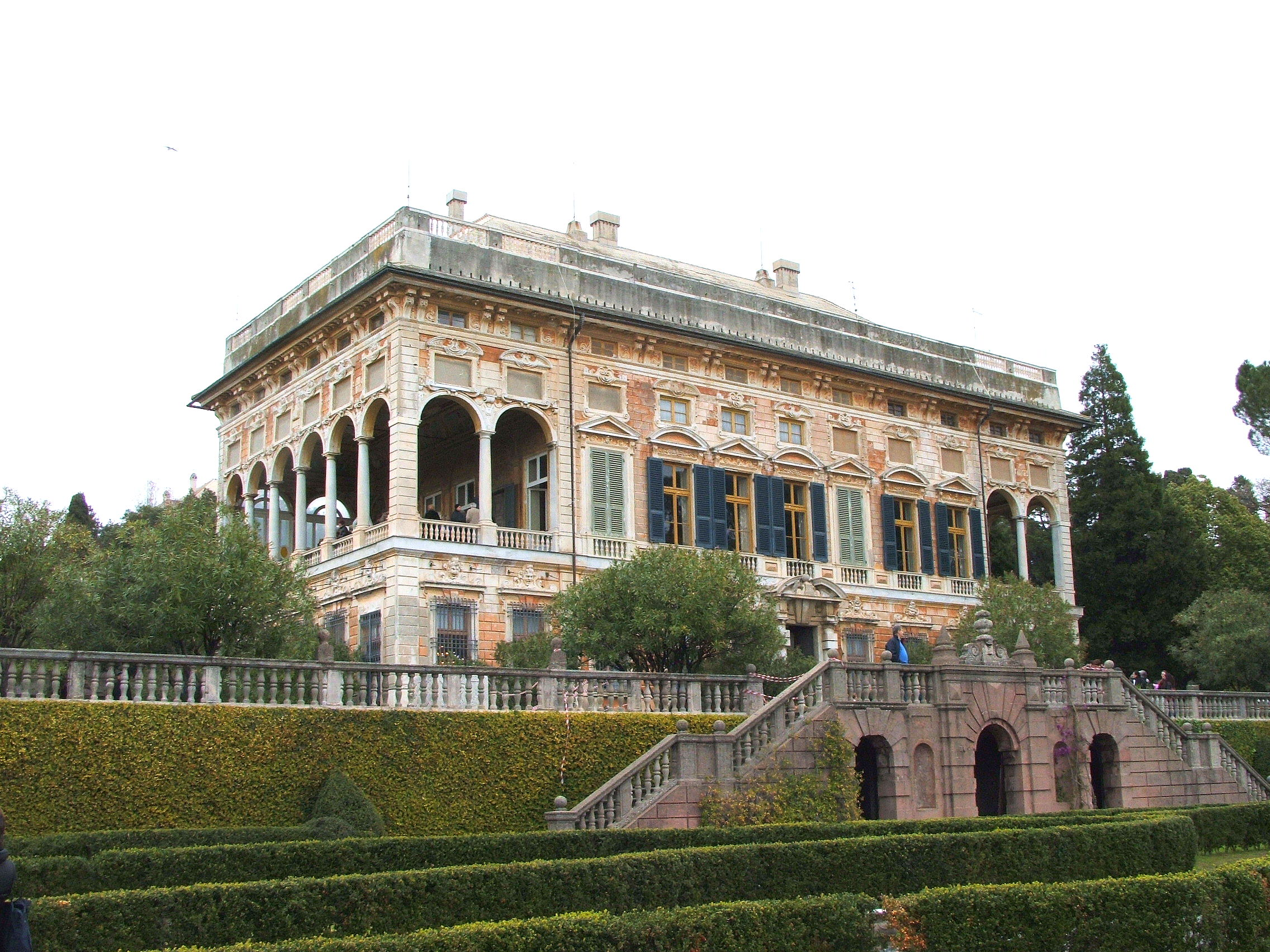
Villa Saluzzo Bombrini, in the Albaro district

Villas have been one of the pillars of the social and economic history of Genoa. Since the 14th century, the villa became the symbol of the power of the aristocratic oligarchy and the wealthy merchant bourgeoisie, for whom it was the mirror of the city palace: outside the walls they conveyed the luxury and magnificence found in the city residences.

In the Great Genoa area alone, there were more than two hundred and sixty villas, a multitude of residences, some of which have been lost, most of which are in ruins or have been used for other purposes, but which, through the few that have been restored and can be visited today, offer a glimpse of the splendor of a ruling class whose entrepreneurial and political skills made them very wealthy.

== History ==
=== Origins ===
The spread of suburban villas, which would characterize the Genoese landscape for centuries, began in the 13th century, when the first dwellings of wealthy citizens, linked to the presence of agricultural land, were built in suburban areas alongside the numerous monastic settlements. The oldest villas had a simple architectural structure and overlooked gardens, vegetable gardens and orchards enclosed by high walls with high porticoes.

Among the oldest (13th century) suburban residences is the one that belonged to Doge Simon Boccanegra on the hill of S. Tecla in San Martino, which has recently been renovated. Located today within the perimeter of the San Martino hospital complex, after years of neglect it was restored in 2005 and is now used as a venue for seminars and conferences.

Due to the difficulties of transportation at the time, summer residences were mainly built in the hilly and coastal areas immediately outside the city walls, particularly those most suitable for the development of agricultural land. This proximity meant that, as early as the 14th century, the city and its suburbs appeared to those arriving in Genoa from the sea as one large area dotted with sumptuous villas and gardens, as witnessed by illustrious travelers, including Petrarch.

=== From the 16th to the 18th century ===
From the 16th century, with the consolidation of wealth in the city among the noble families of feudal origin (such as the Doria, Spinola, Fieschi, Grimaldi and Imperiale) and those of wealthy Genoese merchants and bankers, a new concept of the villa spread, which, from being a center of agricultural production, also became a holiday home and a stately residence. The suburbs of Genoa thus became the prestigious residences of wealthy patrician families, who left their palaces in the city during the summer months to "go to the villa" to spend the warm season.

The trend of vacationing gave rise to a real competition among the aristocratic families to build sumptuous villas that would be admired even by illustrious travelers, calling on the best architects of the time to design them, first and foremost Galeazzo Alessi from Perugia, one of the protagonists of the Genoese cultural renewal in the 16th century. Alessi introduced an innovative architectural model in Genoa: the so-called "Alessian cube", characterized by a compact building with a square base, no courtyard but with a large hall in the center of the piano nobile, pyramidal roofs and high open loggias in the main or rear façade, which defined a new relationship with the outside space, making the villa a dominant element in the landscape.

Villas were built in large numbers mainly on the hill of Albaro and in Sampierdarena, localities close to the city, but also in the nearest riparian centers to the east (from Quarto to Nervi) and west (from Cornigliano to Voltri) and in the valleys of the Polcevera and Bisagno rivers. In particular, Sampierdarena between the sixteenth and seventeenth centuries became one of Italy's best-known holiday resorts.

A number of villas were also built on the outskirts of the city, in areas that were included in the city walls in the 17th century, but had previously been outside the city. An example is the Villa del Principe, built by Perin del Vaga at the beginning of the 16th century for Andrea Doria in Fassolo, just in front of the San Tommaso Gate, a symbol of the prince's supremacy in the political and economic life of Genoa; the park of the villa extended from the hill of Granarolo to the sea.

The construction of villas continued in the following centuries, reaching its peak in the seventeenth century. The patrician families did not spare the resources to build their houses, an immense architectural and historical heritage that still includes more than two hundred suburban villas, almost half of them between Albaro and Nervi.

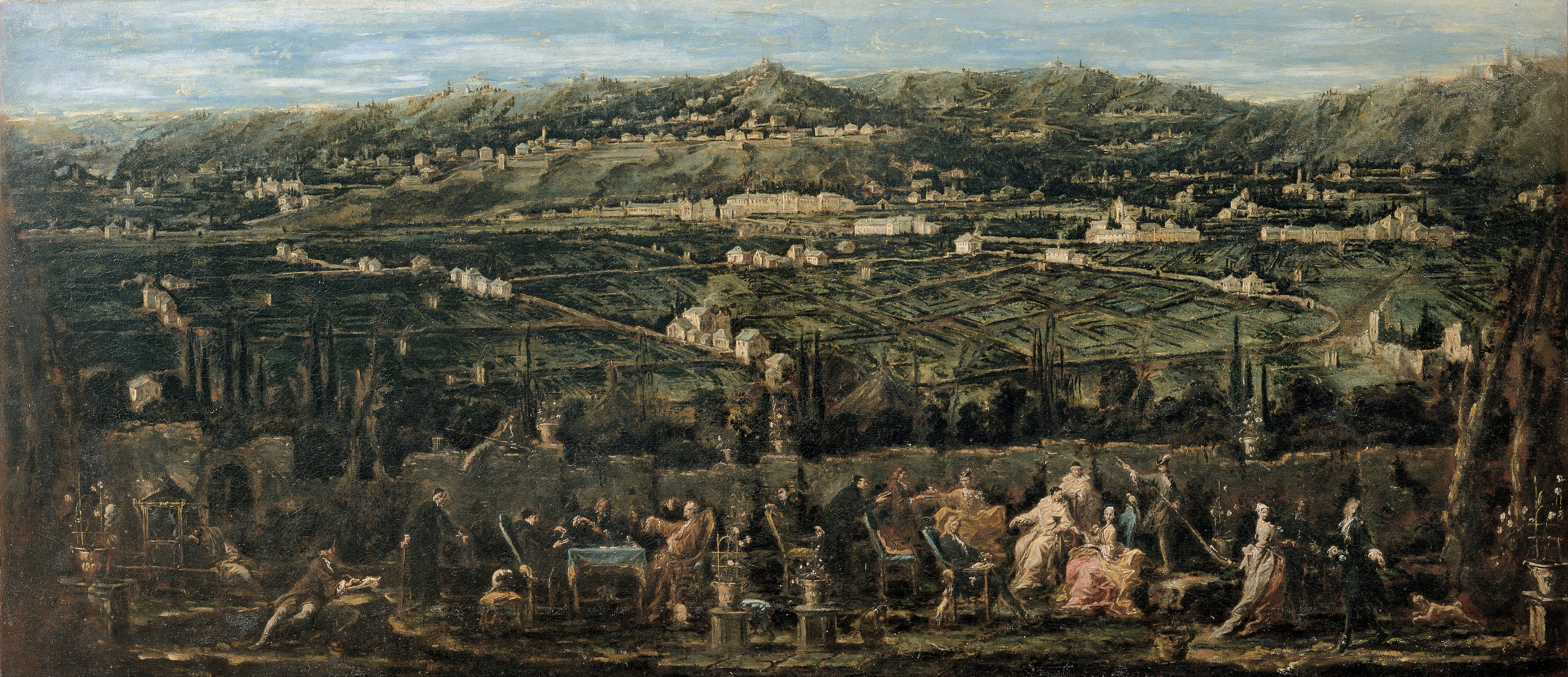
Garden Party in Albaro, by Alessandro Magnasco

Alessandro Magnasco's art has left us a snapshot of the life and environment in which the wealthy society spent its vacations in the first half of the 18th century. In the painting Garden Party in Albaro (1735), preserved in Palazzo Bianco, one can see small groups of people in a garden (identified as that of Villa Saluzzo Bombrini in Albaro), talking, dancing and playing cards, against the backdrop of the Bisagno plain, in the area of San Fruttuoso, which was still cultivated with vegetable gardens. This villa in Albaro, known to the Genoese as Villa Paradiso, was the residence of Fabrizio de André as a young man. Many of his early ballads were written and first sung in a small room on the ground floor that the singer had chosen as his "den".

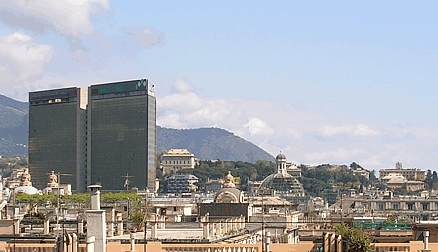
In the midst of modern skyscrapers are ancient villas. Next to the tall towers of the Corte Lambruschini business center is Villa Saluzzo Bombrini. To the right, on the ridge of the Albaro hill, other villas stand out.

At the end of the 18th century, the interest in botany spread among the most educated aristocrats and led many of them to introduce exotic plants from all over the world in their gardens, giving rise to the first botanical gardens. In the Genoa area, the most famous are the one founded by Ippolito Durazzo on the bastion of Santa Caterina (today Villetta Di Negro) and the one founded by Clelia Durazzo Grimaldi in Pegli, today integrated in the park of the Villa Durazzo-Pallavicini, built in the 19th century by Ignazio Pallavicini.

In the same period, many buildings from previous centuries were adapted to the neoclassical and pre-romantic style, mainly by Emanuele Andrea Tagliafichi, a famous landscape architect of the time, who also oversaw the transformation of the parks of many villas to the new trend, such as Villa Lomellini Rostan in Multedo, Villa Rosazza in the San Teodoro district, and Villa Gropallo dello Zerbino (where Ippolito Durazzo moved his botanical garden).

The era of the sumptuous summer residences of the patrician families ended with the arrival of Napoleon in Italy and the end, in 1797, of the Republic of Genoa, which was renamed the Ligurian Republic and effectively came under the control of Republican France, leading to the decline of the aristocratic society immortalized by Magnasco's art.

=== 19th and 20th centuries ===
The wealthy entrepreneurial bourgeoisie, which became the new ruling class in the nineteenth century, had elegant villas built, especially in the eastern part and on the heights of the historic center, but they did not reach the splendor of the patrician villas, although there were exceptions. One of them is the park of Villa Durazzo-Pallavicini in Pegli, designed by Michele Canzio for the Marquis Ignazio Pallavicini. Open to the public from the beginning, it was an extraordinary success among its contemporaries.

Between the end of the 19th century and the beginning of the 20th century, the neo-Gothic buildings are noteworthy, such as the D'Albertis Castle, built by a group of architects under the direction of Alfredo d'Andrade, the Mackenzie Castle and the Bruzzo Castle in the Castelletto area, the Canali Gaslini villa on Corso Italia, and the Turke Castle on the promontory of Santa Chiara, on the border between Albaro and Sturla, all designed by Gino Coppedè in his own personal style inspired by Florentine Gothic.

During the same period, the historic villas, too large for the new needs, were divided into apartments or given to religious communities, in most cases losing their gardens to subdivisions and urban sprawl; the few that remained are now public parks.

In the western part of the city, which experienced a period of intense industrialization between the nineteenth and twentieth centuries, factories were built on the old estates attached to the villas, opposed in vain by the last representatives of the aristocracy associated with them. The villas themselves were often incorporated into the productive fabric as office and storage buildings, and in many cases suffered irreversible degradation.

In the twentieth century, subdivisions, real estate speculation and changes of use led to the disappearance of many historic villas and the complete abandonment of others. However, what remains of this immense architectural heritage allows the visitor, despite the deterioration of the buildings, to perceive the former splendor of those holiday homes that characterized the Genoese landscape for centuries.

== Historic villas ==
This section lists many of the most important historic villas for historical or architectural reasons included in the territory of the Municipality of Genoa. Most of the existing villas are listed as worthy of preservation by the Regional Directorate for Cultural and Environmental Heritage of Liguria.

=== Villas in the historic center ===
The suburban villas in Genoa's historic center were built in the sestieri of San Teodoro and San Vincenzo, which were outside the city walls before the construction of the "New Walls" in the 17th century. In the Castelletto area (formerly part of the sestiere of San Vincenzo), there are also some buildings from the turn of the 19th and 20th centuries.

Villa	Image	Description
Villa del Principe or Palazzo del Principe Andrea Doria a Fassolo		Built by Perin del Vaga for Andrea Doria in the first decades of the sixteenth century, it is located in the San Teodoro district, then just outside the San Tomaso gate of the fourteenth-century city walls. The park uphill was destroyed by the construction of the railroad and the building expansion, but part of the Italian garden in front of the villa remains, characterized by the Fountain of Neptune and divided into four large flowerbeds with Mediterranean and exotic plants (the photo shows a 19th-century view by Alfred Noack).
Villa Di Negro Rosazza, known as "Dello Scoglietto"		It is located in the neighborhood of San Teodoro, uphill from today's Piazza Dinegro. It was built in 1565 for Doge Ambrogio Di Negro or his son Orazio in an area that, at that time, was outside the city walls, in a panoramic position overlooking the sea. It passed to the Durazzo family and was remodeled in neoclassical style in the late 18th century by architect Emanuele Andrea Tagliafichi. Now owned by the City of Genoa, it is connected to a historic park for public use of about 14,000 square meters.
Villa Pallavicino, known as "Delle Peschiere"		Built for Tobia Pallavicino around the middle of the sixteenth century, according to tradition it was designed by Galeazzo Alessi. The villa stands on the hill of Multedo, in the eastern part of the Castelletto district, at the top of a path of terraced gardens, with the fishponds and nymphaeums that gave it its name. The layout of the gardens, which were reduced due to the inauguration of Via Peschiera below, was designed by G.B. Castello, known as "il Bergamasco", who, together with Andrea Semino and Luca Cambiaso, was the author of the interior decoration.
Villa Gropallo dello Zerbino		It was built for the Balbi family in the second half of the 16th century in the classical Alessian style. It passed to the Durazzo family in the 18th century and finally to the Gropallo family; it contains precious 17th century frescoes by Gregorio De Ferrari ("Time" and "Seasons") and Domenico Piola. In the eighteenth century, Ippolito Durazzo entrusted the design of the park to Emanuele Andrea Tagliafichi, who personally supervised the planting of many exotic species (in the picture, the villa, photographed by Paolo Monti in 1963).
Villa Grimaldi Sauli		Located in the San Vincenzo district, near the Brignole train station, it was built in the mid-sixteenth century by Galeazzo Alessi for a branch of the Grimaldi family. At the time of its construction, it was considered by Gauthier to be one of the most beautiful villas in Genoa, and Vasari lavishly described its spacious baths, rich in ornaments and waterworks. It contained frescoes by Luca Cambiaso, later removed and preserved in the gallery of Palazzo Bianco, and by Orazio Semino. From the eighteenth century, the villa experienced a gradual period of decline that finally saw it undergo a radical transformation in the late nineteenth century, transforming it from a Renaissance villa to a nineteenth-century Genoese style villa.
Villa Croce (Carignano)		Located in the district of Carignano, it is surrounded by a large park overlooking the seaside promenade; it was built in the 19th century by transforming an earlier 17th century Spinola building and houses the Villa Croce Museum of Contemporary Art.
Villetta Di Negro		It was built at the beginning of the 19th century by the Marquis Giancarlo Di Negro on the ruins of the Santa Caterina bastion of the 14th-15th century walls. Destroyed by bombs during the Second World War, it was replaced by the Edoardo Chiossone Museum of Oriental Art. Its large park is now one of the green lungs of the historic center.
Villa Gruber De Mari		Located in the Castelletto district, it has a large park overlooking the ring road uphill; the villa, a neoclassical renovation of the 16th-century Palazzo De Mari, incorporates the tower of the original building; the park, laid out in the English style with groves and clearings, is now a public garden.
Villa Croce (Castelletto)		Located in the Castelletto district, it was built in the 18th century as a suburban villa, with an L-shaped plan and two corner loggias on the elevations, with frescoes and original architectural divisions. A baroque complex with a nymphaeum and staircases connects it to the garden. The park borders on the park of Villa Gruber de Mari uphill and was much larger before the sectioning of the Circonvallazione a Monte (upper ring road). It is still a private residence.
Villa Madre Cabrini, formerly Villa Acquarone		It is located in the Castelletto district, near the 16th century convent of Sant'Anna. The original 18th-century nucleus, modified and rebuilt over time, took on its present appearance in the early 20th century with the rebuilding of the facades in eclectic style. Formerly known as Villa Acquarone or Palazzo Acquarone, the villa passed to the Missionary Sisters of the Sacred Heart of Jesus of St. Frances Xavier Cabrini, who renamed it Villa Madre Cabrini and established a boarding school there. In the 1980s it was restored and converted to residential use.
D'Albertis Castle		One of the most notable modern villas with a panoramic park, it was built in the neo-Gothic style at the end of the 19th century by a group of architects under the supervision of Alfredo d'Andrade for the explorer Enrico Alberto d'Albertis on the ruins of the Montegalletto bastion of the 14th-15th century walls. It houses the Museum of World Cultures.
Mackenzie Castle		Located in the Castelletto neighborhood, it was built by Gino Coppedè between 1893 and 1905 for Evan Mackenzie, a wealthy Florentine insurer. Today it is home to an auction house.
Bruzzo Castle		Located in the Castelletto district, it is also the work of Coppedè; it was built in 1904 for Pietro Micheli.

=== Villas of the eastern part of the city ===
This is the part of the city that has undergone fewer transformations of a productive nature and where numerous and better-preserved ancient patrician residences remain, even with their parks and gardens, although they have been downsized by the strong residential expansion.

==== Albaro ====
Numerous historic villas can still be found in the Albaro district, which was one of the favorite areas of the Genoese aristocrats; many of them, renovated, are partly subdivided into apartments, while others house educational institutions and university campuses, clinics and nursing homes.

Villa	Image	Description
Villa Giustiniani-Cambiaso		It stands in a dominant position at the top of the Cambiaso valley, now a public park representing what remains of the villa's park that originally extended to the sea. It was built in 1548 by Galeazzo Alessi for Luca Giustiniani. The property passed to the Cambiaso family in 1787 and to the municipality of Genoa in 1921; today it belongs to the Carige Foundation and is home to the engineering faculty of the University of Genoa. The structure elaborated by the Perugian architect for this villa, with its cubic shape divided by pilasters, became the model for the construction of other villas and palaces in the Genoa area.
Villa Saluzzo Bombrini		Villa Saluzzo Bombrini, called the Paradise, a typical example of late Mannerist architecture, stands in a dominant position on the hill of Albaro. It was built for Giacomo Saluzzo by Andrea Ceresola, known as Vannone, in the last decade of the 16th century; in 1837 it became the property of Marquis Henri de Podenas; in 1886 it was sold by the heirs of the French nobleman to the Bombrini family, in whose hands it remained until 2005 when it was acquired by a real estate company. In 2007 it was finally sold to private individuals to be used for housing and offices.
Villa Saluzzo Mongiardino		Opposite the entrance to Villa Saluzzo Bombrini stands Villa Saluzzo Mongiardino, also built for the Saluzzo family in the early 18th century, which became the property of the Brians in 1871. The name Mongiardino comes from the tenants who occupied it from the 1930s to the 1970s. Although still privately owned and divided into apartments, and therefore not open to visitors, more than for its architectural features and the lavish Baroque decoration of the interior, it is known for George Byron's stay there between 1822 and 1823, before embarking to take part in the Greek War of Independence, where he is said to have died in April 1824 from a serious illness, as recalled by an epigraph on the facade.
Villa Brignole Sale		Located on Via S. Nazaro, one of the typical crêuze of Albaro, it was built by an architect of the school of Bartolomeo Bianco for Marquis Giulio Sale in the early seventeenth century by remaking a sixteenth-century building. The villa passed to his daughter Geronima and son-in-law Giovanni Francesco Brignole, who made numerous changes. The latter, together with his son Anton Giulio hosted distinguished men of culture of his time in the villa, among them the Savona poet Gabriello Chiabrera. In 1882 it was sold to the Marcelline nuns and turned into a girls' boarding school and is still a private school today. Some parts of the building were destroyed by bombing in 1942 and rebuilt after the war respecting the original structure as much as possible. (In the picture the villa as photographed by Paolo Monti in 1963).
Villa Bagnarello		Also on Via San Nazaro is Villa Bagnarello, best known for the stay in Genoa of Charles Dickens, who lived there from July to September 1844 with his family, later moving to Villa Pallavicini "delle Peschiere". A plaque commemorates his brief stay in Albaro. At first glance, as he himself wrote, the writer did not have a positive impression of this mansion, which he called a "pink jail." Later, his stay there, with the magnificent view of the sea and the pleasant sea breeze, made him reconsider to the point of regret upon his departure.
Villa Allgeyer-Fuckel		Built in the late 17th century, it belonged to Doge Gerolamo Veneroso. In 1901 it was bought by the Fuckel family, who had it renovated by architect Riccardo Haupt, who added a new marble staircase and a tower. Requisitioned during World War I, as the Fuckels were German citizens, it was returned to them after World War I. In 1939 Anna Allgeyer, the Fuckel's widow, sold it to the Marist Brothers.
Villa Sauli Bombrini Doria		Known as Villa Bombrini, it is the home of the Niccolò Paganini Conservatory. It is surrounded by an English garden extending for about one hectare.
Villa Raggio		Originally a 16th-century villa but renovated by Riccardo Haupt between 1898 and 1900, the temporary home of the Paganini Conservatory during the years of World War II, it has been converted into private housing after having been a private hospital institution for many years.
Villa Rebuffo Gattorno		A 17th-century villa with a large garden in front, it houses a university residence.
Villa Soprani		It stands in the easternmost part of the Albaro district; it was built in the early 17th century and preserves a cycle of frescoes by Giovanni Carlone with scenes from Ovid's Metamorphoses.
Villa Canali Gaslini		The best known of the twentieth-century villas in Albaro was one of the last works in Genoa by Gino Coppedè; built between 1924 and 1925 for the Canali family it later became the seat of the consulate of Japan and during the war period was occupied first by German and then by Allied troops. It was purchased in 1942 by Gerolamo Gaslini (an oil industrialist and founder of the pediatric institute named after his daughter Giannina) who lived there from 1948. Since 1988 it has been home to the Gaslini Foundation. The villa, surrounded by a scenic garden, stands on a hillock overlooking Corso Italia, at San Giuliano beach.
Villa Chiossone		The villa, located directly on the seafront of Corso Italia was built in 1925 by Gino Coppedè in Art Nouveau style with Spanish and eclectic influences. The building is made of stone masonry and brick with exposed face, with a clay roof. It features a quadrangular central structure with a scenic staircase and a tower overlooking the gulf. It was initially a noble residence, then a hotel, and later the headquarters of the David Chiossone Institute for the Blind and a hall for events and weddings.

==== Quarto dei Mille ====
Villa	Image	Description
Villa Quartara		In the Quarto district an early villa had been built in the late 14th century, but it was rebuilt around the middle of the 15th century by the Castagna family. It had several owners over the centuries, including the Doria and Spinola families, and underwent various transformations over time, the most important by the Spinola family in the 18th century. Its park stretches from the Via Antica Romana to the sea. In 1815 it housed Pope Pius VII fleeing Rome during the Hundred Days of Napoleon, when Joachim Murat had attacked the Papal States. In 1889 it was bought by Lorenzo Quartara, mayor of the then municipality of Quarto, who in 1902 had it enlarged with a large wing, decorated with frescoes by Luigi Morgari, and modified the park with a scenic geometric design. After September 8, 1943 it was requisitioned and used as the headquarters of the German military command, and on this occasion the park was disfigured with the construction of some military installations. In 1960, the villa was donated to the Benedictines who officiated at the nearby parish of Santa Maria della Castagna, who arranged their library there and finally passed to the “Gaslini Foundation,” the current owner, which made it the home of CISEF Gaslini.
Villa Carrara		Within a large park are a number of villas that belonged to the Spinola family and later to the Carrara family; these include Villa Spinola Carrara, built in the 17th century on land belonging to the Spinola family, and a neo-Gothic style villa overlooking the sea, built in the early 20th century.
Villa Spinola Cosci		It was built in the 17th century; in 1860 patriot Candido Augusto Vecchi hosted Giuseppe Garibaldi there in the days leading up to the embarkation of the Expedition of the Thousand. The villa houses the Garibaldi Museum of Quarto.
Villa Spinola Doria D'Albertis		Located in the center of a large agricultural estate, it was built for the Spinola family of San Luca, but the year of its construction is unknown. When it became the property of the Doria family in 1593, it was transformed into a luxurious residential residence. Modifications occurred in the 19th and early 20th centuries.
Villa Coppedè		A neo-Gothic style villa with a turret, it was designed by architect Gino Coppedè, who lived there during his stay in Genoa. It is located on Rossetti Street in the Priaruggia area.

==== Nervi ====
Nervi, the easternmost district of Great Genoa, is characterized by the largest complex of urban parks in the municipal area, derived from the transformation of the gardens of historic patrician villas into landscape parks. The parks of Nervi, located upstream from the waterfront promenade and the railway line, extend for about 9 hectares and are formed by the union of the parks of the Saluzzo-Serra, Gropallo and Grimaldi-Fassio villas, acquired by the municipality of Genoa between 1927 and 1979. The parks constitute a significant example of a late 18th-century garden, in which tall trees are found along with typical Mediterranean shrubs and exotic plants.

Villa	Image	Description
Villa Gropallo		Surrounded by the vast park along with which it was ceded to the municipality of Genoa, it was built by Francesco Gropallo in the eighteenth century; it is now home to the Nervi Civic Library. Its park was renovated by Marquis Gaetano Gropallo in the early nineteenth century, replacing the Mediterranean species with cedars of Lebanon, palms and other plants considered exotic for the time. In 1918 his heirs sold the property to a real estate company, and in 1927 it was purchased by the municipality of Genoa.
Villa Saluzzo Serra		The villa, built in the 17th century and now home to the Gallery of Modern Art, opens onto a vast park. It too was purchased in 1927 by the municipality of Genoa to make it the home of the Ligurian capital's Gallery of Modern Art, which opened on December 16, 1928. Closed between 1989 and 2004, the gallery reopened to the public in 2004 after a radical restoration and rearrangement of the collections ranging from the late 18th century to the entire 20th century. Ownership of the villa passed over time to different owners, and the building with the passage of centuries underwent several expansions from the original design. The last owner, shipowner Carlo Barabino, sold it in 1926 to the municipality of Genoa, which two years later made it the home of the modern art gallery (which now also houses works from the Wolfson collection).
Villa Grimaldi Fassio		The date of its construction is not known precisely, but it is dated by various authors to the 16th century. Next to the villa is a deconsecrated chapel dating from the second half of the 18th century. Passing through various owners in the 20th century, in 1956 it was purchased by the shipowners Fassio Tomellini, who made significant changes to the structure of the building, including the creation of a new hall with access to the park. In 1979 the municipality of Genoa purchased the villa and surrounding park from the latter owners. The villa now houses the museum of the Frugone brothers' collections, opened in 1993, with works by Italian and foreign artists of the 19th and early 20th centuries. The English-style park expands toward the sea, beyond the railway, and includes the rose garden, which in the past had about 800 different varieties of roses.
Villa Luxoro		A villa with park in the Capolungo area, it is the most recent of Nervi's villas, built in 1903 at the eastern end of the neighborhood, and since 1951 has been home to the Giannettino Luxoro Museum, with the owners' rich collections of paintings and antiques as well as subsequent acquisitions. The park, with Mediterranean species (there are pines, palms, carobs, cypresses), faces the cliff overlooking the sea.
Villa Gnecco		It stands by the Nervi River, just above the stretch crossed by Nervi's historic bridge. Built in the 18th century, it has the characteristic structure of reinforced corners, in the manner of fortifications, enclosing the three-arched loggia in the center.
Villa Cattaneo della Volta		Villa Cattaneo della Volta, formerly Fravega, stands halfway up the hillside along the Sant'Ilario hill front. It was originally a manor house at the center of an agricultural estate that stretched from the Via Aurelia to the hillside with gardens, citrus groves, olive groves and horticultural crops.
Villa Penco		Also located in the intermediate hillside, along the hillside roads, like Villa Cattaneo della Volta it was of agricultural origin.

=== Villas of Sampierdarena ===
Sampierdarena was, like Albaro, one of the favorite holiday resorts of the aristocrats, but with the advent of industry and the consequent urbanization, the parks that stretched from the sea to the hills of Belvedere and Promontorio totally disappeared, with the exception of part of that of Villa Imperiale Scassi, which became a public garden, and the villas themselves were destined for other uses, such as offices or warehouses, when they were not demolished to make way for factories and housing.

Particularly significant is the group of three 16th-century villas known as the "Alessian triad," because they were built according to the architectural principles introduced in Genoa by Galeazzo Alessi and long believed to be the work of the Perugian architect; only research conducted by scholars in the 20th century has allowed their attribution to his collaborators and followers active in Genoa at that time. The three villas, built for the powerful Genoese families Imperiale, Grimaldi, and Lercari, are known by the names "Beauty," "Fortress," and "Simplicity," respectively.

Villa	Image	Description
Villa Imperiale Scassi		Today a school, it was built in the mid-sixteenth century by brothers Domenico and Giovanni Ponzello for the Imperiale family. Because of its sumptuousness, it was called “the Beauty”; important artists of the time contributed to the decoration, such as Giovanni Carlone, Bernardo Castello. In the early 19th century it was bought by physician Onofrio Scassi, who had it restored by Carlo Barabino and embellished with neoclassical decorations. In 1886 it was purchased by the municipality of Sampierdarena, and in 1926, with the establishment of Great Genoa, it became part of the property of the municipality of Genoa; it has been used as a school ever since. In addition to the palace, the villa was famous for its very large park, much of which was sacrificed in the early decades of the twentieth century for the construction, in the upstream part, of the Villa Scassi hospital and, immediately behind the palace, of the Sampierdarenese stadium, which was short-lived, however, and was itself demolished in 1929 for the opening of Via Cantore. What remains today is a public garden, the largest in the urban area of Sampierdarena.
Villa Grimaldi		It was built by Lombard Bernardo Spazio for the banker Giovanni Battista Grimaldi. Called "the Fortress" because of its massive and austere structure, devoid of external decorations, it remained the property of the Grimaldi family until the nineteenth century, when it was purchased by Agostino Scassi and leased for different uses, until it became a canning factory. Purchased in 1924 by the municipality of Sampierdarena since 1926 it became part of the property of the municipality of Genoa and was used as a school until 2006. Since then it has been closed and unused. The villa is among the Genoese mansions whose designs were collected by Rubens, who stayed there in 1607, in the illustrated volume “Palaces of Genoa,” published in Antwerp in 1622.
Villa Lercari Sauli		Called "the Simplicity" for its simple shapes, it was built by Bernardino Cantone, in collaboration with Bernardo Spazio, for Giovanni Battista Lercari. Purchased by the Sauli family at the end of the 18th century, a century later, at the height of the industrialization of the Sampierdarenese territory, it became the property of the entrepreneur Silvestro Nasturzio, who built a factory on the garden's land. Severely damaged during World War II by aerial bombing, it was sold to private owners after the war and subdivided into apartments. Only the exterior structure is preserved of the original building, suffocated by the presence of buildings constructed in the last century, including the "Civic Center," which was built in the 1980s on the site of the former Nasturzio factory.
Villa Spinola di San Pietro		The villa, whose architect is unknown, was also commissioned by Giovanni Battista Lercari in the second half of the 16th century. His nephew Giovanni Battista Spinola, duke of San Pietro in Galatina, had it renovated, completing the interior decoration. With the work carried out between 1622 and 1625, the building underwent substantial changes, with the closing of the loggias and the opening of new windows. It is one of two Sampierdarenese palaces described by Rubens in the volume Palaces of Genoa, where it is identified as palace "C." Until the 19th century it remained the property of the Spinola family, and was then given to various religious institutes and finally in 1920 to the municipality of Sampierdarena, which used it as a school. Once in an open and dominant position, since the early twentieth century it has been surrounded and obstructed by buildings constructed around it. It is currently home to the Piero Gobetti state high school. Inside are frescoes by Bernardo Castello, Giovanni Carlone, and Giovanni Andrea Ansaldo. (Pictured is the Villa Spinola di San Pietro in an illustration by Rubens).
Villa Centurione del Monastero		It is so called because it was built in 1587 for Barnaba Centurione on the site of a 13th-century monastery of Benedictine nuns, of which it preserves the cloister in the inner courtyard. The atrium and hall on the second floor are decorated with frescoes by Bernardo Castello. The building underwent remodeling in the early 20th century, when it was purchased by the municipality of Sampierdarena and converted into a school.
Villa Centurione Carpaneto		It is located in Piazza Montano, opposite the train station. It dates from the 16th century but has been much remodeled, and its main floor contains frescoes by Bernardo Strozzi, the only ones by this painter, best known for his oil paintings. The palace incorporates a tower at the rear, perhaps pre-existing; what remained of its vast garden disappeared with the opening of Via Cantore.
Villa Crosa Diana		Erected in the 16th century by the Crosa family, which had made its fortune through trade, it remained their property until the Napoleonic era when the Crosa family went through its first economic difficulties. In 1900 the increasingly weakened Crosa family sold the villa to the Dianas, eminent Sampierdarena exponents and owners of a canning industry, who appropriated the building. Long abandoned after the sale to the Dianas, the villa remained abandoned, although under protection, until 2002 when it underwent a major restoration that divided it into apartments for private individuals.
Villa Tommaso Spinola		Via Rolando, 56 R. It is referred to generically as a 16th-century building, and in the 1757 Vinzonian map it is described as belonging to the estate of Tomaso Spinola, endowed with an Italianate garden and extensive grounds that stretched westward. The current façade has few features that recall the building's history, and the building has been obstructed by gradual additions. The complex, which no longer has a garden, is embedded in a continuum of houses that flank it on both sides. In the 2000s, a restoration of the building completely designated it for civilian residential use.
Villa Currò		Via dei Landi, 19. Also known as Villa Pallavicino Durazzo Currò, it is a sixteenth-century building built in a rather steep area, but with a wide panorama of the western Riviera; it has the appearance of the traditional pre-Alessian villa: elongated and rectangular, without any decoration; it has a lateral body added to the east, forming a terrace for the main floor. The adjoining chapel, mentioned in some documents of the 16th century, was lost during the remodeling. In the eighteenth century the villa and the land are mentioned as belonging to Giovanni Luca Pallavicini, and by inheritance they passed to the Durazzo-Pallavicini family, who in 1867 sold it to the Currò family, who kept it until 1900, when it was transformed into a school for orphans. Today it still houses a kindergarten. The building remains unchanged and is protected by the Superintendency, but little remains of the park, which was incorporated into the wild urbanization of the early 20th century.
Villa Doria delle Franzoniane		Built in the 16th century for the Doria family, in 1764 it was purchased by Abbot Paolo Gerolamo Franzoni to make it the seat of the congregation of Pious Mothers, which he had founded a few years earlier. It preserves inside frescoes from the school of the Calvi brothers and in the refectory a painting by Bernardo Castello; attached to the villa, characterized by a perfectly preserved tower, is the small church of Nostra Signora della Sapienza, built in 1821 to a design by Angelo Scaniglia. In the garden, much downsized after the opening of Via Cantore, there is still a large grotto nymphaeum.
Villa Negrone Moro		Located at the eastern end of the neighborhood, it probably dates back to the 16th century and shows typical features of the Alessian style villas, but the precise date of its construction and the architect are unknown. It was connected to the west with the Pallavicini Moro villa, which by then was in an advanced state of decay and was demolished in 1972, and of which only the lower part of the facade with the large entrance portal remains. Formerly owned by the Negrone family, at the end of the 19th century it was incorporated into the perimeter of the Moro oil mill, which had been established on the land behind. In the 1970s with the demolition of the factory, the villa was renovated for office use and the surrounding area made public.
Villa Pallavicini Gardino		In Alessian style, it was built around the end of the 16th century and belonged to the Pallavicini family, which had a large group of family villas in this area, almost all of which have disappeared. In 1946 it was bought by the Gardino family, who had already occupied it since 1920 and had built a lumber yard on the land uphill, which was moved elsewhere in 2002 when the land was sold to build the San Benigno business center. The villa underwent a conservative restoration in 1996 that redesigned the interior spaces for use as apartments, but was later abandoned. It underwent a complete exterior restoration in 2023.
Villa Serra Doria Masnata		Overlooking Via Cantore, it was originally built in 1613 by Bartolomeo Bianco for the nobleman Paolo Serra. Later the property passed to the Doria family, which owned it until the early 19th century. During the siege of Genoa in 1746-1747, General Antoniotto Botta Adorno, commander of the Austrian troops, stayed there. Passed to the Masnata family, it was given by them to the municipality of Sampierdarena, which in 1874 made it the first home of the hospital, which operated until 1916, when the one at Villa Scassi was inaugurated. After briefly housing the municipal library, it has been a school since 1933. The building is in classical Alessian style; with the opening of Via Cantore, it lost its front garden and with the successive restorations over time, both the façade and the frescoes inside were lost.
Villa Doria De Mari, now the Don Daste Institute		Salita Belvedere, 2. Built in the sixteenth century for the Doria family and extensively remodeled in the eighteenth century with the introduction of neoclassical elements, it still preserves frescoes and stuccos of the period; today it houses the Institute of Divine Providence.
Villa Crosa De Franchi, now the Antonian Institute		Salita Belvedere, 5. It belonged to the Crosa family, the same family that owned Villa Crosa Diana, which had a modest country house with an adjoining chapel dedicated to Our Lady of Mercy in a place called Cima della Crosetta. The building, a typical pre-Alessian Genoese villa, was acquired by the De Franchi family at an unspecified time and later passed to the "Antonian Institute of the Daughters of Divine Zeal".
Villa Rossi		Salita Belvedere, 18. Attested to be the property of Sebastiano Pallavicini, whose family had large estates in the Sampiardarenese area, the villa is a typical example of a “villa coltiva,” that is, intended for the management and maintenance of farmland on the particularly steep western hillside of the Salita del Belvedere. Ancient but without any interesting details, it has a niche with a Madonna on the portal; above the doorpost is a relief with “the Agnus”; on the column uphill from the doorway is the inscription “villa Rossi.”
Villa Tomati		Located on Colle degli Angeli and at the top of Salita degli Angeli, it is one of the oldest preserved villas in Genoa. The complex consists of two lateral buildings and a central one. Among the lateral ones, one features a double order of loggias and is open. The interiors show late Gothic influences, making the villa one of the few Genoese examples of a late medieval villa. Modified with interventions between the 17th and 19th centuries, which have been preserved until modern times, the building, owned by A.R.T.E., is mostly home to the Arci 30 Giugno club, with the remaining part used as apartments.
Villa Frisone		Corso Martinetti, 147. Also known by the name of Villa Frixone, it is an 18th-century building intended by the family as a villa for cultivation and control over the busy traffic of the road that runs along it. In the 19th century it was extensively remodeled. The L-shaped palace is set on the ridge and still has a large sloping plot of land. Inside, only the main floor retains 19th-century frescoes and, in one room, there is a coat of arms. To this day the building is used as a private residence, but it is in a state of disrepair.

=== Villas of the Polcevera Valley ===
==== Campi, Fegino, Borzoli ====
Villa	Image	Description
Villa Imperiale Casanova		Built by the Spinola family in the second half of the 16th century, it was the site, at the time of the Republic of Genoa, of parties and banquets for illustrious guests before their official entry into the city. The villa, which stands in Campi, in the Polcevera Valley, at the foot of the Coronata hill and behind the current shopping centers, is now being restored after years of decay. At the time of the democratic republic, between 1799 and 1800, Prince Imperiale, a supporter of the French, used to organize parties at his villa in Campi attended by the pro-French republican elite. These parties were attended by Ugo Foscolo, who had joined the National Guard and was taking part with French troops in the defense of Genoa.
Villa Cattaneo dell'Olmo		It is located in the northernmost part of the Campi area, bordering the Rivarolo district and close to the Badia del Boschetto; it is home to the Ansaldo Foundation, which collects paper archives, photographs and period films from many historic Genoese companies.
Villa Spinola Raggi Pignone Parodi		Via Evandro Ferri, 11, Genova (Fegino). It was built halfway up the hillside of Fegino in the 18th century and constituted, together with the lost Villa Durazzo-Cataldi in San Quirico, a remarkable example of Rococo architecture. The vast park that surrounded it was transformed around the mid-twentieth century into an oil depot by the Permolio company, compromising the area in both landscape and environmental terms. After the facilities were decommissioned, a redevelopment plan is underway. The property is in poor condition of maintenance but still intact in its construction features and interior finishes; noteworthy are the interior staircase, the 19th-century pictorial decorations and the large nymphaeum at the back of the building. (Pictured is the villa as photographed by Paolo Monti in 1964).
Villa Doria Grimaldi "La Commenda"		The villa consists of an ancient installation, the Commenda Gerosolimitana, known as the Commenda dell'Epifania del Signore, founded in the early 17th century by Friar Francesco Lomellino for the benefit of his family. It consists of a heterogeneous group of dwellings including a very old tower with a vault, some old houses and a Baroque-style villa called “Villa Elisa.” Although formally belonging to the order of the Knights Hospitaller, the commenda was linked to the Lomellini family, passing to the founder's heirs until, due to family quarrels, it was given to the Knights of Malta. Today the complex is in an uneven state of preservation, with some buildings elegantly restored and others in a precarious state of repair.

==== Rivarolo ====
Villa	Image	Description
Villa Pallavicini		Piazza Durazzo Pallavicini, 22, Genova (Rivarolo). It stands in the center of Rivarolo, overlooking the square of the same name; it is now in a state of disrepair after having long been the site of decentralized municipal offices. Built in the 18th century by the Durazzo Pallavicini family on an earlier 15th- or 16th-century structure according to a French-inspired architectural model, it consists of a central building and two separate side buildings around a courtyard and was originally surrounded by a vast garden, part of which was lost as early as the 19th century due to the urban expansion of the village of Rivarolo. What was left of the park disappeared for good around the middle of the twentieth century due to new urbanization and the construction of the two railway viaducts that cross the neighborhood passing near the villa.

==== Murta ====
Villa	Image	Description
Villa Bonarota Doria Costa "Clorinda"		Via Massucone Mazzini, 56 – via Monfenera, 11, Genova (Trasta). Villa Bonarota, known as “Villa Clorinda,” was built in the 17th century on the hill of Murta, dominating the Polcevera valley, near the village of Lastrico; it belonged to several wealthy Genoese families (Bonarota, Doria and Costa) and today, with renovation in the 1980s, after years of neglect, it has been turned into an apartment building; it still has a large park. From April to July 1747, during the Austrian occupation of the Polcevera Valley, it was the headquarters of the occupants' general staff.
Villa Noli Prato Cerruti "Paola"		Salita Murta, 17, Genova (Murta). Villa Noli Prato Cerruti, known as “Villa Paola,” also stands on the hill of Murta. Built in the 18th century and surrounded by a large tree-lined park, still well preserved, it was, according to Persoglio, "perhaps the most beautiful for architecture, for gardens and alleys, for perspective, of all those in Murta." Today it has been converted into a residential building; the chapel on the ground floor, decorated with frescoes and a marble altar, is particularly noteworthy.

==== Bolzaneto ====
Villa	Image	Description
Villa Ghersi-Carrega		Via Costantino Reta, 3, Genova (Bolzaneto). Built in the 17th century, it is located along the “Via Nazionale” at the entrance to Bolzaneto coming from Rivarolo. During his stay in Genoa (1624-1627) the Flemish painter Anthony van Dyck was a guest there. Today it is the seat of Municipio V - Valpolcevera.
Pastorino Castle		Derived from the transformation in the early 20th century of a 15th-century fort that had been abandoned for a long time, it was purchased by the Pastorino family and transformed first into a country villa with an English-style park, then, by the will of Carlo Pastorino, into a hospital, active until the 1980s. It currently houses a residence for the elderly and a “hospice” for terminally ill patients, named after Gigi Ghirotti.
Villa Cambiaso		Via Cremeno, Genova (Cremeno). Built in the 18th century near the hamlet of Cremeno, it was the summer residence of Giovanni Battista Cambiaso, doge of the Republic of Genoa from 1771 to 1773, who had the Polcevera valley road built at his own expense. Today it has been converted into a residential building.

==== Pontedecimo ====
Villa	Image	Description
Villa Ravara-Ottonello		Via D. Meirana, 13, Genoa in the Pontedecimo district. Built by the Ravara family in 1793 in neoclassical style, designed by Carlo Barabino. Today it has been converted into a residential building.
Villa Pittaluga-Piuma	sinistra	Via N. Gallino, 116, Genoa (Pontedecimo), Built by the Pittaluga family in the 18th century, it became the holiday residence of the Piuma Marquises in 1812. The eighteenth-century volume with longitudinal development is articulated on the rectangular lunette atrium space that serves the main floor with a side staircase. The original interior spaces were remodeled in the late 19th or early 20th century by the Piuma family, who enlarged the villa with the addition of some spaces at the back of the villa. Today it is abandoned.
Villa Millo, now called “Navone”		Salita a Cesino, Genova (Cesino). With a cappella gentilizia and two wooden chalets decorated with anchors, recalling the connection of the Millo family, shipowners at the port of Genoa, and the sea. The Millo Quarter in Genoa's Old Port is reminiscent of the family. Today it has been converted into a residential building.
Villa Roccatagliata		Via Benedetto da Cesino, Genova (Cesino). Today it has been converted into a residential building. Features a large park, outbuildings, and an equestrian field.
Villa Amalia		Via Madonna delle Vigne, Genova (Cesino). Today it has been converted into a residential building. Features a turret and a chapel.

=== Villas of the western part of the city ===
==== Cornigliano ====
In Cornigliano, too, there are numerous patrician villas that are older than those in the surrounding districts, such as Sampierdarena. The villas of Cornigliano are the first embryos of the phenomenon of the suburban patrician villa, and some of them date back to the 14th century (as in the case of Villa Spinola Narisano and Villa Spinola Dufour). The road along which they were aligned, originally called "Via Dorata" and which followed the route of the ancient Via Aurelia (which has been set back from today's Via Cornigliano, but is still present in some sections), started from the Cornigliano bridge and passed at the foot of the Coronata hill, continuing towards Sestri Ponente. The villas of Cornigliano went through a period of great decline, when the nobility of the city preferred to stay in other districts to the west. They were later rediscovered in the eighteenth century with the restoration and remodeling of some buildings, and in the nineteenth century was built one of the most famous nineteenth century villas in Genoa: Castello Raggio.

Castello Raggio was built in the 1880s by the architect Luigi Rovelli for the entrepreneur Edilio Raggio, after the model of Miramare Castle in Trieste. The "castle" stood on the promontory of Sant'Andrea, formerly the site of a Benedictine monastery, and until World War I the Raggio family housed high representatives of the nobility and politics. With the Second World War and the reclamation of the sea in front of it for the construction of the Ilva steelworks, it was abandoned and fell into a state of decay and was demolished in 1951.

Villa	Image	Description
Villa Durazzo Bombrini		It was built starting in 1752 by French architect Pierre Paul De Cotte for Marquis Giacomo Filippo II Durazzo. With an unusual choice in the Genoese landscape of the time, still tied to the classic sixteenth-century Alessian model, but now established in the transalpine context, the villa consists of a central building with Rococo-style decorations with two side wings around a vast courtyard. Considered the most prestigious of Cornigliano's villas in the mid-19th century, it was sold by the Durazzo family and later purchased by the Savoy family. Between 1865 and 1866 Prince Oddone of Savoy lived the last months of his brief existence in the villa. It later passed to the Bombrini family, who in 1928 made it the headquarters of the Ansaldo offices. After World War II it became the headquarters of Italsider, since 2008 in the context of redevelopment of the neighborhood it houses offices, the provincial employment center and the Genoa Liguria Film Commission. It preserves the tower, the remarkable cantilevered staircase, numerous frescoed halls, the Italian garden on the front and part of the back garden, used as a public park.
Villa Domenico Serra		Via Cornigliano 17. Town hall of the autonomous municipality of Cornigliano Ligure until its suppression in 1926, then seat of the Cornigliano municipal district until the 1990s, it is currently home to the local municipal police department. It preserves the garden, used as a public park (Giardini Luciano Melis); while the decorations of the interiors were lost due to bombing damage.
Villa Serra Richini		Eighteenth-century villa with an elegant neoclassical facade that retains almost intact an Italianate garden arranged on three levels connected by two scenic symmetrical staircases adorned with balustrades and flower boxes and a long marble railing to surround them; there are also fountains and grotto nymphaea carved into the embankments of the three levels.
Villa Spinola Canepa		The palace retains many elements of the original 15th/16th-century structure and is therefore architecturally valuable. Elements usually difficult to trace such as umbrella vaults have also been preserved. Inside, the original frescoes from the period of the building's construction are preserved.
Villa Gentile Bickley		Restored in 1998 after a long period of deterioration. Current home of the “Guerrazzi” civic library, it preserves some frescoed halls, the 18th-century kitchen, the tower and a small part of the garden, used as a public park.
Villa Spinola Muratori		Via Nino Cervetto 23-25. An important palace built in several phases. A section containing the stairwell is added to the ancient structure to the east, and to the west, along the street, there is a section that allows for the creation of a scenic three-part façade, of markedly Alessian inspiration, with a central loggia. Internally there is a fine staircase with columns. Badly damaged in the mid-18th century during the War of Austrian Succession, it was first converted into a factory and then, after the mid-19th century, into apartments. The tower was once connected to the palace.
Villa Spinola Narisano		Viale Narisano 14. Home to the civic center and administrative offices of Municipio VI Medio Ponente. Preserves the tower and some frescoed halls.
Villa Spinola Dufour		The Villa Spinola Dufour complex is divided into two separate but adjoining villas (called "di levante (east)" and "di ponente (west )"). The east villa, formerly the residence of the architect Maurizio Dufour and currently the site of receptions and conferences, has been carefully restored and presents almost entirely the original features, including slate and terracotta floors, frescoed salons, a significant portion of the original fresco on the facade, the tower and a large part of the park. The west villa, which also still has a tower, is home to the oratory of the church of S. Giacomo.
Villa Doria Cevasco		The Villa Doria di Cornigliano complex includes two aristocratic buildings on Via San Giacomo Apostolo (Villa Doria Cevasco by the sea and Villa Doria Dufour upstream), now incorporated within the Valletta Rio San Pietro Urban Park. Both buildings are reduced to ruins and overgrown by vegetation (in Paolo Monti's 1963 image: on the left the ruins of Villa Doria Cevasco Dufour, heavily damaged by World War II bombing, while on the right the tower, now isolated, formerly part of the adjacent Palazzo Spinola Muratori. In the background the gasometers of the steelworks, now demolished)
Villa Pallavicini Raggi		Via dei Domenicani, 5. The large palace, parallelepiped in shape and with the main elevation surmounted by a lively Baroque frieze, preserves intact the Renaissance-style ground floor and staircase, rich in carved stone architectural elements; the upper floors are more recent and probably date from a 17th-century renovation. Split into apartments in the early 20th century.
Villa Marchese		Via San Giacomo Apostolo 4. It has belonged to the Marchese family since the late eighteenth century. The regular body of the building is devoid of exterior decoration and covered by a large hipped roof. The main elevation is embellished by an imposing central loggia, which once overlooked a terrace that was later elevated. More than others, the villa retains its agricultural character with the grounds in the valley once cultivated and lined with pergola-lined paths.
Villa Pavese Dufour		Via Tonale 37-39. The complex architecture of the building, which runs along the street, appears to be the result of an intervention that incorporates several pre-existing buildings. Among them is an elegant Baroque chapel whose grandiose marble altar, which was removed, is now in Novalesa Abbey in the Susa Valley. In the lower part of the building, toward the sea, a cross-vaulted portico opened onto the garden and at the back gave access to a series of rooms: three with large barrel vaults and a third with umbrella vaults on stone corbels, testifying to an early phase of the construction of the villa. Very little is known with certainty before its purchase in the early twentieth century by Luigia Pavese Dufour.
Villa Spinola De Ferrari		Built by Bartolomeo Bianco for Gio Domenico Spinola from 1621. It is characterized by the scenic symmetrical staircase that leads from the atrium to the upper floor. It is part of the Calasanzio Institute.
Villa Invrea, today Calasanzio Institute		It belonged to the Invrea family in the 18th century and was later incorporated into the Serra property; today it houses the rooms of the Calasanzio Institute.
Villa De Franchi Musso		The old mansion with a small tower flanking it overlooks the central part of the path of the villas, but the modification of the driveway makes it difficult to identify from the street today. Divided into apartments.
Villa Adorno Carbone		Divided into apartments, still of great scenic value.
Villa Spinola Grillo		The building abuts the high embankment between road and garden, today divided into apartments.
Villa De Mari Dufour		Former property of the de Mari family, it belonged to botanist Luigi Dufour in the late 19th century - today it is used as a school.
Villa Raggio degli Erzelli		Also known as Villa Vivaldi Pasqua, it is a mansion that incorporated the Cistercian abbey of Sant'Andrea (12th century). It retains the tower, much of the park and the hunting lodge on top of the hill. After the Napoleonic suppressions of religious orders in 1798, the abbey was purchased by Duke Pietro Vivaldi Pasqua, who transformed it into a stately villa, profoundly altering the complex while preserving the original Gothic style. After several changes of ownership in 1879, along with the entire surrounding area, the entire estate was purchased by the entrepreneur Edilio Raggio, who built the Raggio Castle a short distance away. Severely damaged during World War II and later restored, it became the headquarters of companies and research organizations until the mid-1990s. Renovated again since 2008 after several years of neglect, it houses the headquarters of a number of companies.

==== Sestri Ponente ====
Villa	Image	Description
Villa Rossi		Built by the Lomellini family in the 17th century, it was later given to the Spinola family; in 1855 it was purchased by the Rossi-Martini, a Genoese banking family, who enlarged the park. In 1893 Elisabeth of Austria, better known as “Princess Sissi,” was a guest there. In 1931 it was bought by the municipality of Genoa, which used the main building as an elementary school until 2004; it was renovated and now houses a cultural center. The park, the green lung of the Sestri Ponente district, rich in various exotic and native species, measures about 4 hectares.
Villa Maria De Mari		Built in the 16th century, it passed in the 18th century to the De Mari family, which gave the building its current appearance, then in 1771 to the Spinola family, in 1896 to the Rossi Martini bankers, and finally in 1939 to the Rollino family. The large park and Italian garden were completely lost to the building expansion of the 1960s while the villa is in a state of neglect. The space in front is occupied by a bowling alley for Ansaldo employees.
Villa Spinola Pallavicino		Built in the early eighteenth century, it stands along the coast to the west of the suburb at Via S. Alberto 5. After several changes of ownership it was purchased in the twentieth century by the Sestrese Bagnara family, one of whose members, a lay nun of the Oblates of St. Benedict, used it as a women's orphanage and kindergarten, naming it the Little House of the Sacred Heart. Now owned, by bequest, by the Benedictines, it is in a state of semi-neglect. Over time it has lost its uphill park but has preserved part of the park that originally reached directly to the sea.
Villa Parodi		Built in the second half of the seventeenth century, it was donated in 1735 by Stefano Spinola to the Jesuits, who, in order to adapt it for use as a convent, profoundly modified its structure. In the 19th century, after a succession of new owners, including the Durazzo family, it is currently owned by the municipality of Genoa. It retains part of the garden and is used as an educational institution.
Villa Sciallero-Carbone		It stands in the area of San Giovanni Battista, on the hill behind the center of the neighborhood. Dating back to the 16th century, it was purchased in 1974 by the municipality of Genoa for use as a kindergarten and other uses.

==== Pegli ====
Villa	Image	Description
Villa Durazzo-Pallavicini		Best known for its park, it is one of Pegli's most significant landmarks. The large park is among the largest historic gardens in Europe. The villa stands in a dominant position on the hill of San Martino. Villa and park in their present forms date back to the mid-19th century, but the complex has its origins from an 18th-century villa of the Grimaldi family, completely renovated by Michele Canzio between 1840 and 1846 for Ignazio Alessandro Pallavicini, distant nephew of Clelia Durazzo, founder of the botanical garden that bears her name. The park, which was opened to the public, immediately became a source of great attraction, boasting thousands of visitors annually. Donated in 1928 by the Pallavicini family to the municipality of Genoa, the palace has housed the Museum of Ligurian Archaeology since 1936. In 2017, it won the award for Italy's Most Beautiful Park.
Villa Doria Centurione		Villa Doria Centurione, an example of pre-Alessian Mannerist architecture, was built in 1540 for the banker Adamo Centurione. Around 1580 it became the property of his nephew Giovanni Andrea Doria, who between 1590 and 1592 had it renovated and enlarged by Andrea Ceresola, known as “il Vannone.” Remaining in the Doria family's ownership until 1908, after several changes of ownership in 1926 it passed to the Genoa municipality and in 1930 became the site of the Civic Naval Museum and a branch of the “Giuseppe Mazzini” classical high school. Inside there are 16th-century frescoes by Nicolosio Granello, Ottavio Semino and Lazzaro Tavarone. In the vast park, now public, there is an artificial pond with a small island in the center, a “fairy island” made by Galeazzo Alessi for Centurione.
Villa Lomellini Rostan		Located in the Multedo area, it is situated a short distance from the Varenna stream; it was built in the sixteenth century by the Lomellini family and restored in the eighteenth century by Agostino Lomellini, a politician and man of letters, who in 1784, after his retirement from political life, commissioned Tagliafichi to design the English garden, one of the most beautiful and admired in Europe. It passed by inheritance to the Rostan family, which in the nineteenth century hosted illustrious personalities from all over Europe. Again by way of inheritance, it passed to the Reggio family. It preserves in its interior a cycle of frescoes by Bernardo Castello. On the other hand, the garden designed by Tagliafichi disappeared in the second half of the 20th century, when part of it was turned into a soccer field and the rest sacrificed for the construction of oil depots and the highway interchange. Still owned by the Reggio marquises, since 2005 it has housed the headquarters of Genoa CFC, which already used the pitch as a training facility.
Villa Rosa		Formerly Villa Lomellini nel Fossato, it is a 17th-century villa that originally belonged to the Lomellini family; since the early 20th century it has housed an elementary school. Expropriated by the municipality in 1975 to industrialist Francesco Berta, it underwent extensive restoration in the early 1990s.
Villa Granara		It is located in the area of Tre Ponti, at the beginning of the Varenna valley, and is a typical example of a Genoese villa, now divided into apartments; it stands on the left bank of the Varenna stream and is connected to the main road by an eighteenth-century stone bridge.

==== Pra' ====
Villa	Image	Description
Villa Sauli Podestà		Located in the Prà district, also known as "Villa della Baronessa," it was built in the 17th century and belonged to the Sauli family until it was purchased by Luca Podestà (1848). It is currently home to the Ponente Employment Center.
Villa Doria Podestà		Built in 1629 to a design by Bartolomeo Bianco for Giacomo Lomellini, doge in the two-year period of 1625-1627, it later passed to the Doria family and in 1847 to Luca Podestà (who later also purchased the neighboring Villa Sauli, thus unifying its various agricultural appurtenances). The construction of the coastal road sacrificed the external staircase. Attached laterally to the villa on the west side is the small neoclassical chapel. In the second half of the 19th century, it was the holiday residence of Baron Andrea Podestà, mayor of Genoa. It is currently home to the Parco del Basilico di Pra'. (Pictured is Villa Doria Podestà in a 1964 photo by Paolo Monti)
Villa Adorno Piccardo		Built probably in the 15th century for the Adorno family, it was purchased by Francesco Piccardo in the 19th century. Around 1630 it was enlarged by Bartolomeo Bianco at the behest of Giovanni Battista Adorno; the villa underwent further modifications with the addition of two low side wings with a balustraded terrace. Severely damaged during World War II, it lost the large park that surrounded it in the 1960s. Divided into apartments, it is now a private condominium.
Villa Pinelli Negrone De Mari		Built by the Pinellis in the 16th century, it was flanked by a tower in 1580. In 1634 it too was enlarged by Bartolomeo Bianco at the behest of Filippo Maria Pinelli. In the 18th century the property passed first to Ambrogio Negrone and then to the De Mari family. The original part, attributed to Bianco, is recognizable in the central area of the palace; the two bodies added laterally are the result of an 18th-century extension. Around 1960, when it became the seat of the Ursuline Sisters' boarding school, some buildings were added on the uphill side. The Ursuline school remained active until 1991. Today the villa houses public offices.
Villa Cortese "Don Daste"		Originally a patrician villa, the building has now been completely converted into a nursery school run by the Don Daste sisters.
Villa Negrone della Loggia		Known as “Villa Fiammetta,” it is located immediately east of the Branega stream. Built by Bendinelli Negrone in 1601, it combines the function of a holiday residence with that of a fortress to defend the Negrone estate, which extended to the Branega valley. It preserves inside frescoes by Giovanni Andrea Ansaldo.
Villa Negrone di San Pietro		It is located in Via Cordanieri and is part of the San Pietro complex, a 12th-century Cistercian convent transformed in 1642 into a villa residence by the Grimaldis by partially demolishing the Romanesque church, of which the bell tower remains. The property later passed to the Negrone family. The architectural volume is for the most part occupied by a large hall connected to the front yard and garden by two symmetrical vestibules.

==== Voltri ====
Villa	Image	Description
Villa Duchessa di Galliera		The structure of the villa, in the Voltri district, was developed in several stages: the oldest part, called "Paraxo," built by the aristocratic Mandillo family; the central part, which corresponds to the seventeenth-century nucleus; and the two side wings added in the eighteenth century by the Brignole Sale family, which had acquired it in 1675. Various members of the family had the garden, terraces and staircase built. The garden in the first half of the nineteenth century was internationally renowned for its camellias and citrus collection; illustrious guests were welcomed there throughout the century. In 1888 Maria Brignole Sale De Ferrari, duchess of Galliera, who had commissioned the garden in 1872, bequeathed the property to the Opera Pia Brignole Sale. The historic park, covering about 32 hectares, 25 of which are open to the public, has belonged since 1985 to the municipality of Genoa, which had already had it in use since 1931. The park extends to the top of the hill where the sanctuary of Madonna delle Grazie stands, where are the graves of the Duchess of Galliera, her husband Raffaele de Ferrari and some family members.
Villa Lomellini De Mari		The villa stands in Vesima, the last hamlet west of the municipality of Genoa. It derives from a religious complex dating from the 12th century founded by the Vento family. It passed in the 13th century from the Crutched Friars to the Cistercian nuns, who remained there until the mid-16th century when they moved to Genoa, to the convent of Santa Maria in Passione; the monastery was sold to the Lomellini Sorba family, which turned it into a patrician villa. It changed hands several times in 1904 and became the property of Marquise Teresa Pallavicini, widow of Negrotto Cambiaso. It was renovated and is now divided into private apartments.
Villa Giustiniani		It was part of the numerous properties of the Giustiniani family in Voltri. It features structural elements typical of 15th- and 16th-century Genoese villas. In 1830, Camillo Benso, Count of Cavour, then a young officer of the Savoy Corps of Engineers, was a guest there, and it was there that he met Marquise Nina Giustiniani, with whom he would start an important friendship. Today the villa houses a kindergarten, stores and private homes.
Villa d'Albertis		Overlooking the sea along the road leading to the hamlet of Crevari, it was built in the 17th century by the Spinola family; passed to the Centurione family, in 1870 it was purchased by the entrepreneur Bartolomeo D'Albertis (brother of the better-known explorer Enrico Alberto d'Albertis), owner in Voltri of paper mills in the Leira valley, bringing the villa to its current structure, with four floors, a loggia on the west and a tower on the east. Today the villa houses an apartment building.
Villa Dongo Piccardo		Located on Lemerle Street in the center of town, it was originally the center of a large garden and agricultural estate, which were lost first with the construction of the railway line and then permanently due to its doubling. Inside are eighteenth-century frescoes by Voltri painter Giuseppe Canepa. It is home to the mental health center of the local ASL.

=== Villas of the Bisagno Valley ===
Villa	Image	Description
Villa Imperiale		It stands in the Terralba area of San Fruttuoso in the Bisagno Valley and is surrounded by a large park. Built in the late 15th century for Lorenzo Cristoforo Cattaneo, in 1502 it hosted King Louis XII of France, who was visiting Genoa. Completely remodeled in 1560, it preserves stucco and frescoes by artists of the time, including Luca Cambiaso's Rape of the Sabines in the vault of the first-floor hall. In the 17th century it passed first to the Salvago family and then to the Imperiale di Sant'Angelo family, from whom it takes its name; in the 1920s it was purchased by the municipality of Genoa and recently restored after years of decay. Today it houses the “G. Lercari” municipal library, a kindergarten and a social center for the elderly, while the park is used as a public garden.
Villa Piantelli		The Villa Centurione Musso Piantelli is located in the Marassi neighborhood and is now home to the Villa Piantelli cultural recreational club. The villa, which appears today squeezed between the stadium and the tenements of Corso De Stefanis, before urban expansion stood at the center of a large park that reached to the banks of the Bisagno River; it was built by the Centurione family in the second half of the 16th century, in a then purely agricultural setting, preserving until the early decades of the 20th century its open perspective toward the Bisagno and the hill behind. The building, characterized by two angular loggias, preserves inside frescoes by Bernardo Castello (1557-1629) with episodes from the Aeneid, Giovanni Andrea Ansaldo and other works by the Calvi school as well as Andrea and Cesare Semino.
Villa Saredo - Parodi		The 16th-century villa Saredo Parodi is located in Marassi, near the church of Santa Margherita; for several years it was home to decentralized offices of the Genoa municipality. In the chapel is a fresco by Valerio Castello depicting the Coronation of the Virgin; another fresco, by Domenico Fiasella (1589-1669) inspired by the myth of Diana and Endymion, is in the vault of the ground floor.
Villa Migone		It is located in San Fruttuoso, near Villa Imperiale; it is a building of medieval origin, enlarged in the 16th century and restored to its present neoclassical forms in 1792. On April 25, 1945, the act of surrender of the German troops to the National Liberation Committee was signed there through the mediation of Cardinal Boetto, temporarily a guest of the Migone family; this was the only case in Italy in which the German army surrendered to the partisan forces and not to the allied army, which had not yet arrived in the city.
Villa Durazzo Grimaldi Chiarella		Built in the early seventeenth century, it was the seat of the municipality of Bavari, which was suppressed in 1926.
Villa Durazzo a Pino Sottano		Built in the 17th century by the Durazzo family, now a retirement home, it has frescoes by Domenico Parodi and Bartolomeo Guidobono.
Villa Centurione Thellung		Located at the bottom of the hill of Fontanegli, a hamlet of the Struppa district, it was built in the seventeenth century and has the classic cubic layout with pyramidal roof in the Alessian style. It also belonged to the Mameli family in the nineteenth century, and according to some, Goffredo Mameli wrote Il Canto degli Italiani there in September 1847, but there is no historical evidence to confirm this claim.
Villa Ferretto		Located in a dominant position on the hill of Fontanegli, it was built starting in 1528 by the Ferretto family, originally from the Fontanabuona valley, and is the oldest of the villas on this hill in the Bisagno valley. Unlike the others, which are from a later period, it has an elongated rectangular structure, built up to match the hill's elevation. Modified several times inside, it still displays intact external architectural features. In the twentieth century it was the residence of the Dominican nuns, who ran the town's kindergarten and elementary schools, and is now a nursing home.
Villa Raggi		It is located near the church of St. Peter the Apostle in Fontanegli and has, like Villa Centurione Thellung, a cubic layout with a pyramidal roof. Built in the seventeenth century, after a period of neglect it has recently been restored.

== See also ==
- Genoa: Le Strade Nuove and the system of the Palazzi dei Rolli
- Parks of Genoa
