= Villa delle Peschiere =

Villa Pallavicino delle Peschiere
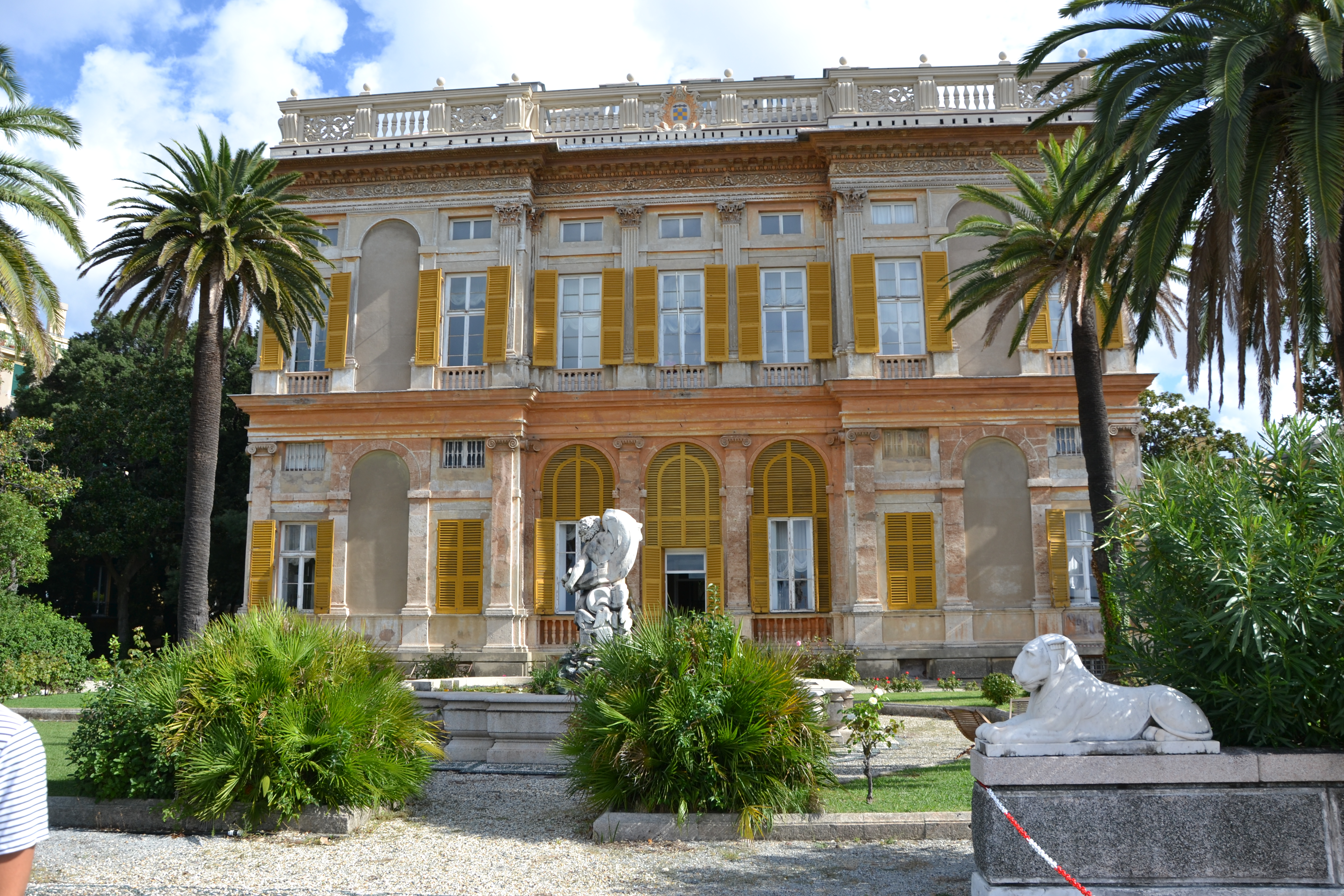
- Villa delle Peschiere, southern facade
- Interactive map of the Villa Pallavicino delle Peschiere area

General information
- Status: In use
- Type: Villa
- Architectural style: Mannerism
- Location: Via Bartolomeo degli Armeni, 25, Genoa, Italy
- Coordinates: 44.410935°N 8.942144°E
- Construction started: 1560
- Owner: Pallavicino family

Technical details
- Floor count: 5

Design and construction
- Architect: Galeazzo Alessi

Villa Pallavicino delle Peschiere is a 16th-century villa in Genoa, Northwestern Italy, built in 1560 for the nobleman Tobia Pallavicino. It is situated in via San Bartolomeo degli Armeni 25, in the quarter of Castelletto, in an area that, at the time when the villa was built, was still outside of the city walls. After the urban expansion of the 19th century, it is now located in the center of the city. The villa still belongs to the Pallavicino family.

== History ==
The villa was built in 1560 as a summer house for the Genoese nobleman Tobia Pallavicino, a wealthy merchant in alum, in an elevated area over the city which, in the 16th century, was still outside of the city walls. While the villa was being constructed, Tobia Pallavicino also commissioned his city palace in the Strada Nuova (Italian for "New Street", now via Garibaldi), known today as Palazzo Carrega-Cataldi.

Raffaele Soprani attributed the design of the villa to Galeazzo Alessi in 1674, although he still doubted whether “some reforms and additions" should not be attributed to Giovanni Battista Castello "il Bergamasco" instead, who was building a city palace for Tobia Pallavicino in the same period.

The villa underwent some alterations and a general restoration before 1846. In the second half of the 19th century, the large park was reduced in size to make way to the opening of via Peschiera.

Charles Dickens is one of the notable guests who stayed at the villa and described in his Pictures from Italy the views over the city and the Acquasola gardens which one could enjoy from the park.

== Description ==
=== Architecture ===
Galeazzo Alessi used in Villa delle Peschiere some new approaches to connect the garden and the interior of the villa. In particular, he built two main entrances, one on each side, thus realizing an organic continuity between the garden, the central rooms and the staircase. The southern facade is sumptuously decorated, with geometrical compositions and a decorative scheme of Ionic and Corinthian lesene

=== Decoration ===
The internal stuccoes and the hexagonal bathroom (a bizarre fashion of the time, documented in several Genoese villas, but preserved only in Villa delle Peschiere) were realized by Marcello Sparzo, a member of the school of Giovanni Battista Castello. The rich frescoes at the piano nobile, almost completely preserved, are attributed to Antonio Semino with some interventions by Luca Cambiaso, to whom is also attributed the mythological cycle of frescoes in the lateral rooms.

=== Landscaping ===
The garden, whose original condition is known today thanks to the drawings of Martin-Pierre Gauthier, has been greatly reduced in size in the 19th century when Via Peschiera was built. Part of the garden is still preserved in the area around the villa, which includes the fountain with a statue attributed to Gian Giacomo Vansoldo.

== See also ==
- Galeazzo Alessi
- Giovanni Battista Castello
- Luca Cambiaso
- Genoa
- Castelletto
- Villas of Genoa

== Bibliography ==
- Catalogo delle Ville Genovesi, Italia Nostra, Genova 1967, p. 100-117.
- Federico Alizeri, Guida Artistica della Citta di Genova, Genova 1846, p. 486.
- Raffaele Soprani, Le Vite de pittori scoltori et architetti genovesi, Genova, 1674
- Riccardo Luccardini, La Circonvallazione a Monte. Genova. Storia dell'espansione urbana dell'Ottocento, Genova, SAGEP, 2012, p. 52.
- Martin-Pierre Gauthier, Les plus beaux edifices de la ville de Genes, Paris, 1832, II, tav. 1–6.
- Charles Dickens, Pictures from Italy, Paris 1846, p. 37.
- Guida d'Italia Liguria, Touring Club Italiano, 2009, p. 181.

== Gallery ==
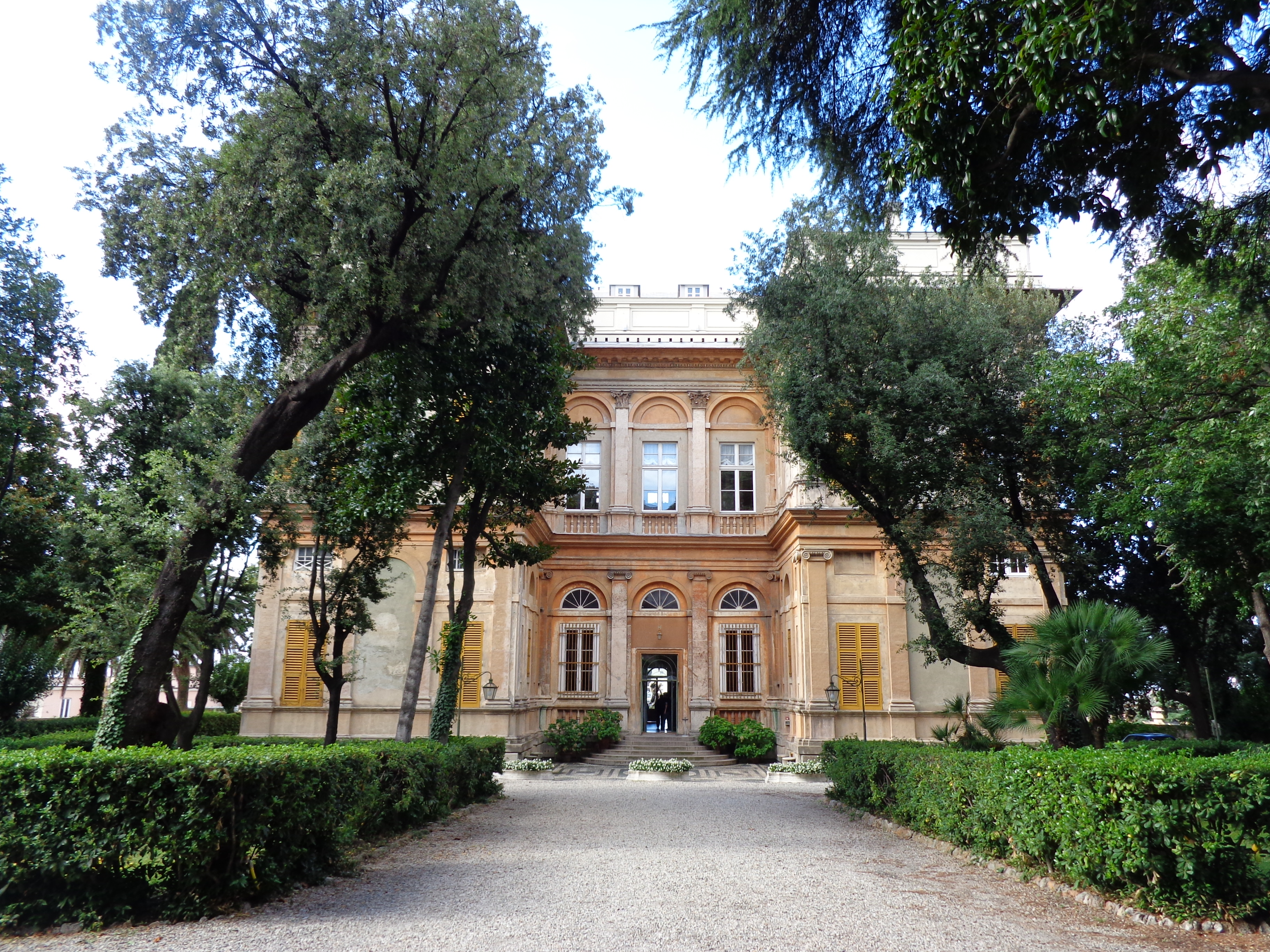
Villa Pallavicino delle Peschiere, north facade

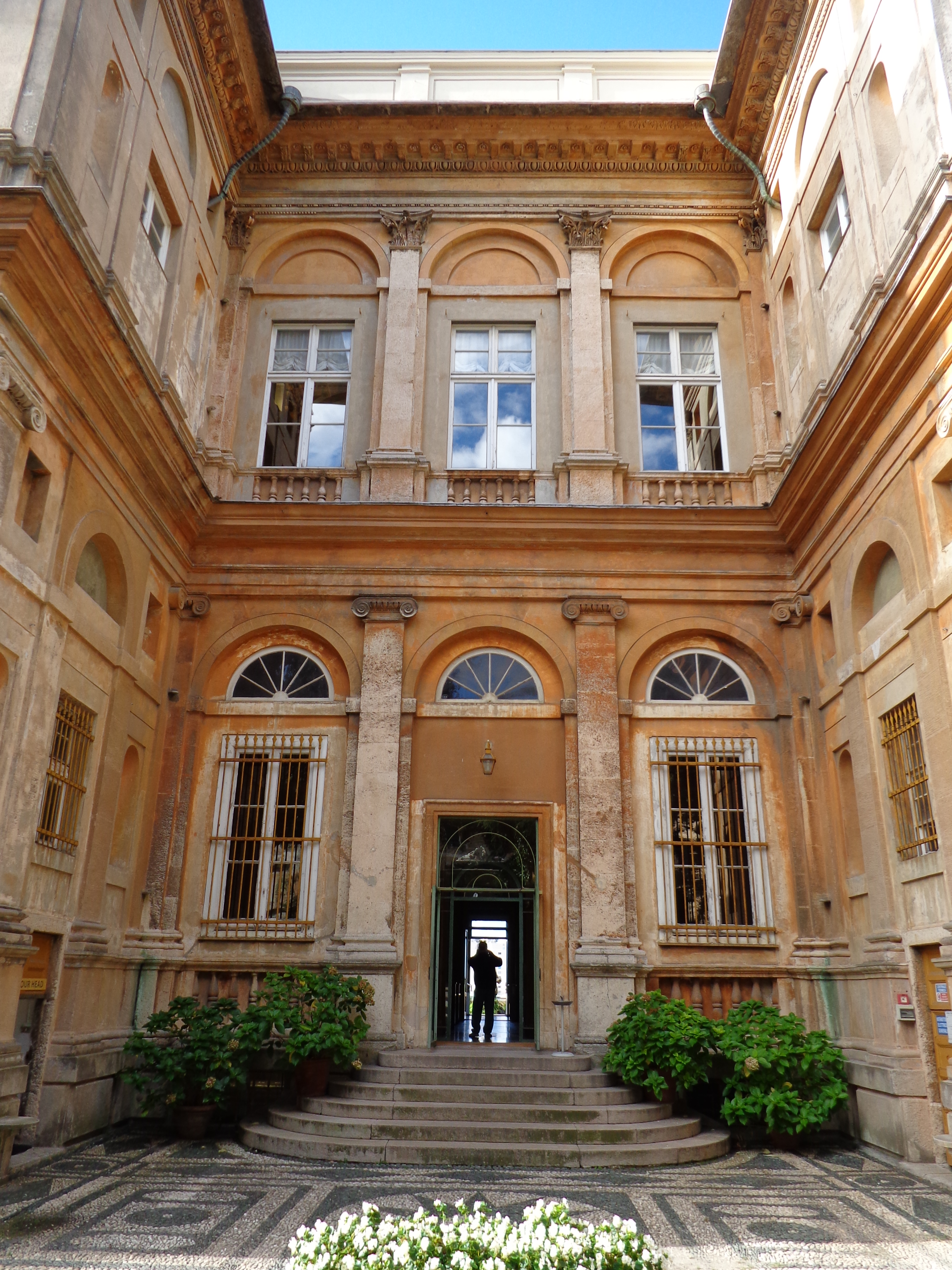
Villa Pallavicino delle Peschiere, north facade

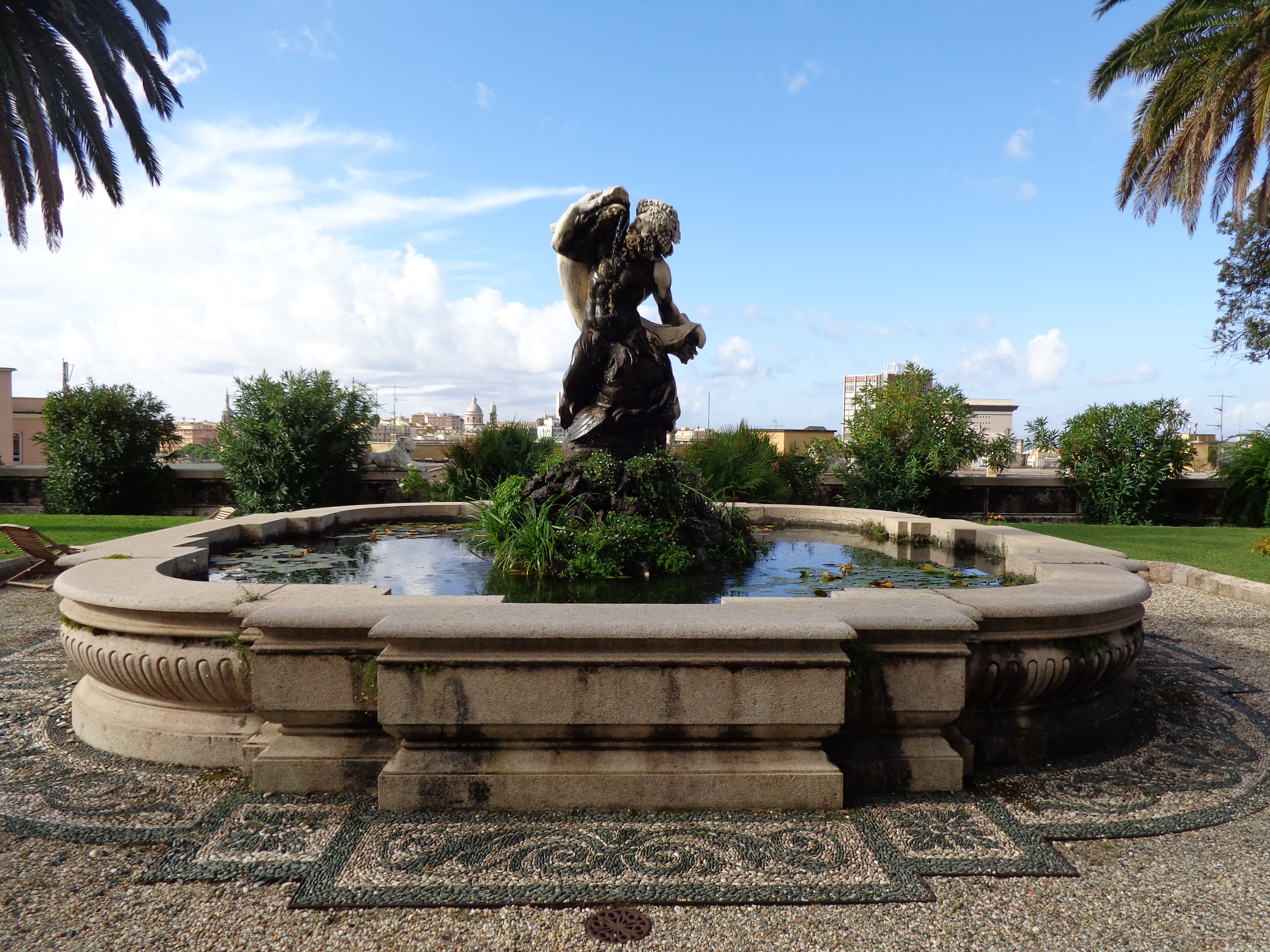
Villa Pallavicino delle Peschiere, fountain

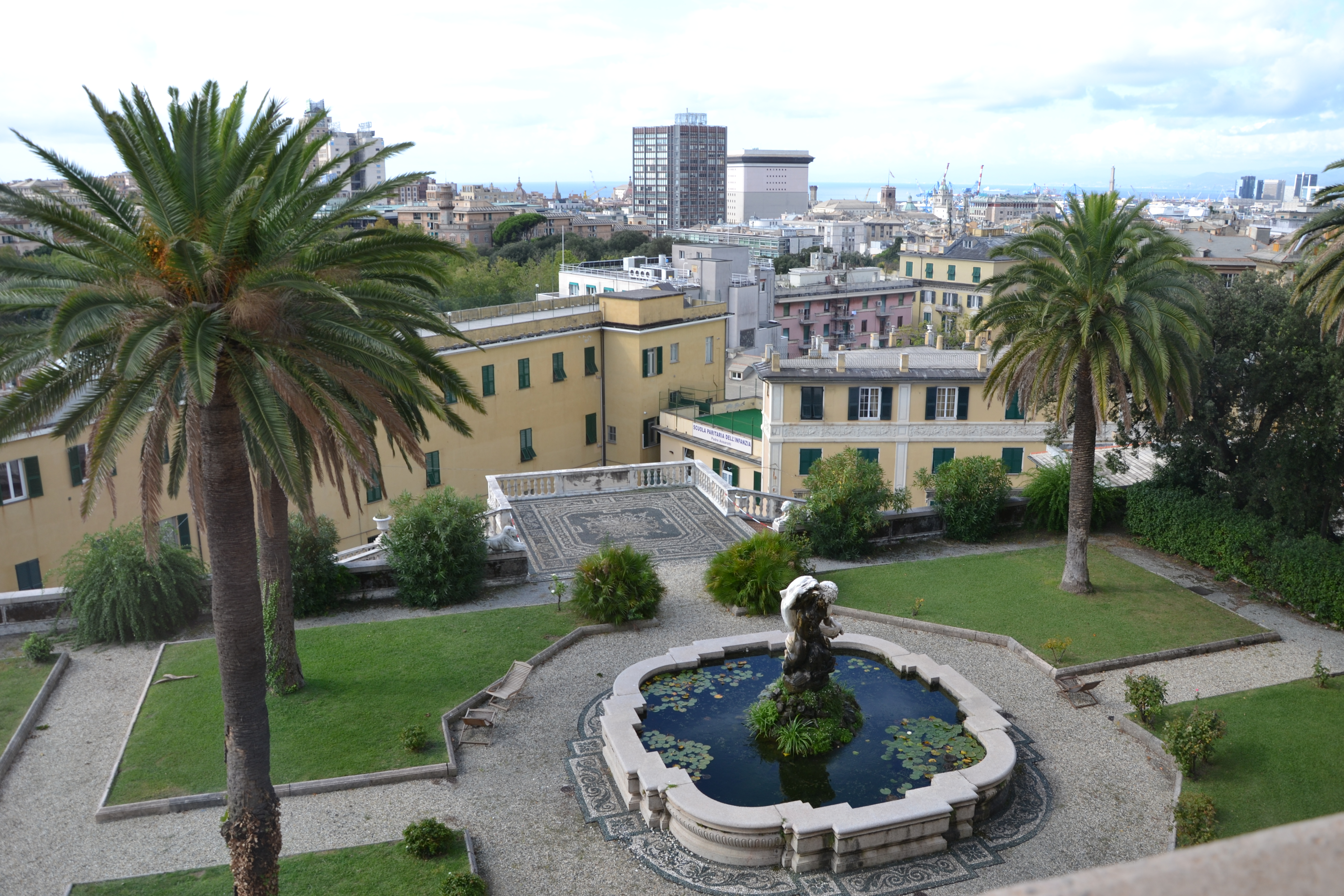
Villa Pallavicino delle Peschiere, fountain

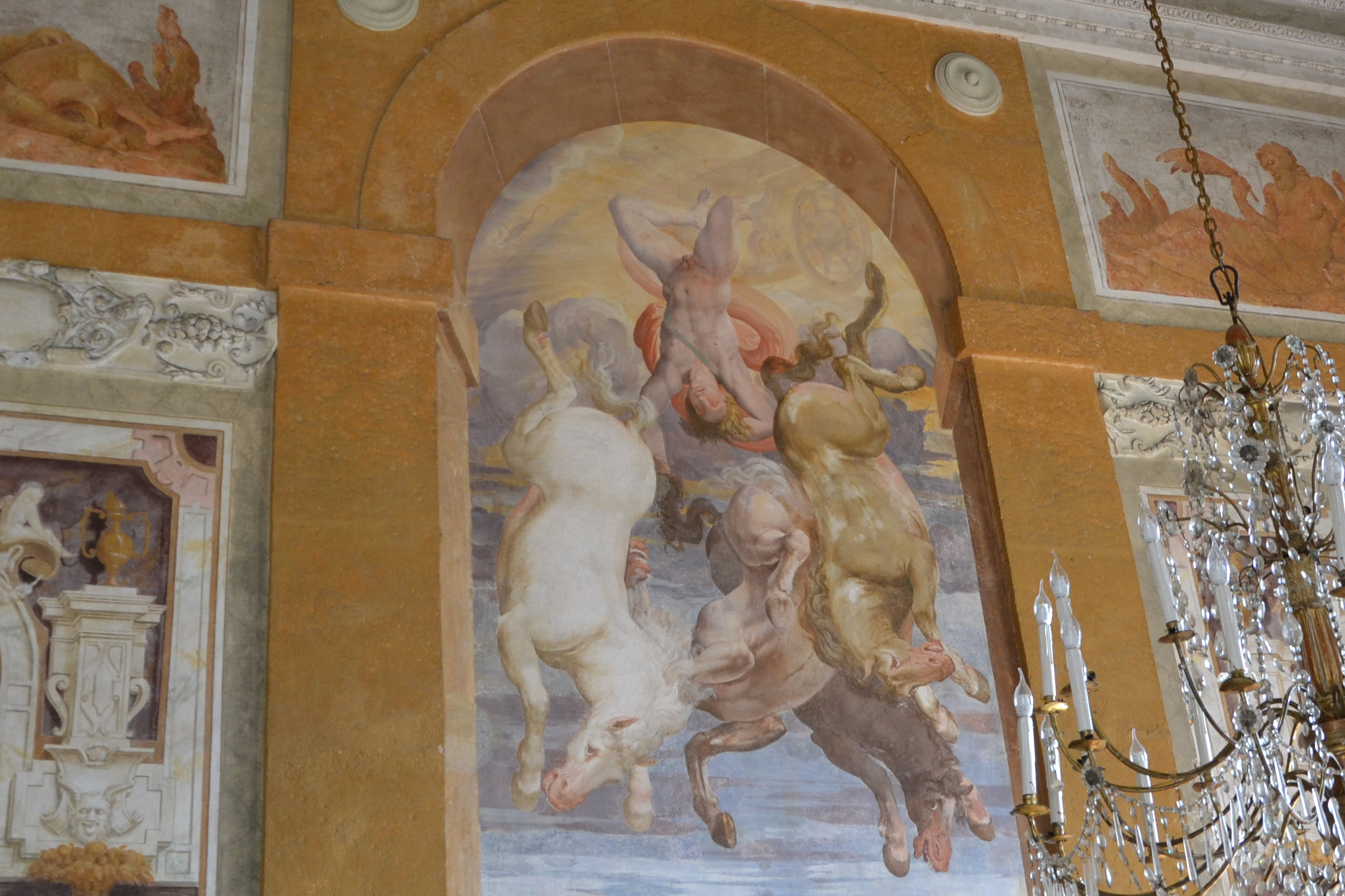
Villa Pallavicino delle Peschiere, interior

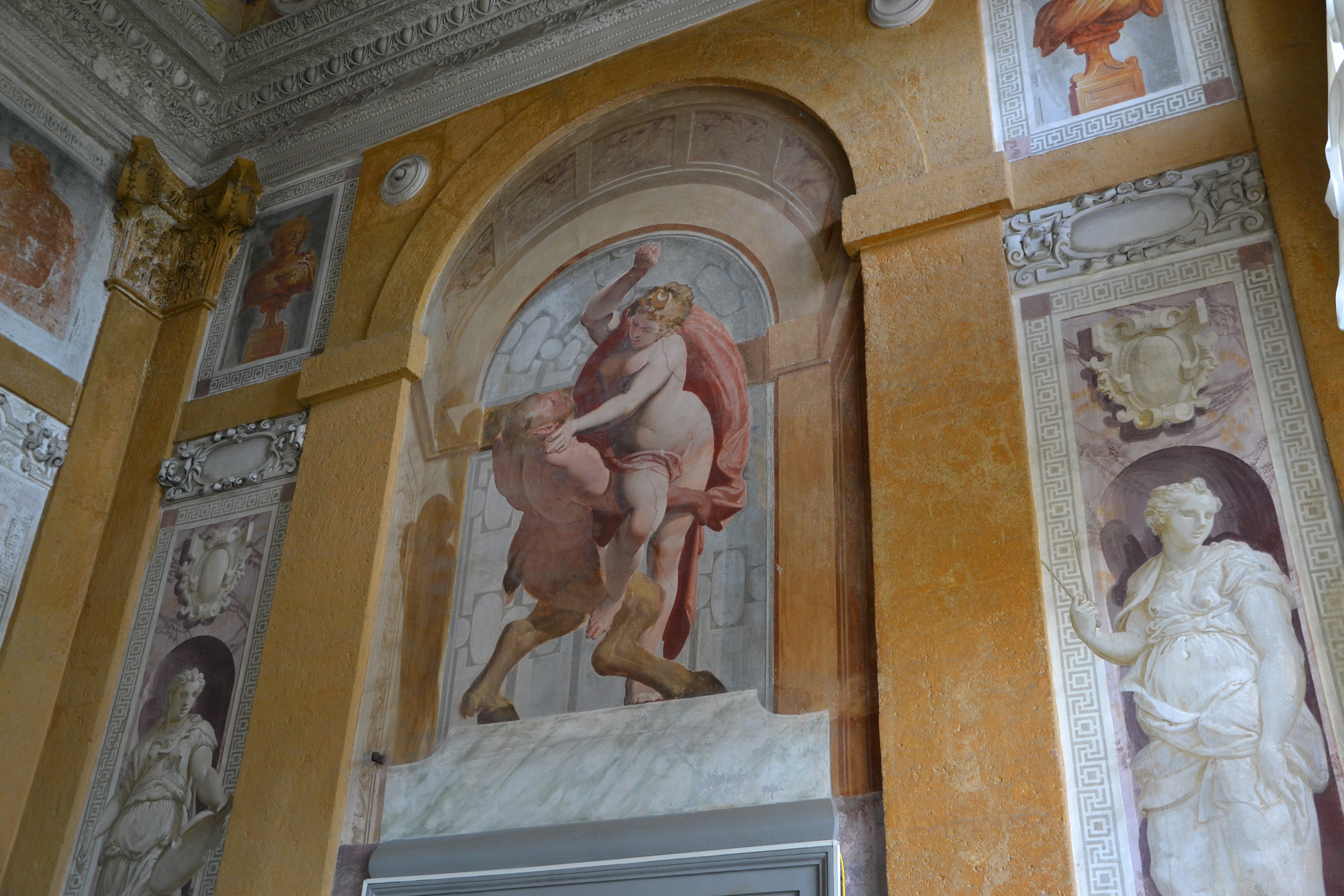
Villa Pallavicino delle Peschiere, interior

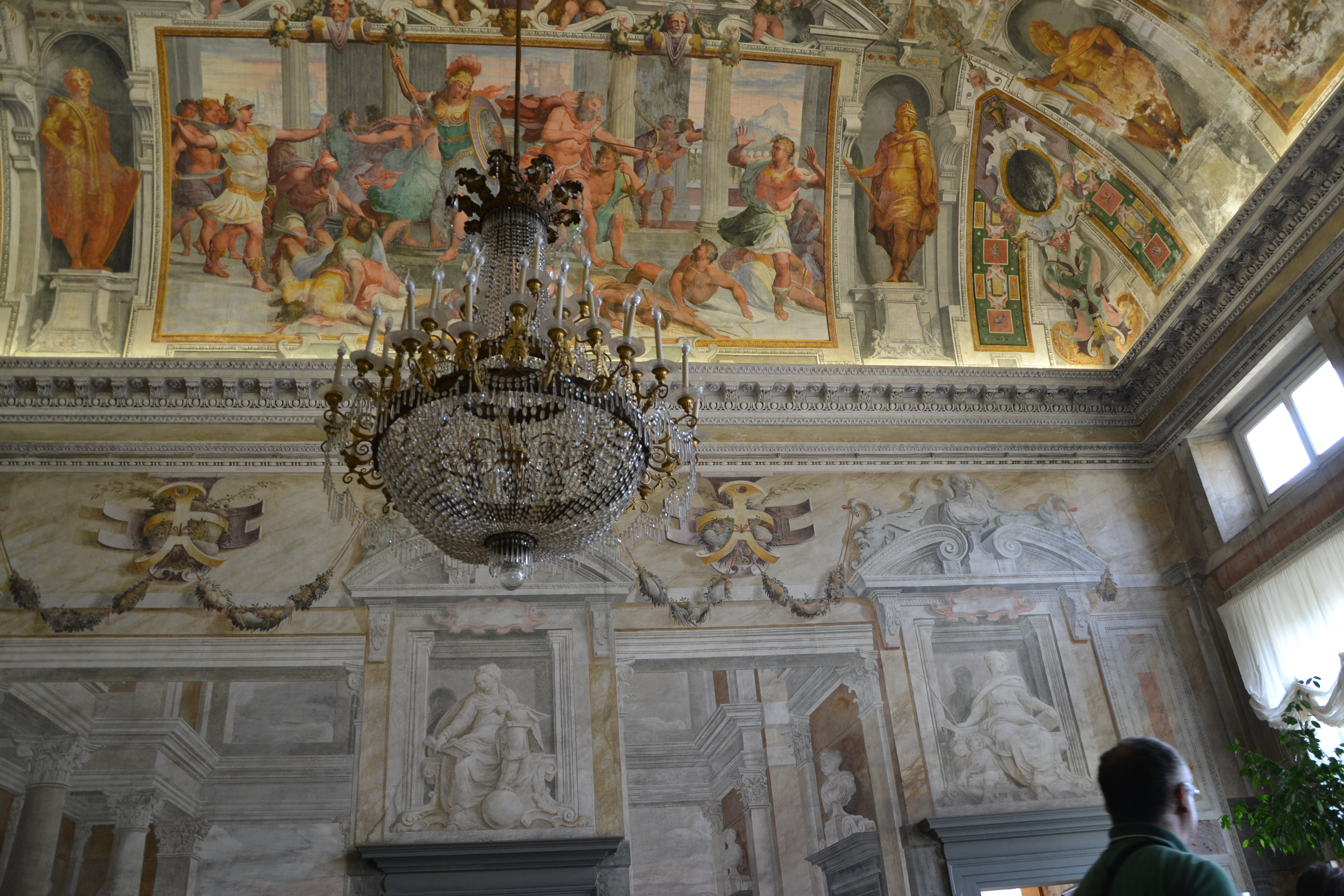
Villa Pallavicino delle Peschiere, interior

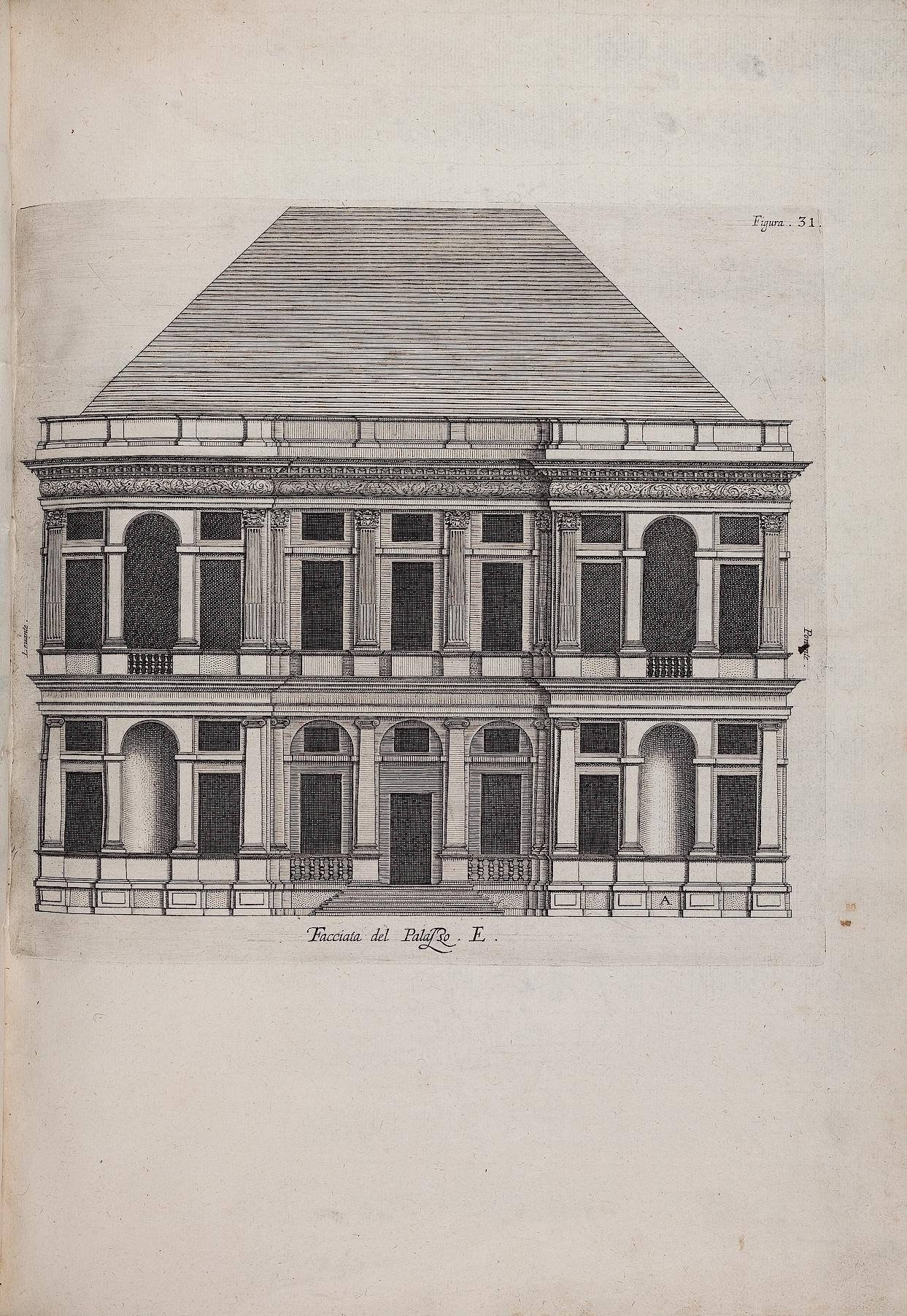

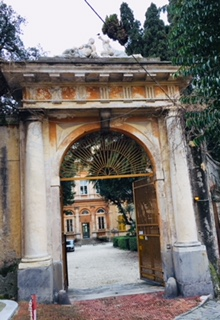
Villa delle Peschiere, portal

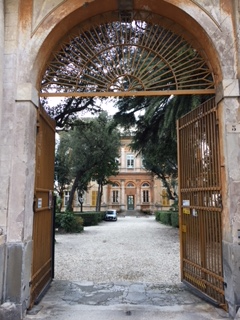
Villa delle Peschiere, portal

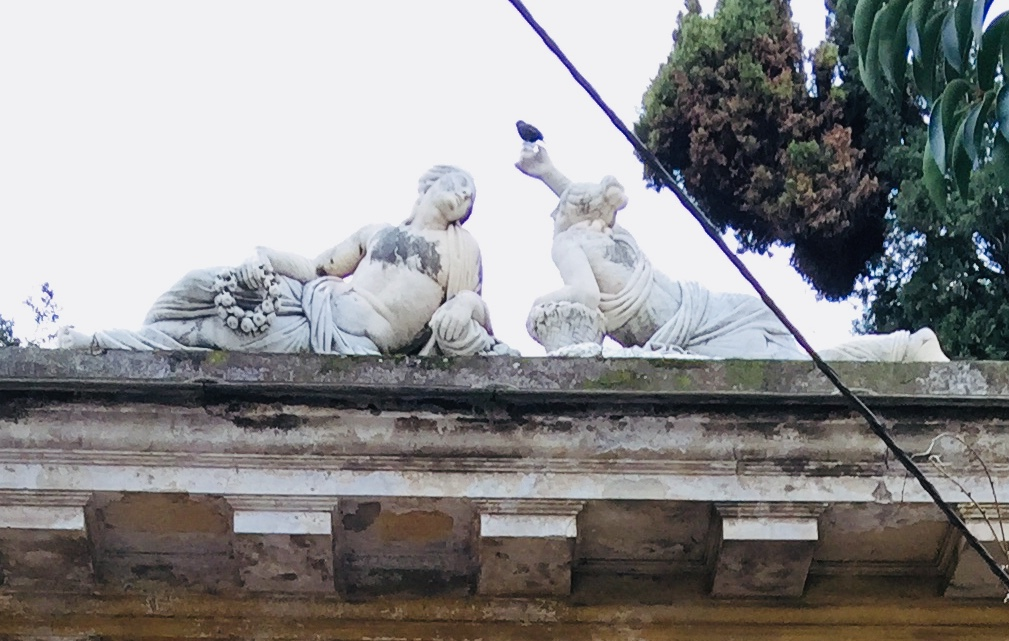
Villa delle Peschiere, portal
