= Villa Cattaneo dell'Olmo =

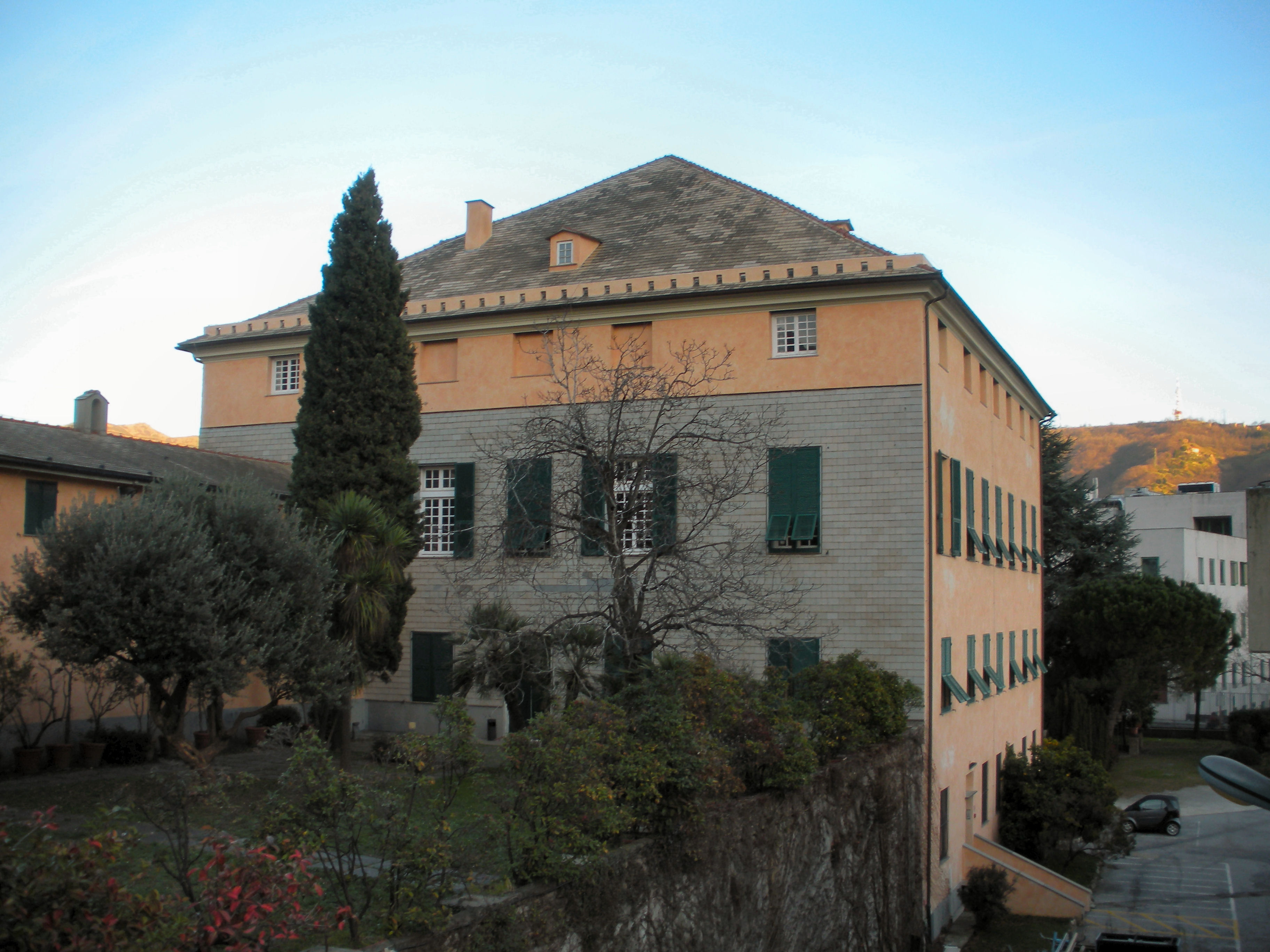
- Interactive map of the Villa Cattaneo dell'Olmo area
- Alternative names: Villa dell'Olmo, Villa Cattaneo Delle Piane dell'Olmo

General information
- Location: Corso Ferdinando Maria Perrone, 118, Genova
- Coordinates: 44.4357°N 8.8859°E
- Estimated completion: 17th century
- Owner: Cattaneo; Ansaldo Foundation

Villa Cattaneo, also known as Villa dell'Olmo or Villa Cattaneo Delle Piane dell'Olmo, is a historical aristocratic villa in the Cornigliano Campi neighborhood in Genoa, Italy.

== History ==
The "dell'Olmo" (Italian for "of the elm") settlement in Cornigliano Campi, adjacent to the fourteenth-century Abbey of San Niccolò del Boschetto, belonged to the Grimaldi family from the 15th century. After several ownership changes, the Cattaneo family, heirs of the Grimaldi, rebuilt the building as a suburban manor in the 17th century.

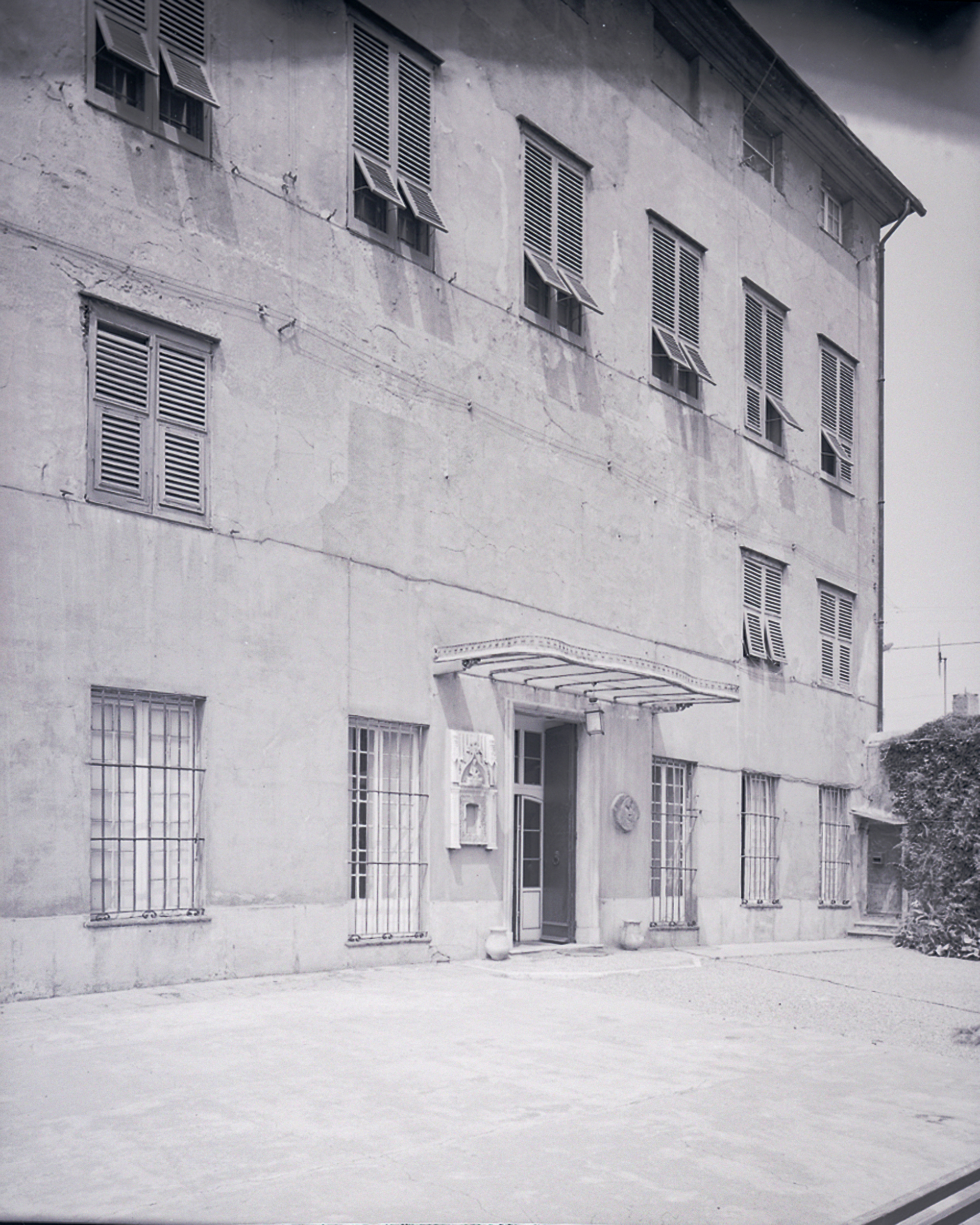
Main facade, Paolo Monti (1963)

In 1978, the villa was purchased by the industrial group Ansaldo, which already owned most of the surrounding lands, previously agricultural but later converted into an industrial site. Following the restoration of the interior and the reinforcement of the floors, using techniques that preserved the original frescoed vaults, the villa became the headquarters of the Ansaldo Historical Archive, now known as the Ansaldo Foundation

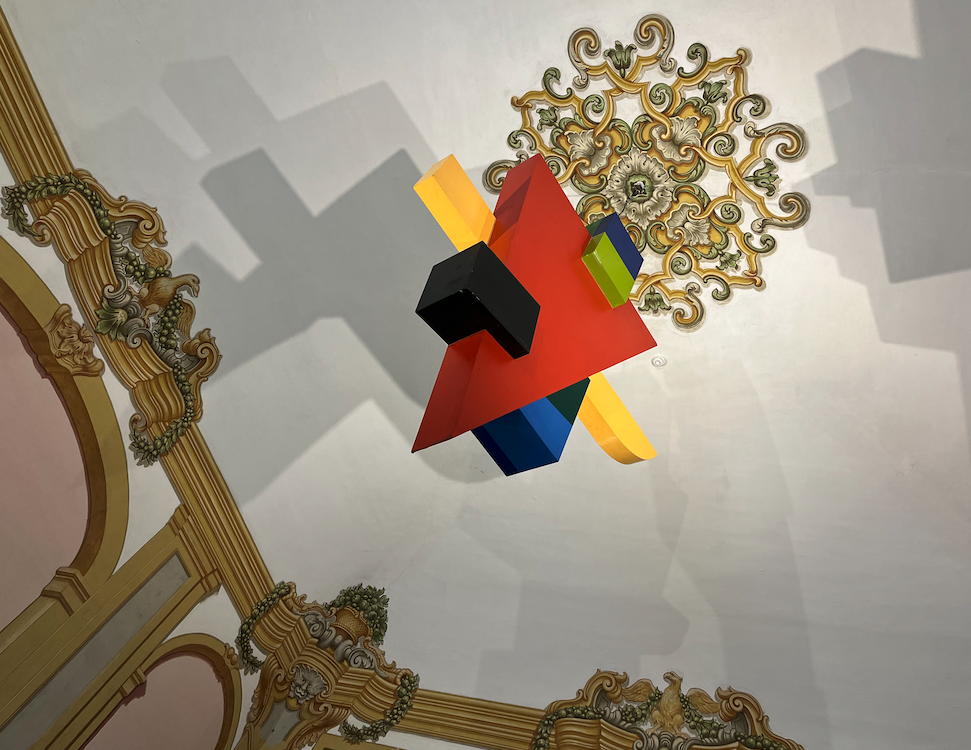
Rino Valido, "L'Equilibrio", and Giacomo Antonio Boni's frescoes in the atrium of villa Cattaneo dell'Olmo

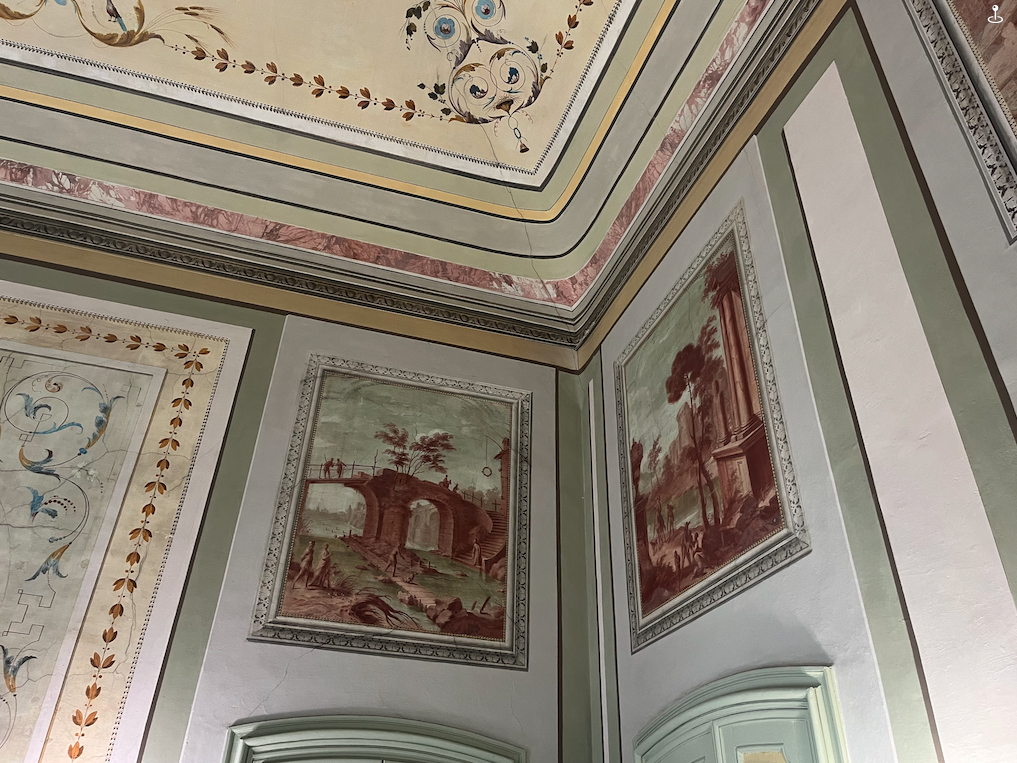
Giacomo Antonio Boni, frescoes of the main floor, villa Cattaneo dell'Olmo

Today, the villa is open to the public and hosts activities for the acquisition, conservation, digitization and enhancement of the historical archives of the present and former affiliates to the Ansaldo Group (now Leonardo), as well as cultural and artistic events and exhibitions.

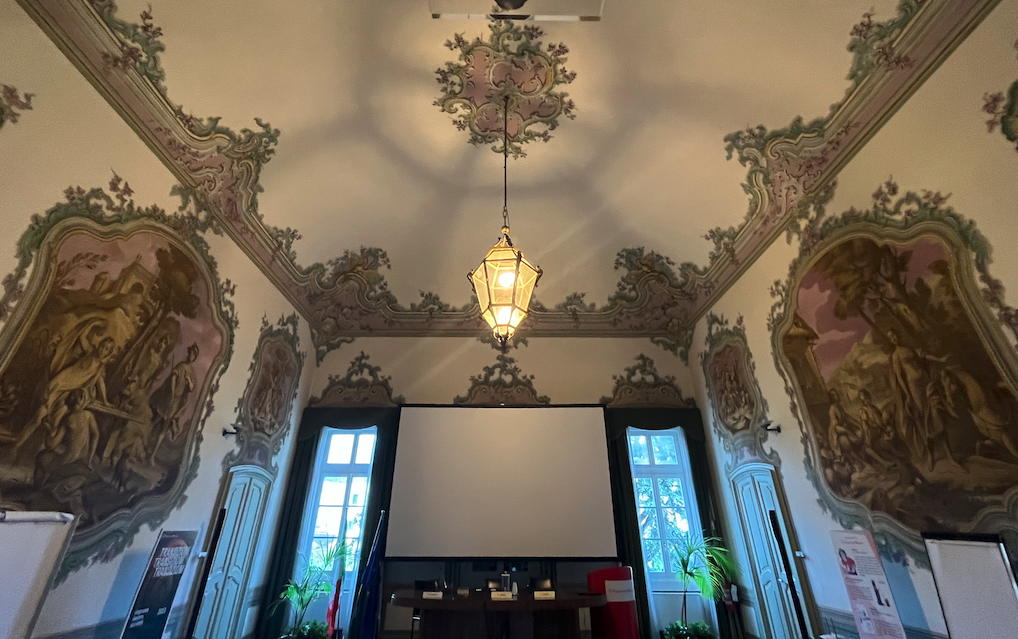
Giacomo Antonio Boni, frescoes of the main floor, villa Cattaneo dell'Olmo

== Description ==
The structure and layout of the villa are inspired by the Galeazzo Alessi's compositional model typical of the style of many Genoese palaces and villas, characterized by simple cubic lines and proportions, also recognizable in the Palazzi dei Rolli in Strada Nuova and the suburban villas in Sampierdarena. The internal layout keeps the collective areas, including the chapel on the first floor, separate from the private rooms and the ballroom on the main floor.

The decorations of the interior, committed to Giacomo Antonio Boni and his workshop in the mid-18th century, subdivides the internal spaces through the use of trompe-l'oeil techniques in the atrium and the main staircase, culminating in the Arcadian and mythological frescoes in the ballroom. The later neoclassical decoration of the noble floor rooms and the chapel, dating to the end of the century, integrates harmoniously with the previous pictorial cycle.

The frescoes in the ground floor lounges, added in the 19th century after a change of ownership, represent the last decorative contribution to the villa, along with a new visual arrangement of the surrounding park, including the still-existing tree-lined avenue.

== See also ==
- Villas of Genoa
- Giacomo Antonio Boni
- Cattaneo (family)
- Grimaldi (family)
- Republic of Genoa
- Gio. Ansaldo & C.

== Bibliography ==
- De Negri, Emmina, Cesare Fera, Luciano Grossi Bianchi e Ennio Poleggi. Catalogo delle Ville Genovesi (Genova: Italia Nostra, 1967).
