= Giardino botanico Clelia Durazzo Grimaldi =

Botanical garden in Italy

Coordinates: 44°25′50″N 8°49′01″E

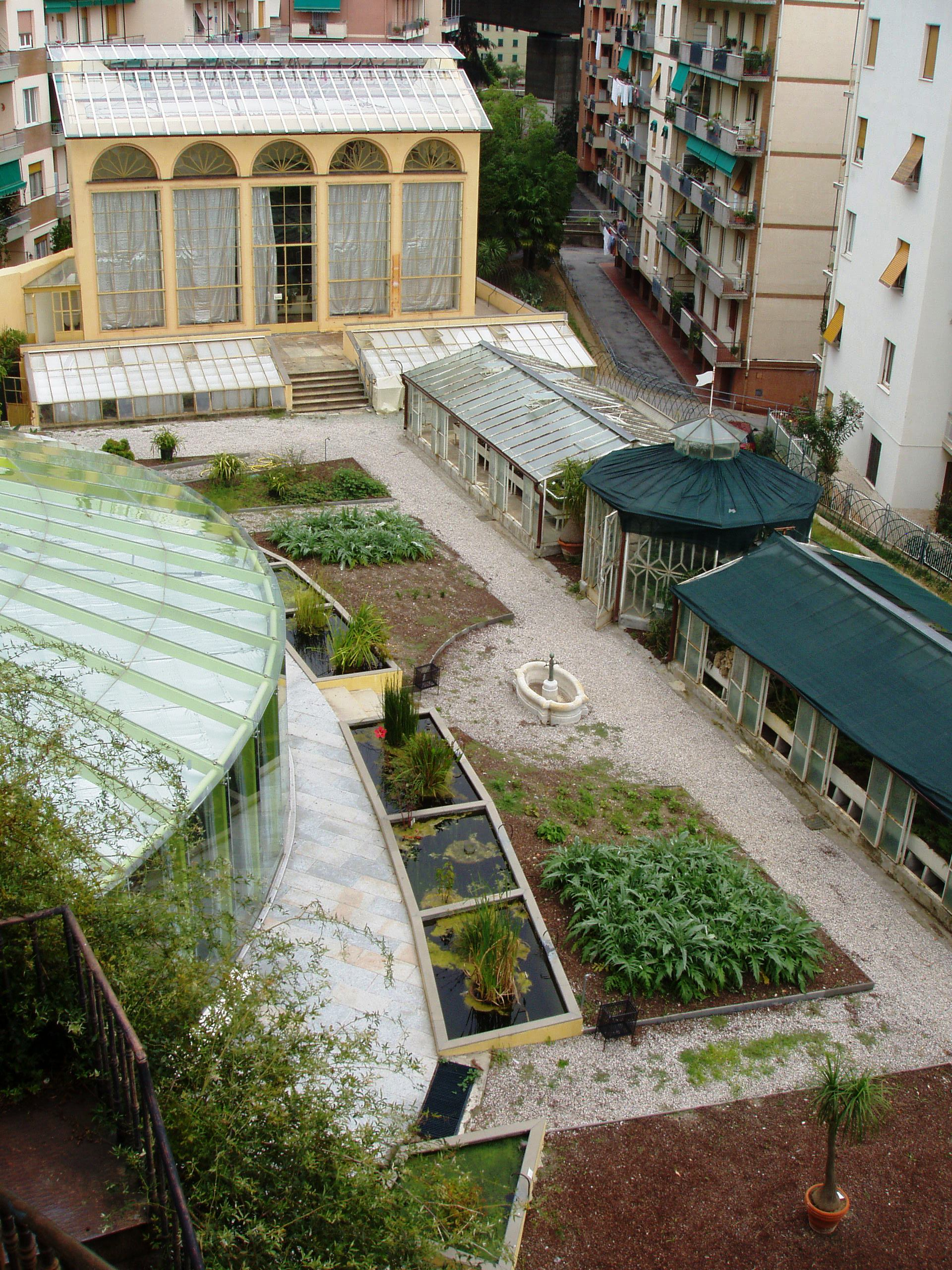
- Greenhouses
- Interactive map of Giardino botanico Clelia Durazzo Grimaldi
- Type: Botanical
- Location: Pegli (Genoa, Italy)
- Opened: 1794
- Owner: Municipality of Genoa
- Website: www.urbancenter.comune.genova.it/node/1101

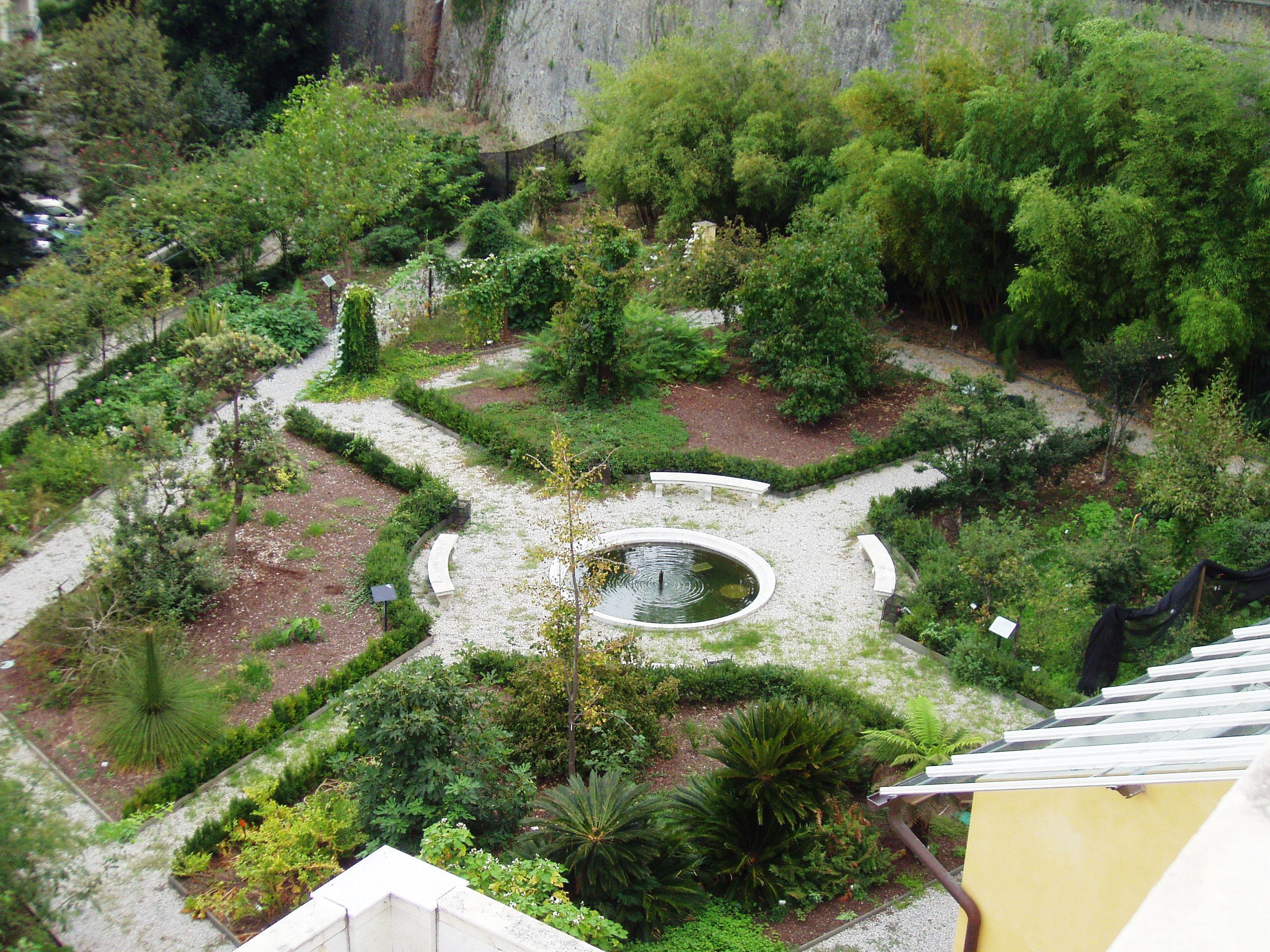
Gardens

The Giardino botanico Clelia Durazzo Grimaldi is a small botanical garden located on the grounds of the Villa Durazzo-Pallavicini in Pegli, a suburb of Genoa, Italy. It is a part of the romantic historical park made by Ignazio Pallavicini in 1846.

The garden was established in 1794 by Clelia Durazzo Grimaldi, and donated to the city in 1928. Today is restored and it contains around twenty groups of plants laid on the ground by an educational disposition:

- Carnivorous plants
- Succulent plants
- Tropical plants and orchids
- Palms
- Ferns
- Camellias
- Roses
- Bamboo
- Aquatic plants
- Mediterranean plants
- Scented plants
- Useful plants

The garden contains a lot of species, some of these rare or unusual.

== See also ==
- List of botanical gardens in Italy

== External links and references ==
- Il giardino botanico Clelia Durazzo Grimaldi (in Italian) from the Istituto Tecnologie Didattiche website.
- Convention on Biological Diversity — Botanic Gardens in Italy
