= Clelia Durazzo Grimaldi =

Italian botanist and aristocrat (1760–1830)

- Born: 1760
- Died: 1830 (aged 69–70)
- Known for: Herbarium and botanical garden
- Scientific career
- Fields: Botany

Clelia Durazzo Grimaldi (1760–1830), also known as Clelia Durazzo, was a botanist and marchesa in Genoa, Italy.

== Early life ==
She was the daughter of Giacomo Filippo Durazzo and his wife, Maddalena Pallavicini. Her father was a member of one of the most illustrious and aristocratic Genoese families, as well as a notable naturalist and bibliophile in his own right. Durazzo was introduced to the study of botany by her uncle Ignazio Durazzo, who had founded several gardens in town, as well as in his villas in the countryside.

== Biography ==
After her marriage to Giuseppe Grimaldi, member of the House of Grimaldi, she dedicated herself to the study of botany, and in 1794 established a private botanical garden, the Giardino botanico Clelia Durazzo Grimaldi on the grounds of her residence, the Villa Durazzo-Pallavicini. She also collected some 5,000 plant specimens in a herbarium, subsequently donated to the Civico Museo Doria di Storia Naturale di Genova.

== Notes and references ==
=== Further reading ===
- Angela Valenti Durazzo, I Durazzo da schiavi a dogi della Repubblica di Genova, Genoa 2004.
- Luca Leoncini, Da tintoretto a Rubens. Capolavori della Collezione Durazzo, Skira, Genoa 2004.
