= Bartolomeo Bianco =

Italian architect

Bartolomeo Bianco (1590–1657) was an Italian architect of the early Baroque.

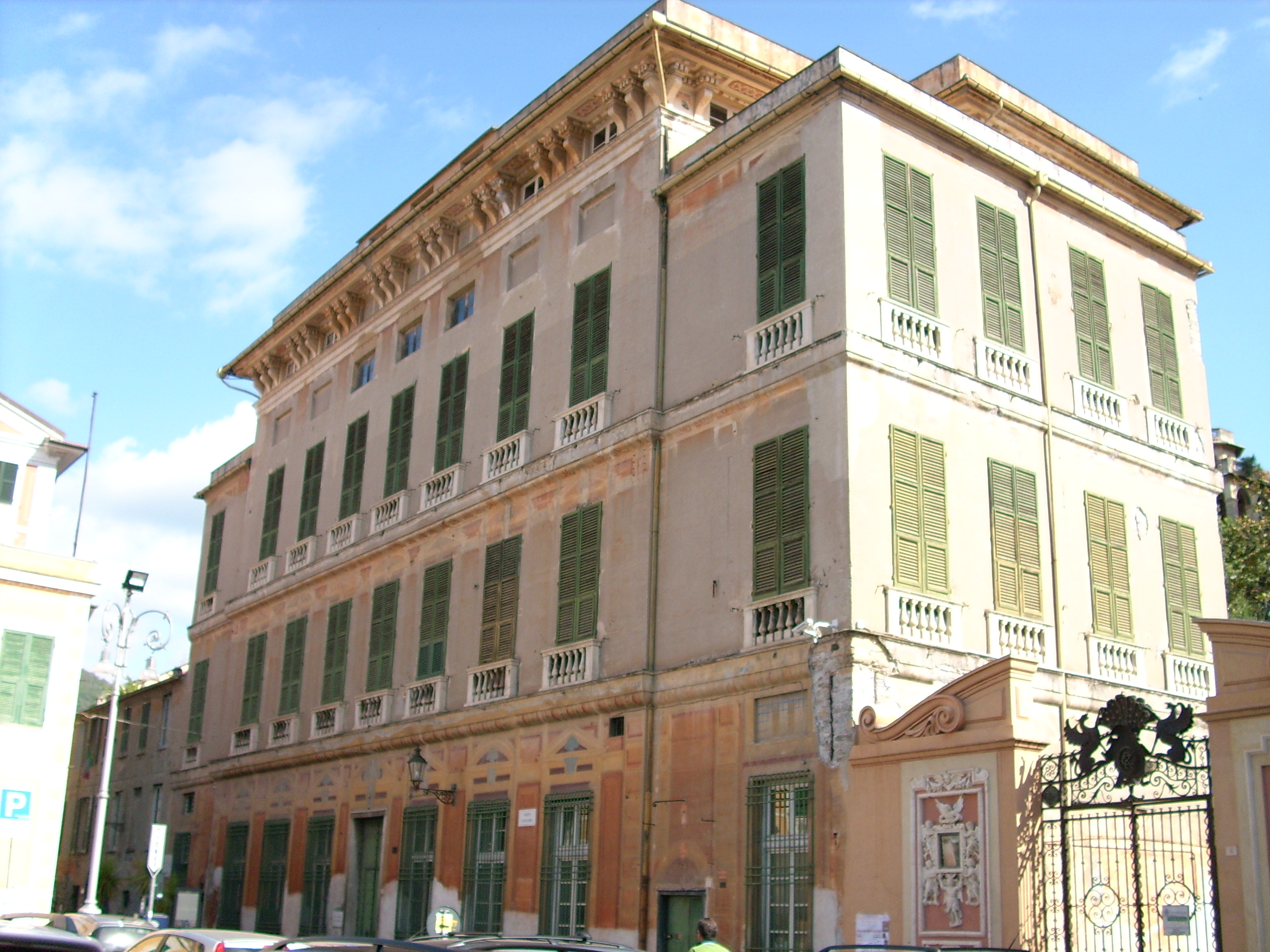
Palazzo Rocca at Chiavari

Born at Como, he was the designer of several palaces in Genoa, where he moved to follow his father, also an architect. His works include the building which is now the centerpiece of the University of Genoa, the Palazzo Balbi at Campomorone and the Palazzo Rocca at Chiavari.

He died in the second year of the two-year plague outbreak that halved the population of the city.

== See also ==
- Luigi Baccio del Bianco (contemporary painter and architect conflated with Bartolomeo Bianco)
