= Martin-Pierre Gauthier =

French architect

- Born: January 9, 1790; Troyes, France
- Died: May 19, 1855 (aged 65); Paris, France

Martin-Pierre Gauthier (French: [maʁtɛ̃ pjɛʁ ɡotje]; 1790–1855) was a French architect.

== Biography ==
A student of Charles Percier, he won the Grand Prix de Rome in 1810 with a design for a Christian basilica. He resided at the Villa Medici from 1811 to 1814.

Upon his return to Paris, he served as architect for the Paris hospices and Louvre Palace. He taught at the École polytechnique, where he succeeded Durand in 1834. He was elected a member of the Academy of Fine Arts in 1842 and appointed a Knight of the Legion of Honor in 1844.

The city of Troyes, satisfied with his previous work, commissioned Gauthier to rebuild the Saint-Nicolas hospice. He drew up the plans but did not supervise the construction site. The contractors engaged in a series of frauds and shoddy workmanship and were sued, along with the architect, by the authorities. Gauthier was ordered to pay 200,000 francs. Unable to pay, he was imprisoned in Clichy, Hauts-de-Seine. Following an intervention by the Institute, Napoleon III promised to forgive his debt. However, Gauthier died in prison before he could benefit from this gesture.
