= Galeazzo Alessi =

Italian architect

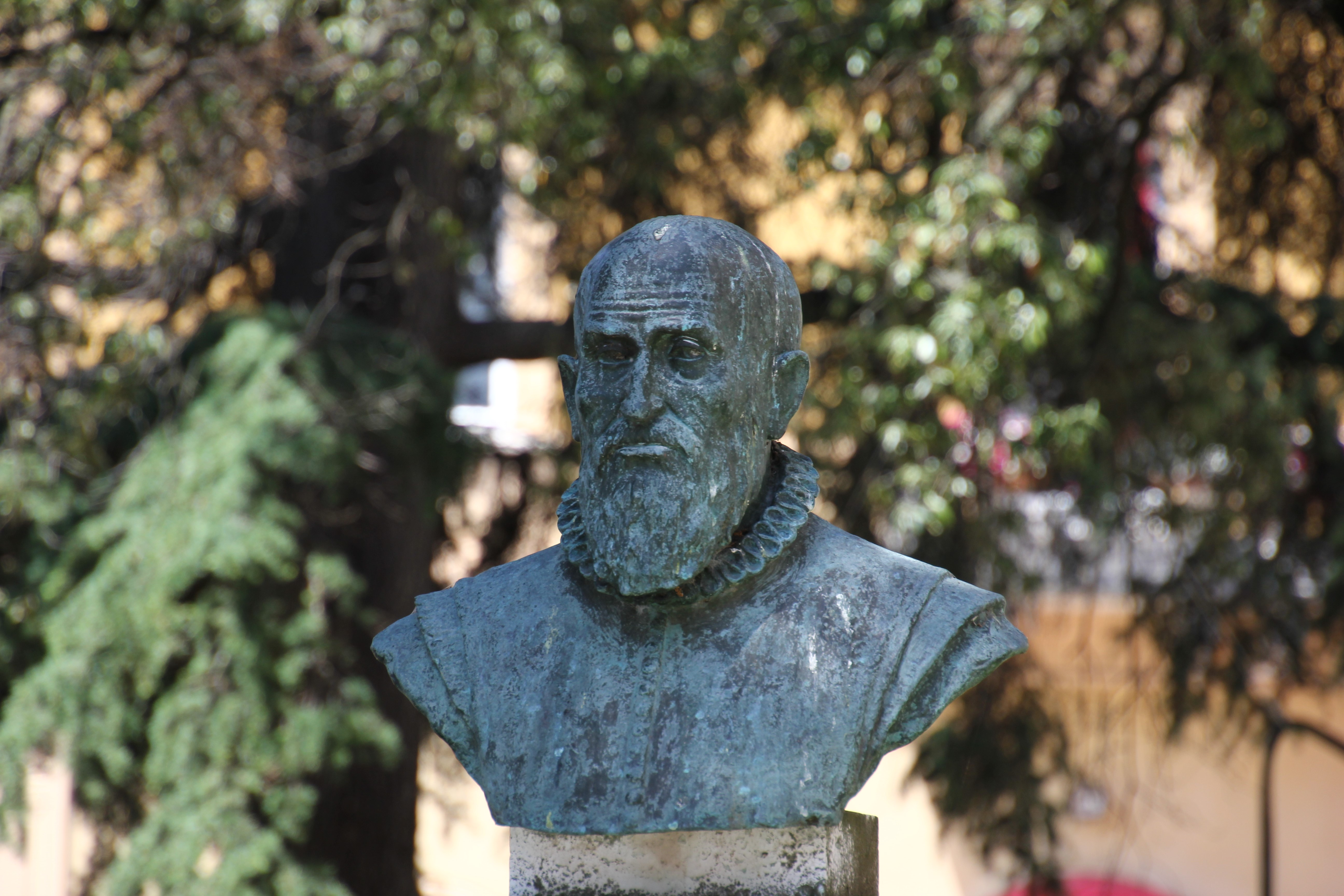
- Born: 1512; Perugia
- Died: 30 December 1572 (aged 59–60); Perugia
- Occupation: Architect
- Years active: 1536-1572

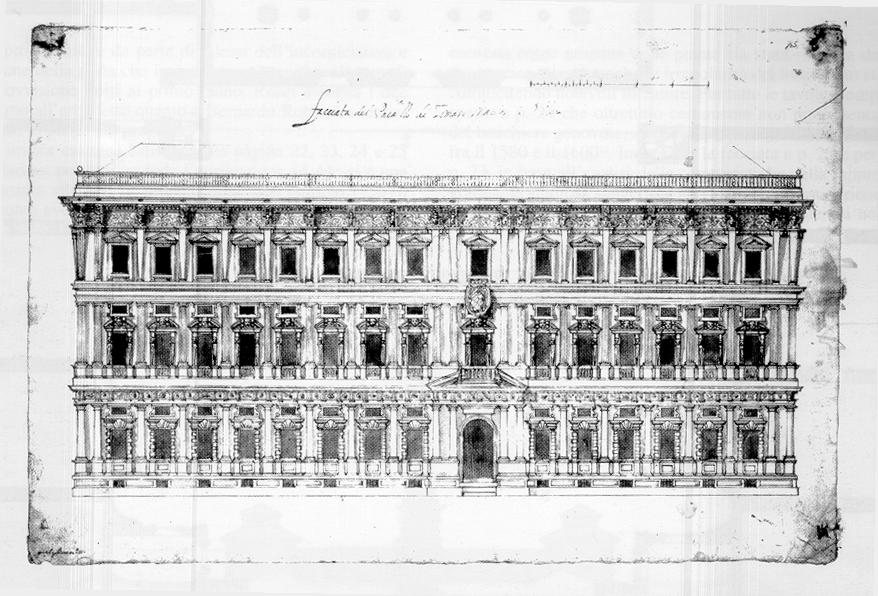
Alessi's original project for the façade of Palazzo Marino, Milan, altered in the execution

Galeazzo Alessi (1512 – 30 December 1572) was an Italian architect from Perugia, known throughout Europe for his distinctive style based on his enthusiasm for ancient architecture. He studied drawing for civil and military architecture under the direction of Giovanni Battista Caporali.

For a number of years he lived in Genoa. He was involved in the lay-out of the streets and the restoration of the city walls, as well as being responsible for many of its impressive palazzi, now a part of the World Heritage List. Alessi displayed particular aptitude for organizing compositions on sloping sites.

- Saint-Georges Church, Périgueux, France His work can be found in many other Italian cities, including in Ferrara, Bologna, Naples and Milan, where he designed the facade of Santa Maria presso San Celso. With Vignola, he designed the Basilica of Santa Maria degli Angeli in Assisi, the seventh largest Christian church at the time. Elsewhere in Europe, he designed churches and palaces in France, Germany and Flanders. He produced designs for El Escorial in Spain, but age and health prevented him from carrying them out.

== Selected works ==
=== Perugia ===
- Rocca Paolina, remodelling
- Loggia at the Oratorio di S. Angelo della Pace
- S. Maria del Popolo (Camera di Commercio)
- Loggia for the Palazzo dei Priori, remodelling
- Convent of Santa Giuliana (S. Caterina)
- Portale of the Villa del Leone
- Doorway in the southern flank of the Duomo
- Works for San Pietro

=== Assisi ===
- Basilica of Santa Maria degli Angeli
- Tabernacle of San Francesco (original design in the Metropolitan Museum of Art)
- Works in the Cathedral of San Rufino

=== Genoa ===
- Villa Giustiniani-Cambiaso, Albaro
- Basilica of S. Maria Assunta, Carignano
- Porta del Molo (Porta Siberia), inserted in the city walls
- Cupola of St. Lawrence Cathedral
- Villa delle Peschiere
- Villa Grimaldi-Sauli in Bisagno
- Proposals for the palazzi in the Strada Nuova

=== Milan ===
- Palazzo Marino (Municipio di Milano), for the Genoese Tommaso Marino.
- San Barnaba
- Auditorium of the Scuole Canobiane
- Santa Maria presso San Celso
- San Raffaele
- Various projects in the Duomo di Milano, including the monument of the Arcimboldi.

=== Sacro Monte di Varallo (Vercelli) ===
- City plan

=== Rome ===
- Unexecuted designs for the Church of the Gesù
