= Villa Gropallo dello Zerbino =

Villa Gropallo "Dello Zerbino"
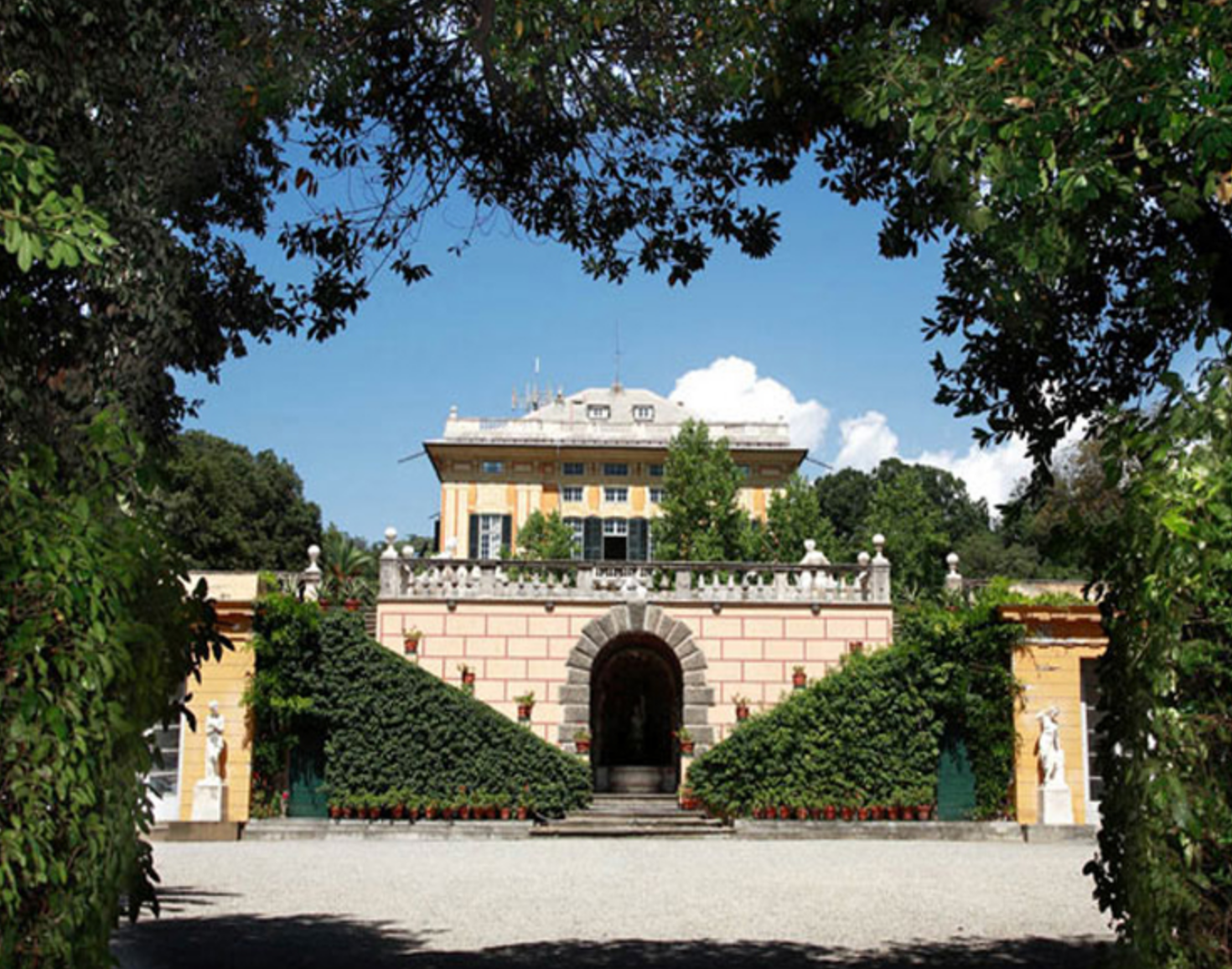
- Villa Gropallo dello Zerbino
- Interactive map of the Villa Gropallo "Dello Zerbino" area

General information
- Status: In use
- Type: Villa
- Architectural style: Manierisme
- Location: Passo dello Zerbino, 1, Genoa, Italy
- Coordinates: 44.4128773°N 8.9473737°E
- Construction started: 16th century
- Client: Balbi family (16th century); Durazzo family (18th century); Gropallo (19th century)
- Owner: Cesare and Marcello Castelbarco Albani

Villa Balbi Durazzo Gropallo "Dello Zerbino" is a 16th-century villa in Genoa, Italy. It is situated in the quarter of Castelletto, near Galeazzo Alessi's Villa delle Peschiere. It was constructed from 1599 to 1603 as a suburban villa for the Genoese noblemen Stefano Balbi, ambassador to Milan, and Giovanni Battista Balbi. The name Zerbino is derived from the Ligurian word zerbo, meaning "uncultivated"— at the time when the villa was built, the surrounding area was still outside of the city walls and uncultivated. In the 18th century it passed to Marcello III Durazzo, then to the Gropallo family. It is now owned by the Castelbarco Albani family and used as a venue for events and exhibitions.

== History ==
The villa was built from 1599 to 1603 as summer house for the Genoese noblemen Stefano Balbi, ambassador to Milan, e Giovanni Battista Balbi. In In the 18th century it passed to Marcello III Durazzo and. at the beginning of the 19th century, the Durazzo family commissioned to the architect Emanuele Andrea Tagliafichi the enlargement and landscaping of the garden. In the second half of the 19th century, the villa remained untouched by the urban expansion of the city, which surrounded it without compromising the unity of the monumental site. At the end of the century the villa passed to the Gropallo until the last descendant of the family, the marquess Laura Gropallo della Sforzesca left it in 1995 to her two sons Cesare e Marcello Castelbarco Albani. The villa is now used as a venue for meetings, events and exhibitions.

== Description ==
=== Architecture ===
The architecture of the villa follows the traditional tri-partition of the façade, common in Genoa at the time under the influence of Galeazzo Alessi. Also the internal distribution is a typical one, centered around the main rooms.

=== Decoration ===
The internal decoration, still well preserved, includes the 17th century frescoes at the piano nobile by Domenico Piola and Gregorio De Ferrari, the latter credited with the most notable fresco in the central room, featuring Time and the Seasons. On the ground floor, renovated in the neoclassical style 18th century by Tagliafichi, there is a large room opened to the garden and decorated by Giovanni Barabino and Michele Canzio.

=== Garden ===
The park was remodeled at the beginning of the 19th century by Tagliafichi, with terraces, staircases, a nymphaeum and a romantic grotto. The nobleman Ippolito Durazzo, retired to private life after the fall of the Republic of Genoa in 1815, dedicated himself to the development of a botanical garden.

== Gallery ==
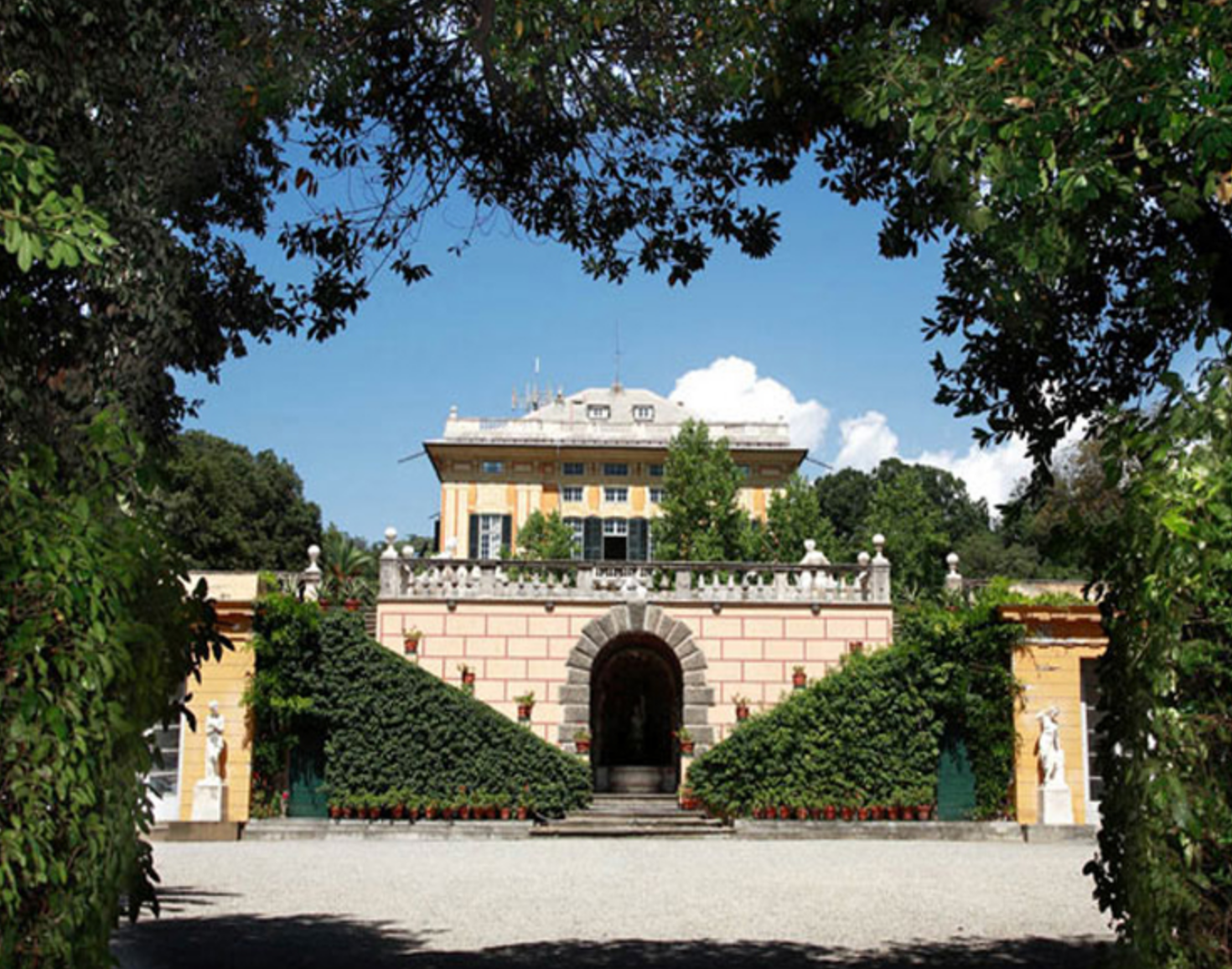
Villa Gropallo dello Zerbino, Genoa

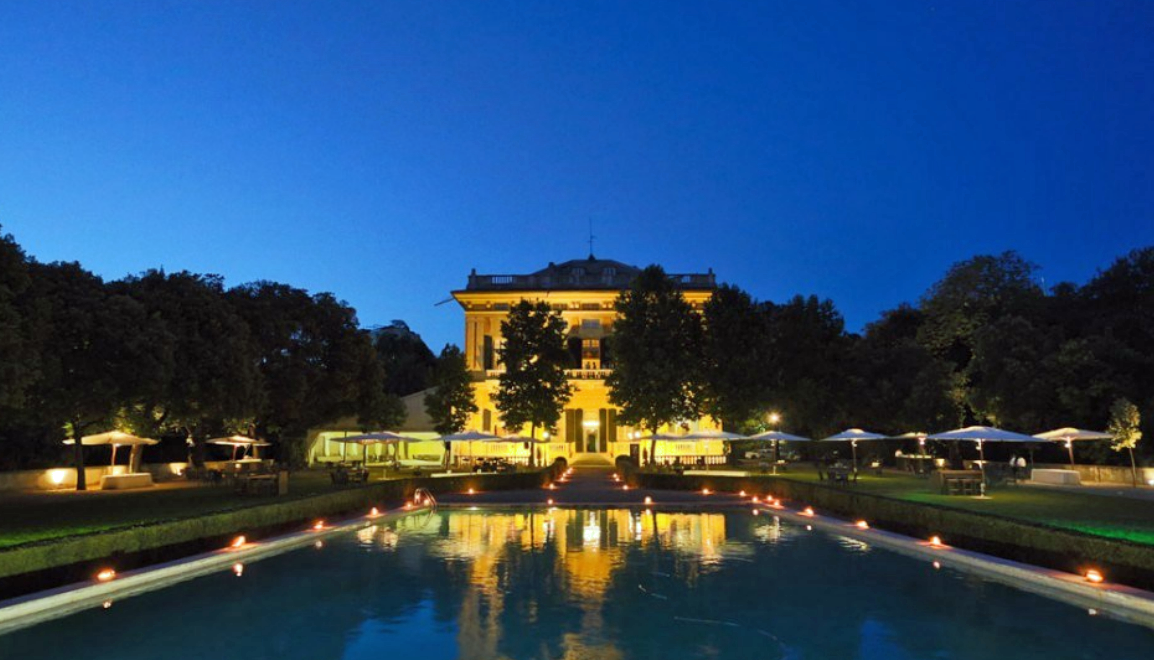
Villa Gropallo dello Zerbino, Genoa

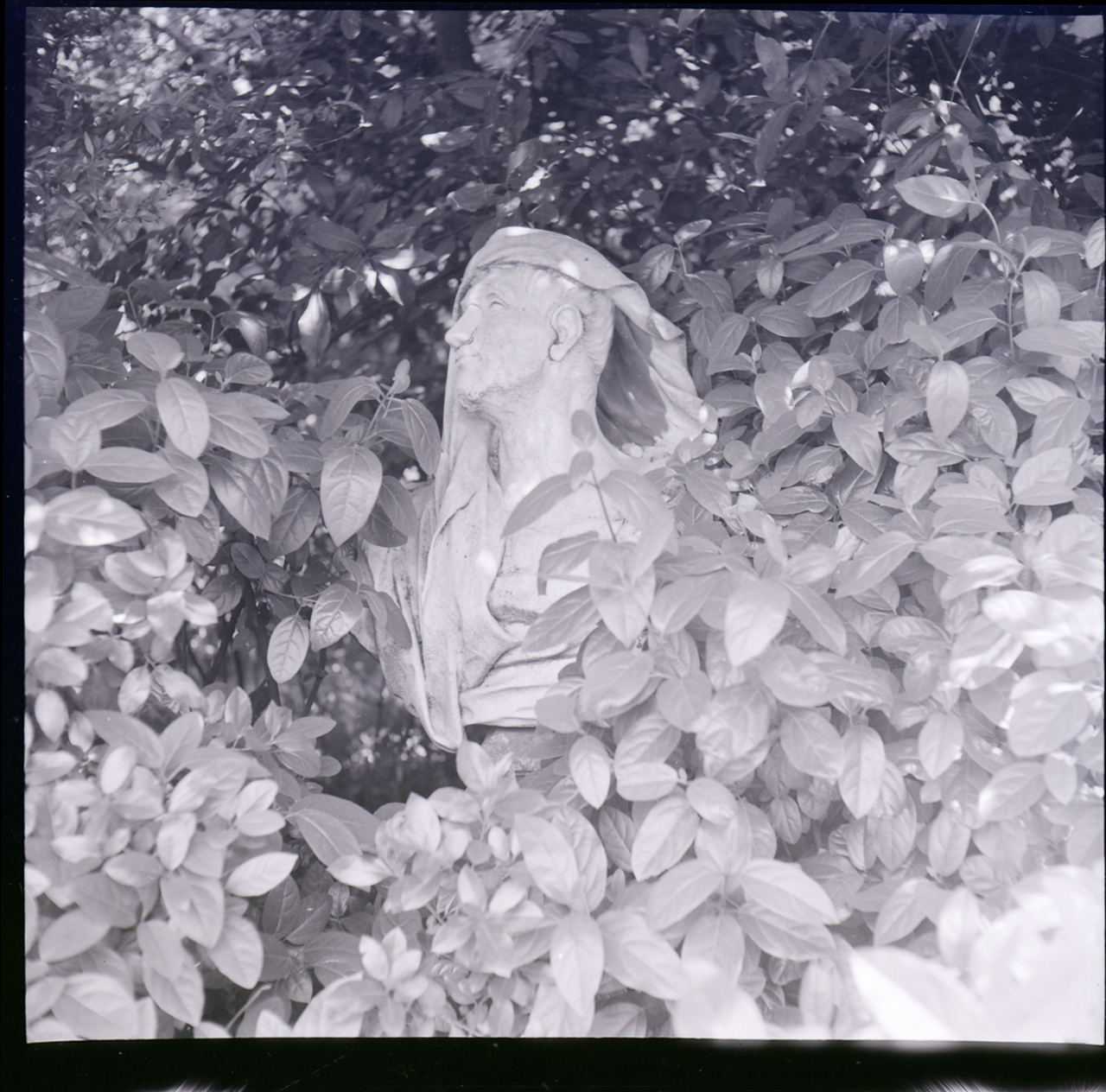
Villa Gropallo dello Zerbino, Genoa. Paolo Monti, servizio fotografico 1964

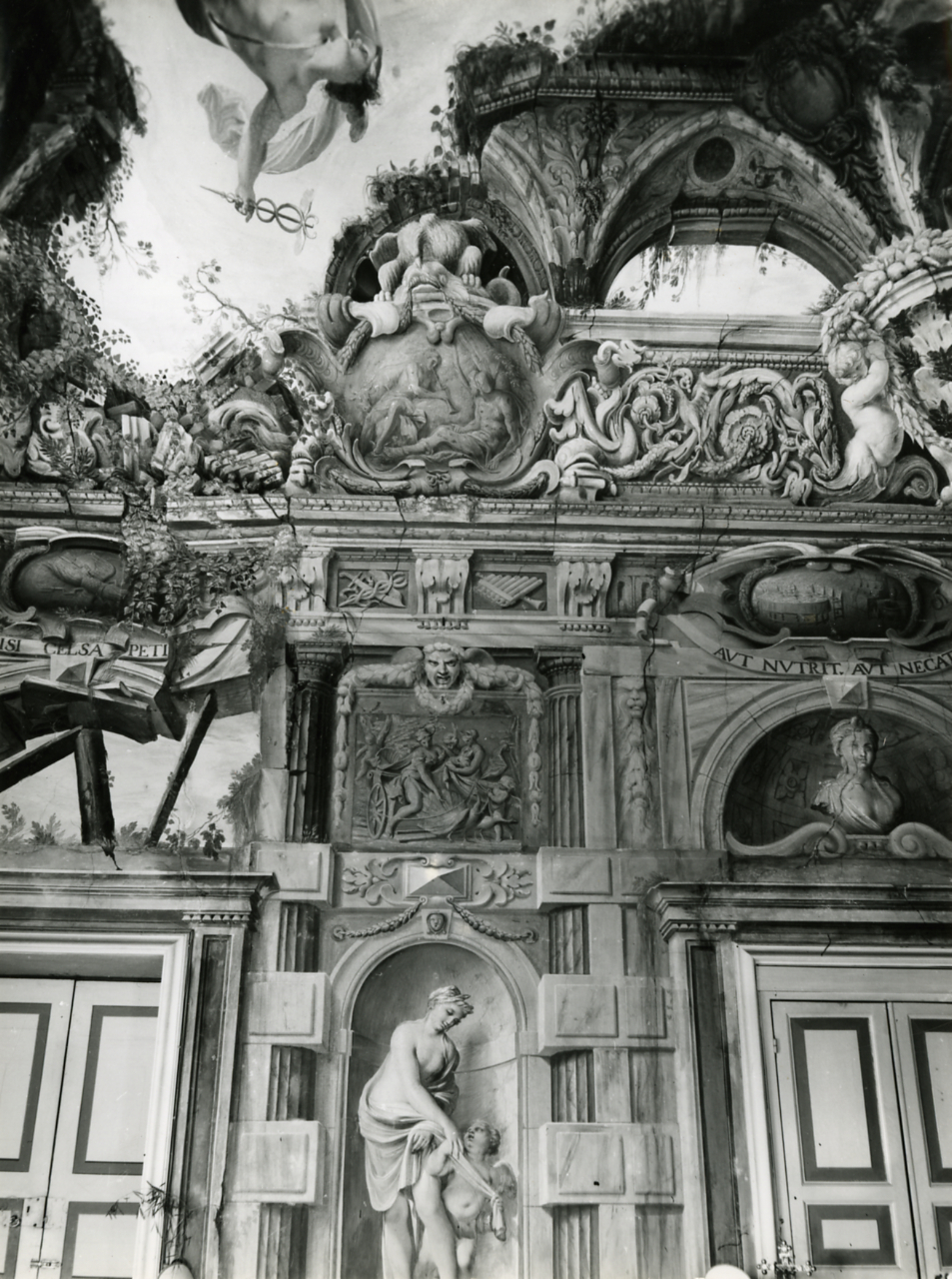
Villa Gropallo dello Zerbino, Genoa. Paolo Monti, servizio fotografico 1964

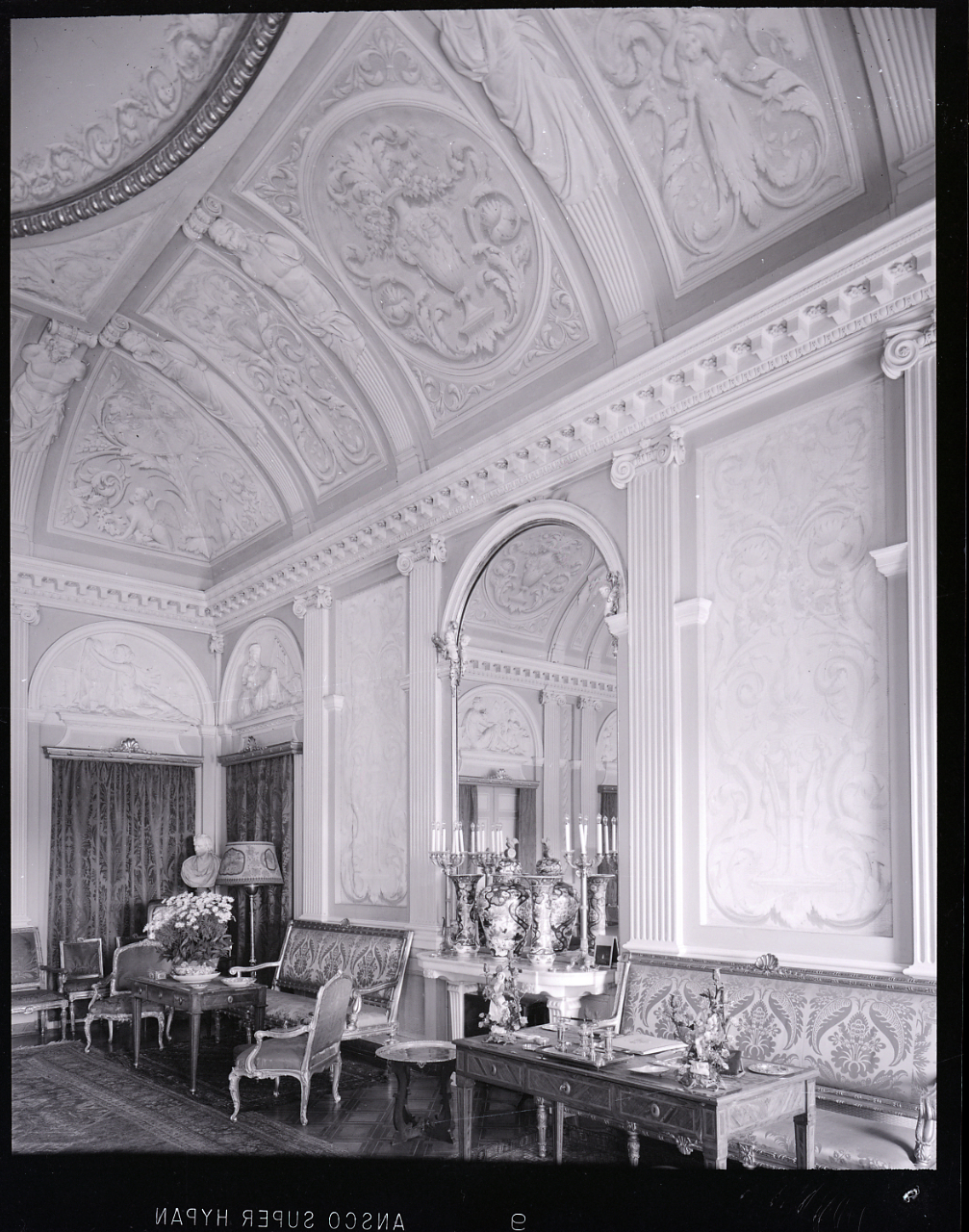
Villa Gropallo dello Zerbino, Genoa. Paolo Monti, servizio fotografico 1964

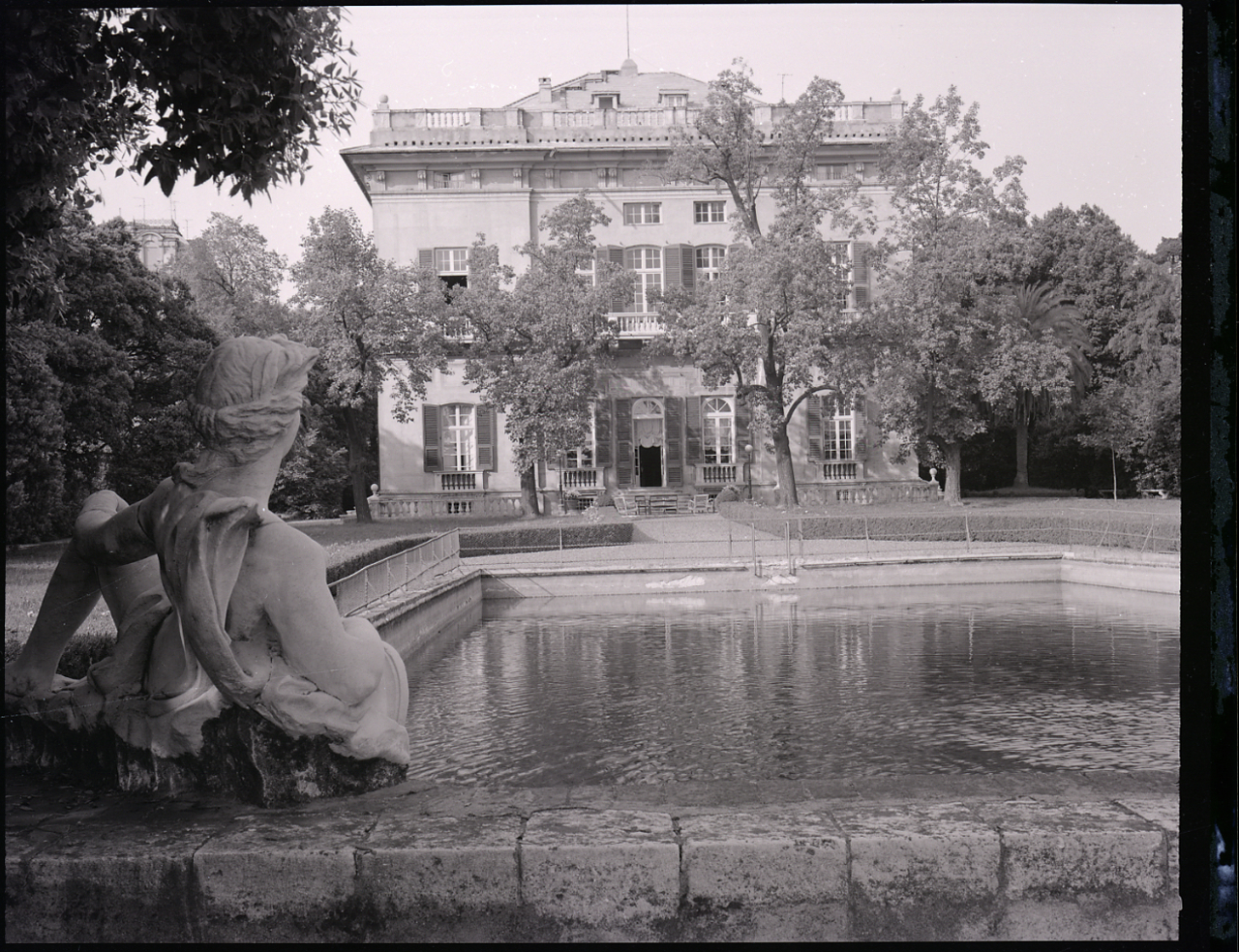
Villa Gropallo dello Zerbino, Genoa. Paolo Monti, servizio fotografico 1964

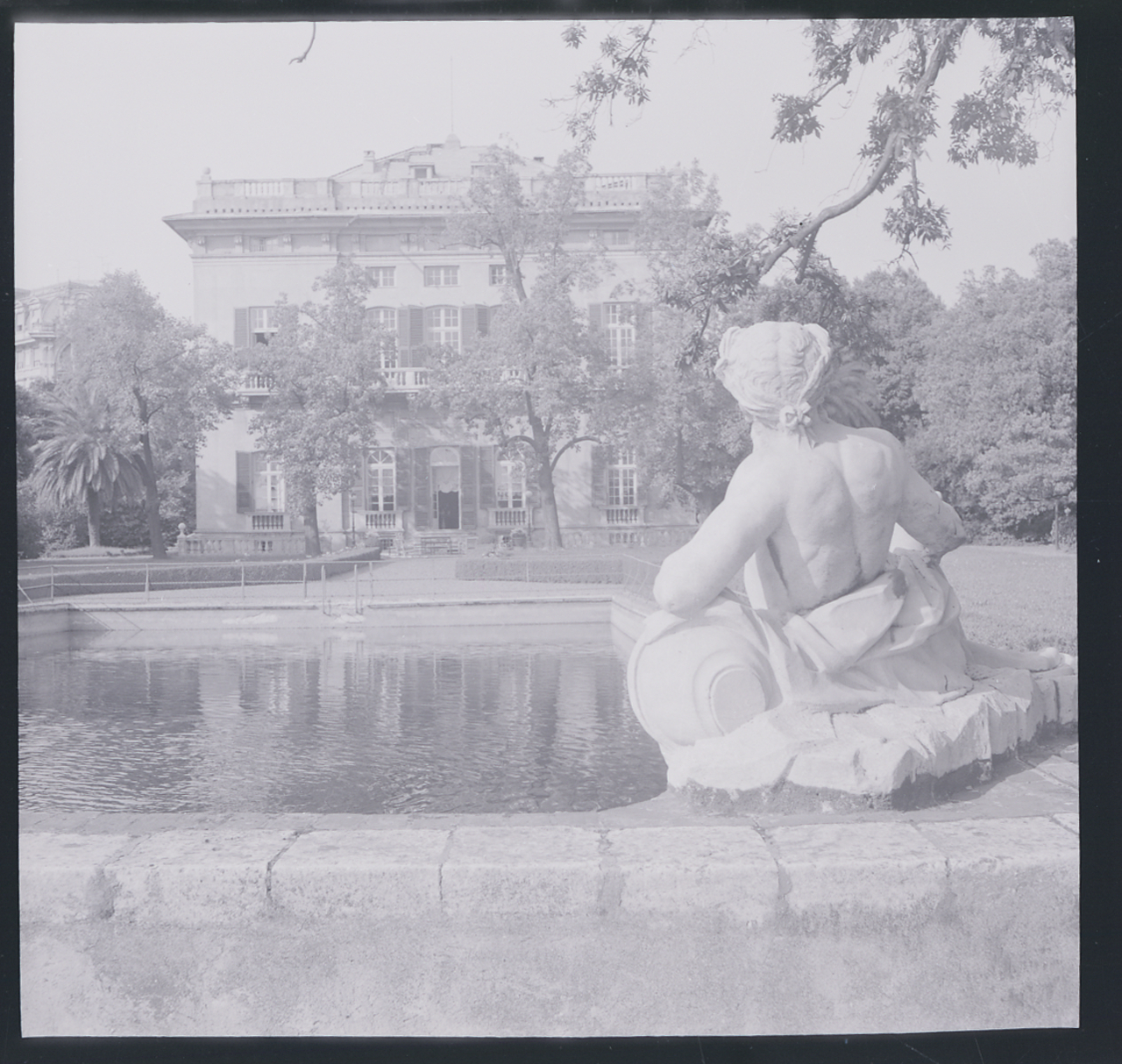
Villa Gropallo dello Zerbino, Genoa. Paolo Monti, servizio fotografico 1964

== See also ==
- Galeazzo Alessi
- Genoa
- Castelletto
- Villa delle Peschiere

== Bibliography ==
- Catalogo delle Ville Genovesi, Italia Nostra, Genova 1967, p. 118-131.
- Riccardo Luccardini, La Circonvallazione a Monte. Genova. Storia dell'espansione urbana dell'Ottocento, Genova, SAGEP, 2012, p. 52.
- Martin-Pierre Gauthier, Les plus beaux edifices de la ville de Genes, Paris, 1832, II, tav. 1-6.
- Guida d'Italia Liguria, Touring Club Italiano, 2009, p. 182.
