= Casteggio =

- Comune
- Comune di Casteggio
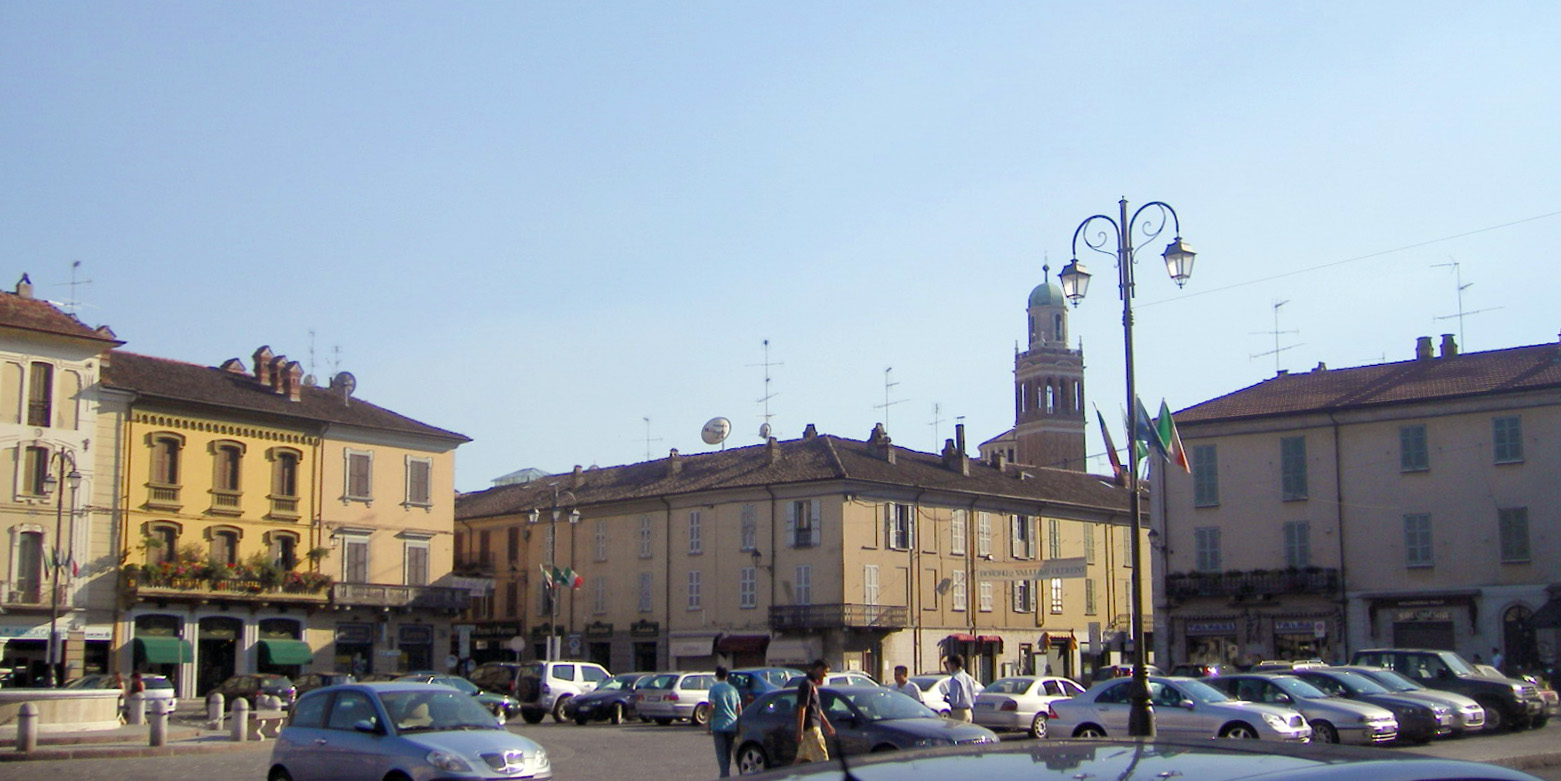

- Coat of arms

- Location within Italy Location within Lombardy
- Coordinates: 45°1′N 9°8′E
- Country: Italy
- Region: Lombardy
- Province: Pavia (PV)
- Frazioni: Cròtesi, Mairano, Rivetta, San Biagio, Sgarbina, Tronco Nero

Government
  - Mayor: Lorenzo Maria Vigo (since 2019-05-26) (The People of Freedom (PdL) – Lega Nord (centre-right))

Area
  - Total: 17.78 km^{2} (6.86 sq mi)
- Elevation: 90 m (300 ft)

Population (2005)
  - Total: 6,413
  - Density: 360.7/km^{2} (934.2/sq mi)
- Demonym: Casteggiani
- Time zone: UTC+1 (CET)
  - Summer (DST): UTC+2 (CEST)
- Postal code: 27045
- Dialing code: 0383
- Patron saint: St. Peter Martyr
- Saint day: Monday after Third Sunday in September
- Website: Official website

Casteggio is a comune (municipality) in the Province of Pavia in the Italian region Lombardy, located about 61 km (38 mi) south of Milan and about 25 km (16 mi) south of Pavia. As of 31 July 2010, it had a population of 6,537 and an area of 17.8 km^{2} (6.9 sq mi).

Casteggio borders the following municipalities: Borgo Priolo, Calvignano, Casatisma, Corvino San Quirico, Montebello della Battaglia, Oliva Gessi, Robecco Pavese, Verretto.

== History ==
Clastidium was a settlement of the Ligures, belonging to the tribe called Marici by the Romans (and wrongly identified as Celts by Polybius). The location was the site of a major defeat of the Marici by the legions of Marcus Claudius Marcellus, which was celebrated in a tragedy by the Latin poet Naevius. In 218 BC it regained its independence after the Roman defeat in the neighbourhood by Hannibal's army; however it fell again to Roman rule in 197 BC, when it was also set to fire.

Never to recover its former splendour, it was annexed to the colonia of Piacenza, and remained under that city’s control after the fall of the Western Roman Empire.

In the Middle Ages Casteggio came under the influence of Pavia, to which it was assigned by Frederick Barbarossa in 1164. In 1441 it was acquired by Cesare Martinengo, and was later ruled by the Simonetta, Sforza, Bentivoglio and Del Carretto dynasties. It was heavily damaged during the Italian Wars of late 15th and early 16th centuries.

== Notable people ==
- Birthplace of the explorer Giuseppe Maria Giulietti.

== Demographic evolution ==
Historical population

Year	Pop.	±%
1861	3,238	—
1871	3,547	+9.5%
1881	3,925	+10.7%
1901	4,605	+17.3%
1911	5,290	+14.9%

Year	Pop.	±%
1921	5,337	+0.9%
1931	5,469	+2.5%
1936	5,687	+4.0%
1951	6,095	+7.2%
1961	7,030	+15.3%

Year	Pop.	±%
1971	7,813	+11.1%
1981	7,417	−5.1%
1991	7,276	−1.9%
2001	6,337	−12.9%

Source: Data from ISTAT
