= Robecco =

Robecco may refer to one of the following comuni in northern Italy:

- Robecco sul Naviglio, in the province of Milan
- Robecco d'Oglio, in the province of Cremona
- Robecco Pavese, in the province of Pavia
