= Torricella Verzate =

- Comune
- Comune di Torricella Verzate
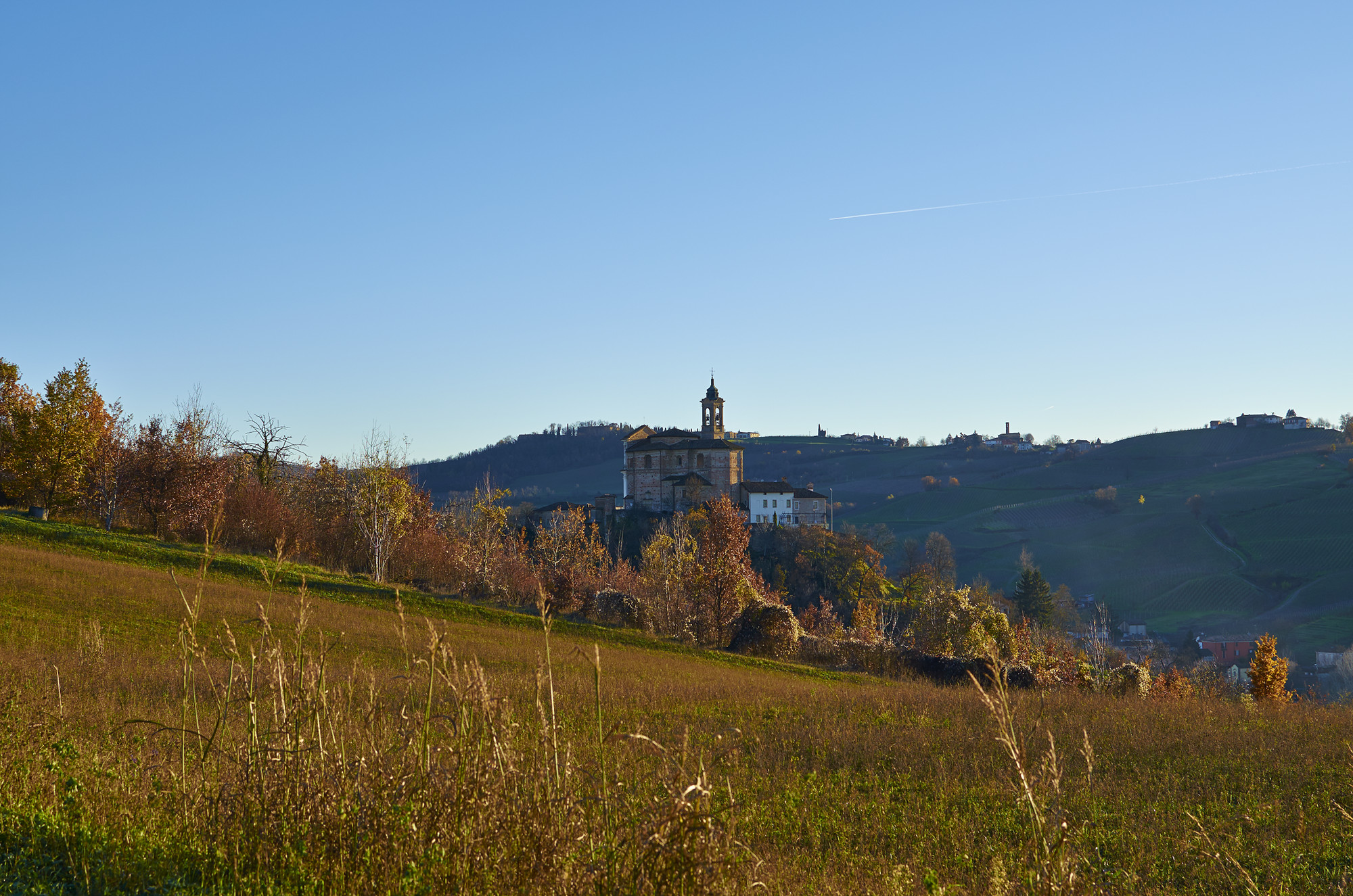

- Location within Italy Location within Lombardy
- Coordinates: 45°1′N 9°10′E
- Country: Italy
- Region: Lombardy
- Province: Province of Pavia (PV)

Area
  - Total: 3.6 km^{2} (1.4 sq mi)
- Elevation: 160 m (520 ft)

Population (Dec. 2004)
  - Total: 829
  - Density: 230/km^{2} (600/sq mi)
- Demonym: Torricellesi
- Time zone: UTC+1 (CET)
  - Summer (DST): UTC+2 (CEST)
- Postal code: 27050
- Dialing code: 0383

Torricella Verzate is a comune (municipality) in the Province of Pavia in the Italian region Lombardy, located about 50 km (31 mi) south of Milan and about 20 km (12 mi) south of Pavia. As of December 31, 2004, it had a population of 829 and an area of 3.6 km^{2} (1.4 sq mi).

Torricella Verzate borders the following municipalities: Corvino San Quirico, Mornico Losana, Oliva Gessi, Robecco Pavese, Santa Giuletta.

== Demographic evolution ==
Historical population

Year	Pop.	±%
1861	847	—
1871	890	+5.1%
1881	932	+4.7%
1901	984	+5.6%
1911	1,010	+2.6%

Year	Pop.	±%
1921	974	−3.6%
1931	936	−3.9%
1936	892	−4.7%
1951	885	−0.8%
1961	924	+4.4%

Year	Pop.	±%
1971	804	−13.0%
1981	768	−4.5%
1991	730	−4.9%
2001	802	+9.9%

Source: Data from ISTAT
