= Casatisma =

- Comune
- Comune di Casatisma
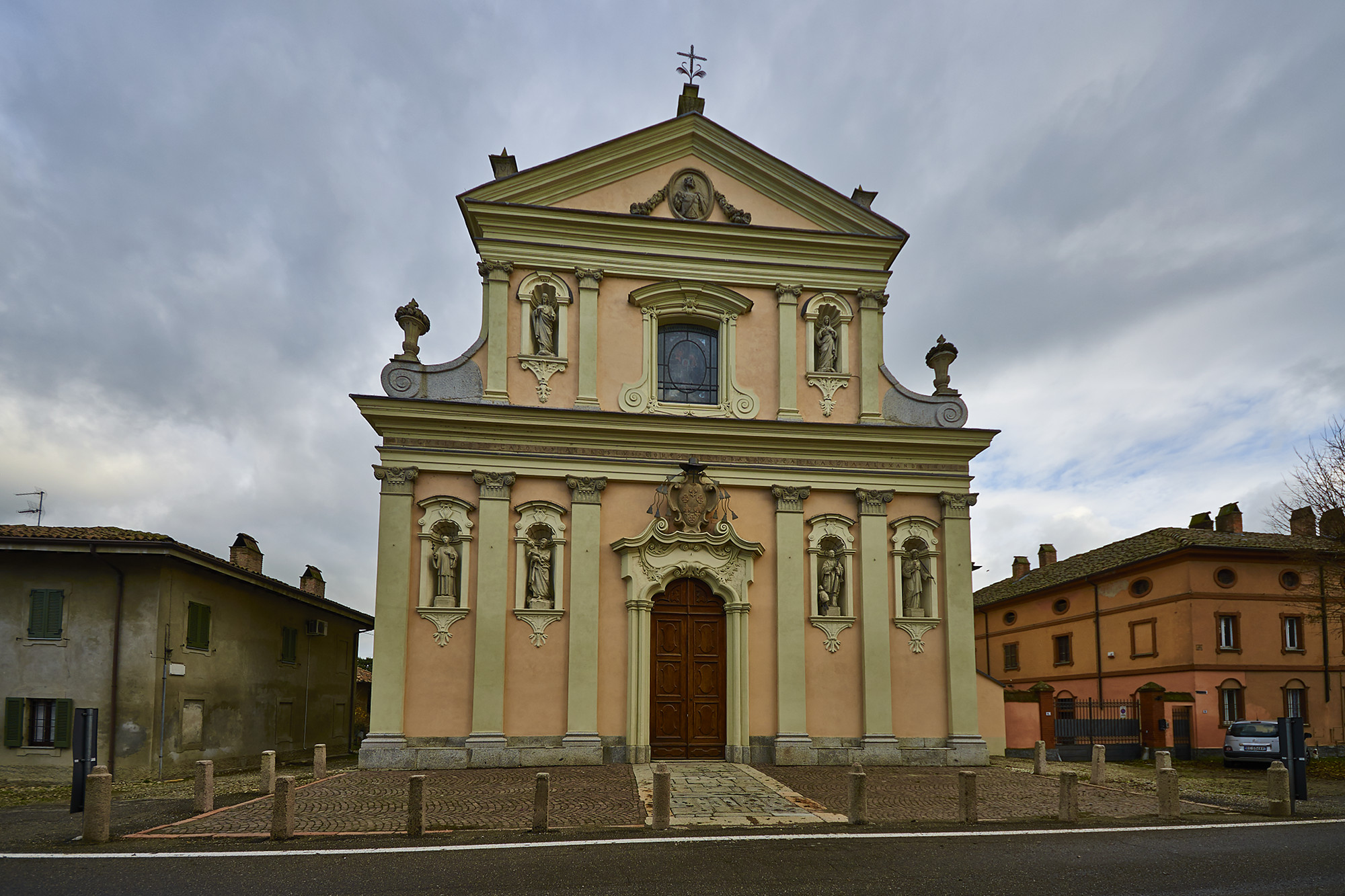

- Location within Italy Location within Lombardy
- Coordinates: 45°3′N 9°8′E
- Country: Italy
- Region: Lombardy
- Province: Pavia (PV)

Government
  - Mayor: Vittorio Castagnola

Area
  - Total: 5.5 km^{2} (2.1 sq mi)
- Elevation: 77 m (253 ft)

Population (31 May 2017)
  - Total: 894
  - Density: 160/km^{2} (420/sq mi)
- Demonym: Casatismesi
- Time zone: UTC+1 (CET)
  - Summer (DST): UTC+2 (CEST)
- Postal code: 27040
- Dialing code: 0383
- Website: Official website

Casatisma is a comune (municipality) in the Province of Pavia in the Italian region of Lombardy, located about 45 km south of Milan and about 15 km south of Pavia.

Casatisma borders the following municipalities: Bressana Bottarone, Casteggio, Castelletto di Branduzzo, Corvino San Quirico, Robecco Pavese, Verretto.
