= Villa Durazzo-Pallavicini =

Villa in Genoa, Italy

Villa Durazzo Pallavicini
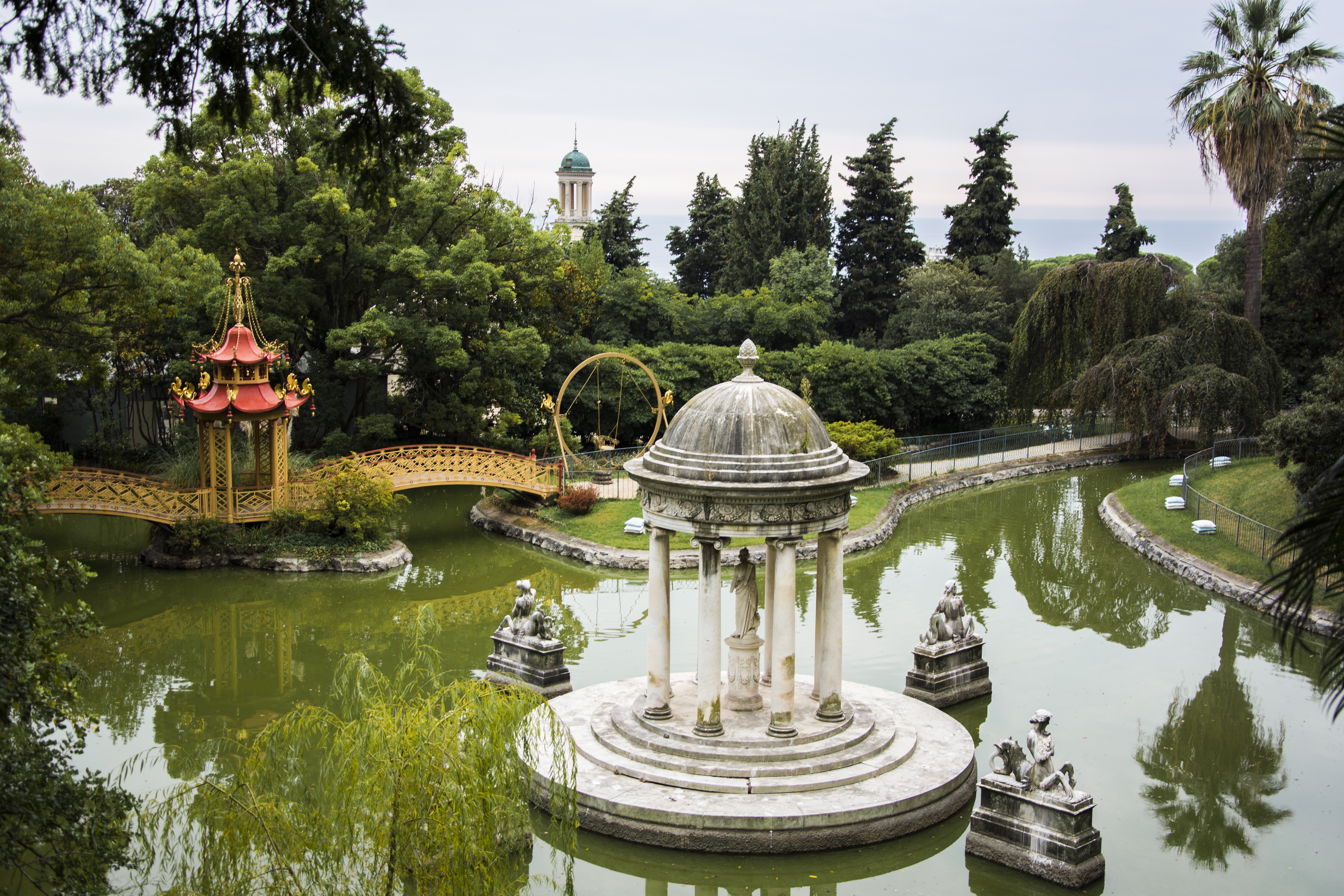

General information
- Location: Pegli, Genoa, Italy

The Villa Durazzo-Pallavicini is a villa with notable 19th-century park in the English romantic style and a small botanical garden. The villa now houses the Museo di Archeologia Ligure, and is located at Via Pallavicini 13, immediately next to the railway station in Pegli, a suburb of Genoa, Italy. The park and botanical garden are open daily except mondays.

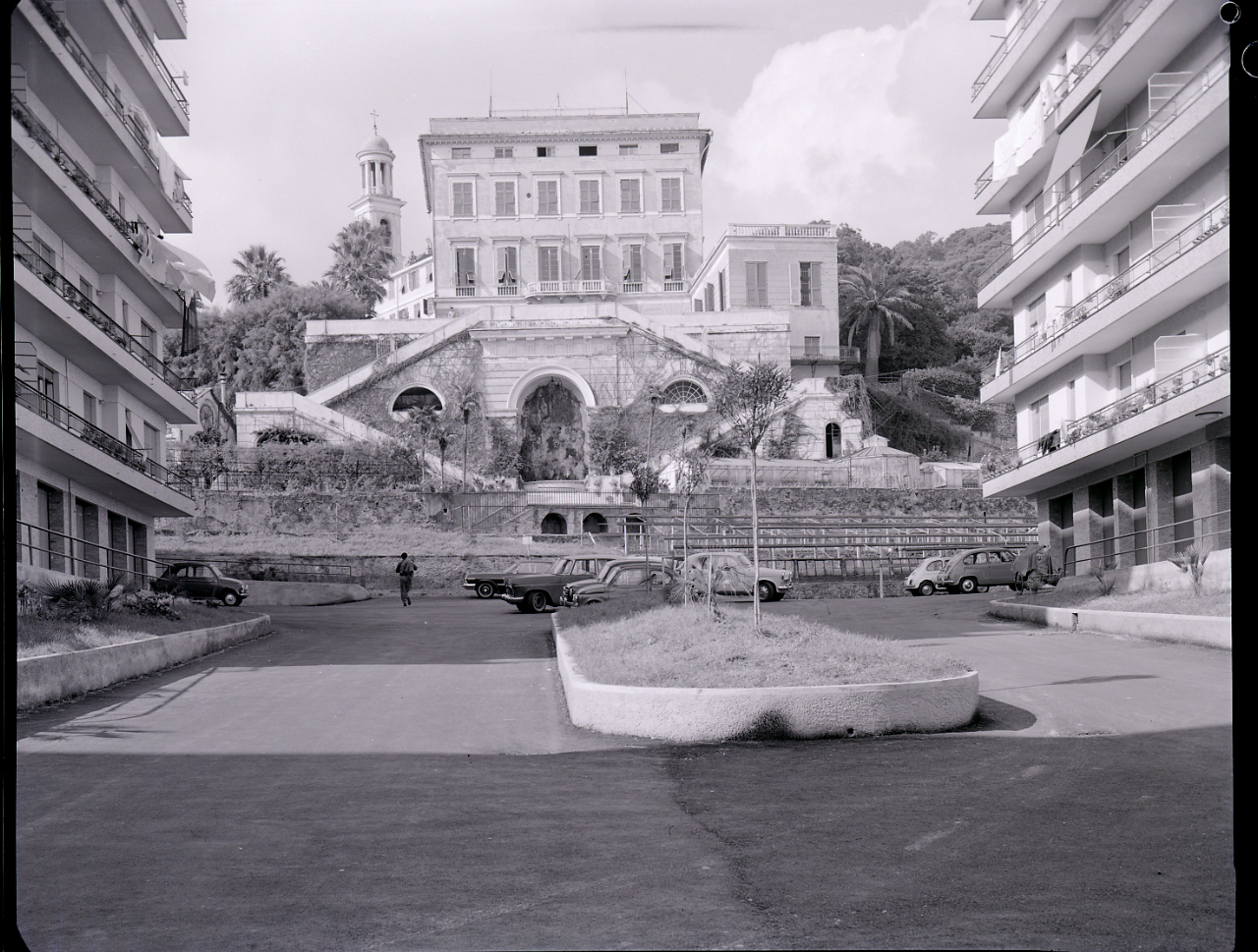
The villa photographed by Paolo Monti in 1963

The estate was begun in the late 17th century by Clelia Durazzo Grimaldi, who established the Giardino botanico Clelia Durazzo Grimaldi at that time. Today's park was created by her nephew Ignazio Alessandro Pallavicini after he inherited the property.

The park was designed by Michele Canzio, set designer for the Teatro Carlo Felice, and built between 1840 and 1846. It covers some 97,000 m^{2} of hillside behind the villa. Although recognizably in the English romantic style, the garden is highly theatrical, to the point of being organized as a series of scenes forming a play with prologue and three acts (Return to Nature, Memory, Purification). Structures and statues through the garden form focal points to this libretto.

When the park opened in September 1846, on the occasion of the VIII Congresso degli Scienziati Italiani, it quickly gained national fame. In 1928 its current owner, Matilde Gustinani, donated both park and botanical garden to Genoa for use as a public park. Through the remainder of the 20th century, the garden fell into some disrepair, and indeed was threatened in 1972 by construction of a nearby highway. Its restoration began in 1991, however, in honor of Columbus' discovery of America. As of 2006 about half of the park is open for visitors.

In 2017 the park was elected the most beautiful garden in Italy.

The park contains two ponds, a dozen notable structures, various statues, and an extensive grotto. The grotto represents a Dantesque inferno, with walkways and subterranean lake through which the visitor may ascend to paradise. In former years, visitors could explore the grotto by boat. Structures include a Coffee House in the shape of triumphal arch, Rustic House, Madonna's Chapel, Mausoleum of the Captain, Temple of Diana, Flower House, Turkish Temple, Obelisk, and Chinese Pagoda.

The park also contains a number of plantings of botanical interest, including mature specimens of Araucaria bidwillii, Cedrus libani, Cinnamomum camphora, Jubaea chilensis, Picconia excelsa, Firmiana simplex, Quercus suber, Podocarpus macrophyllus, many exotic palms and a stand of some 160 Camellia japonica.

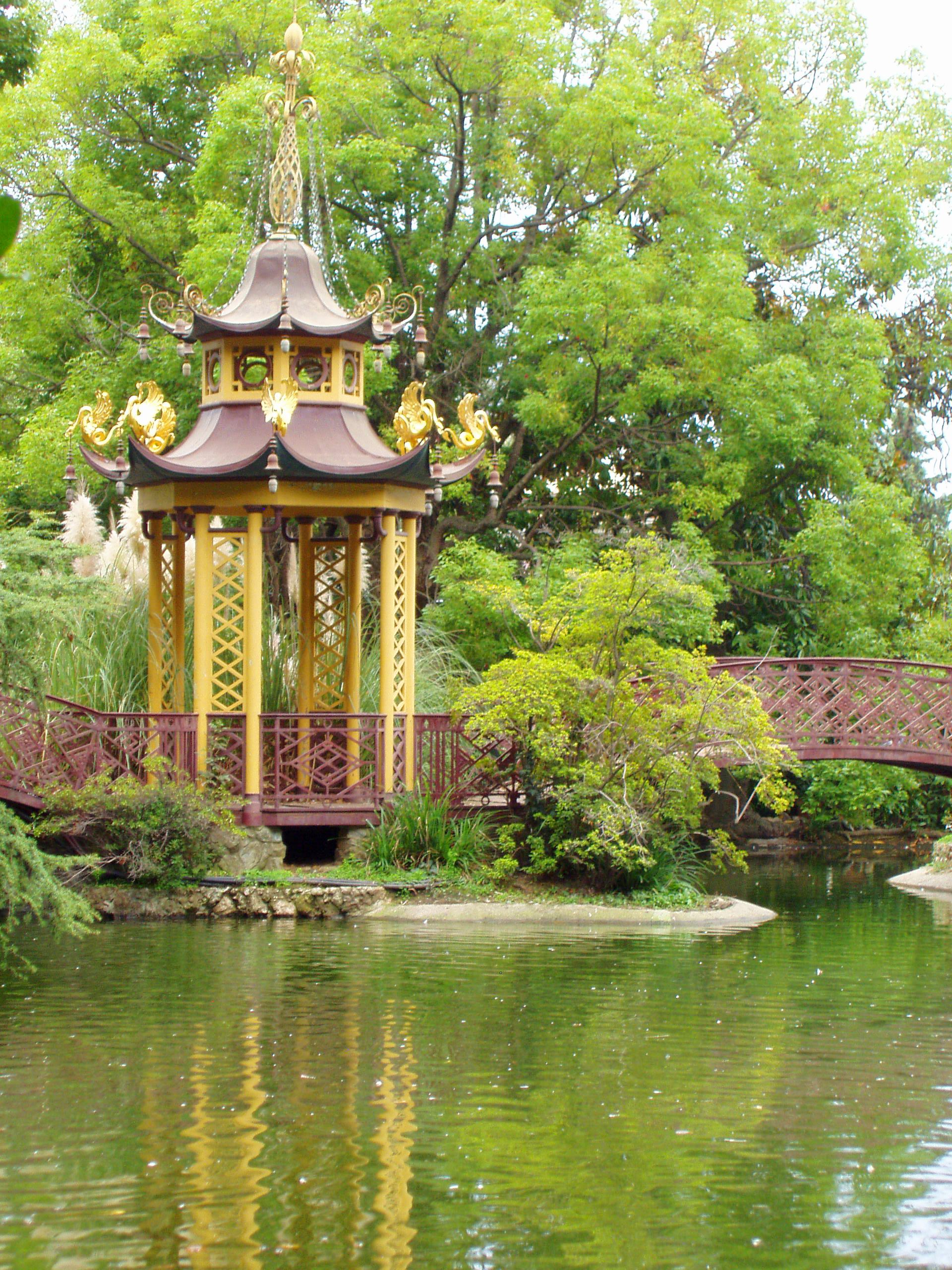
Chinese pagoda

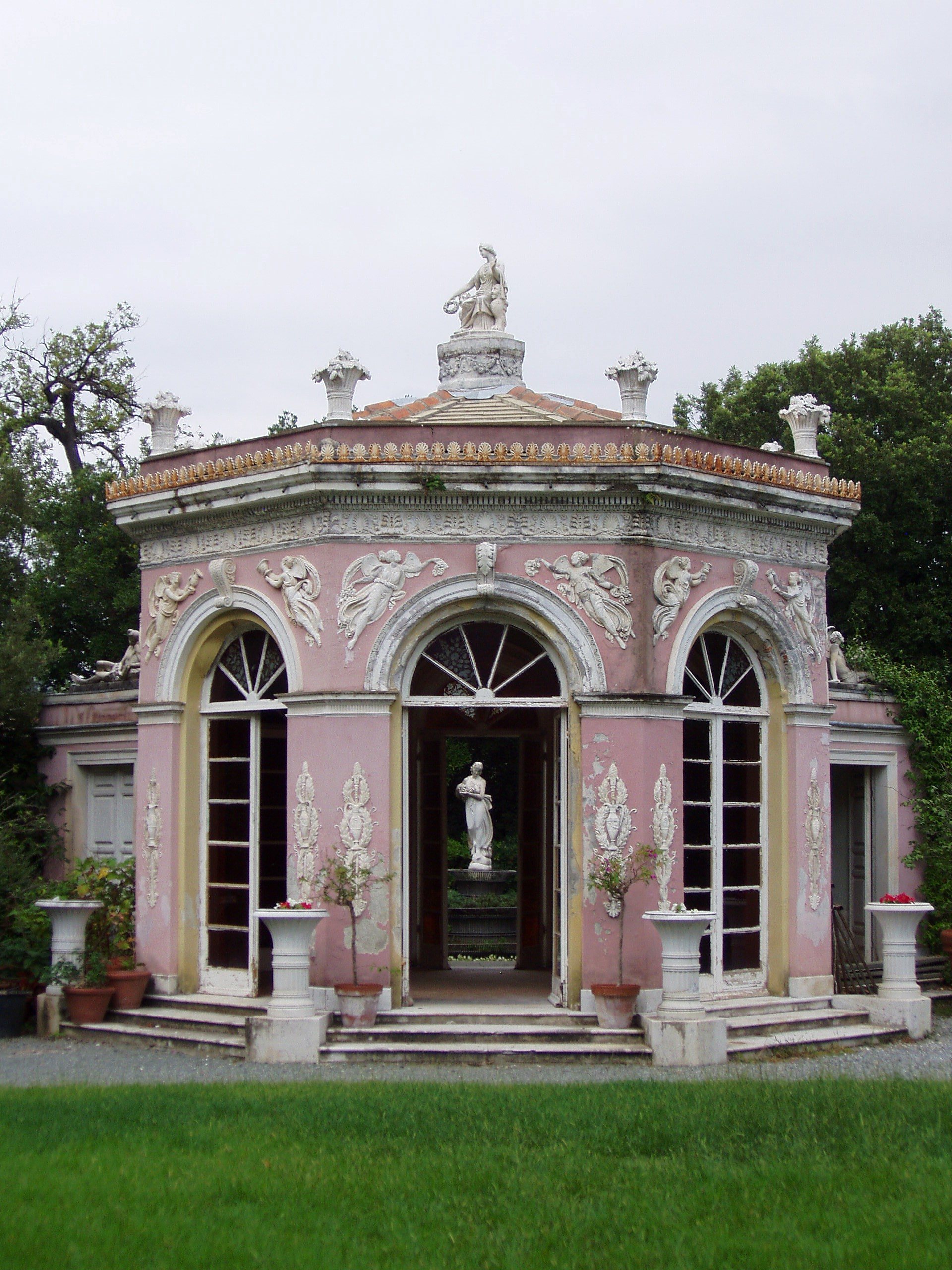
Flower house

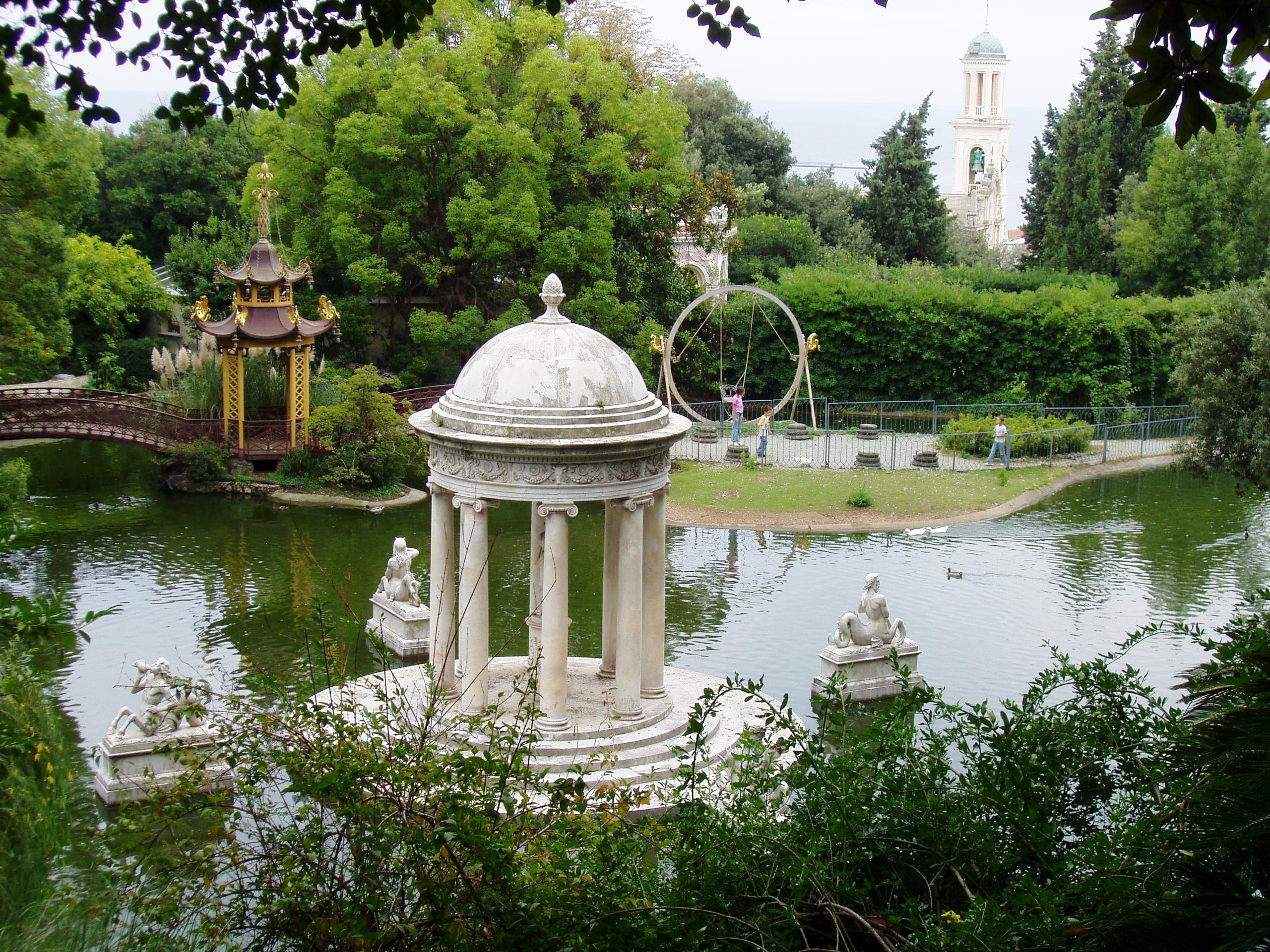
The gardens

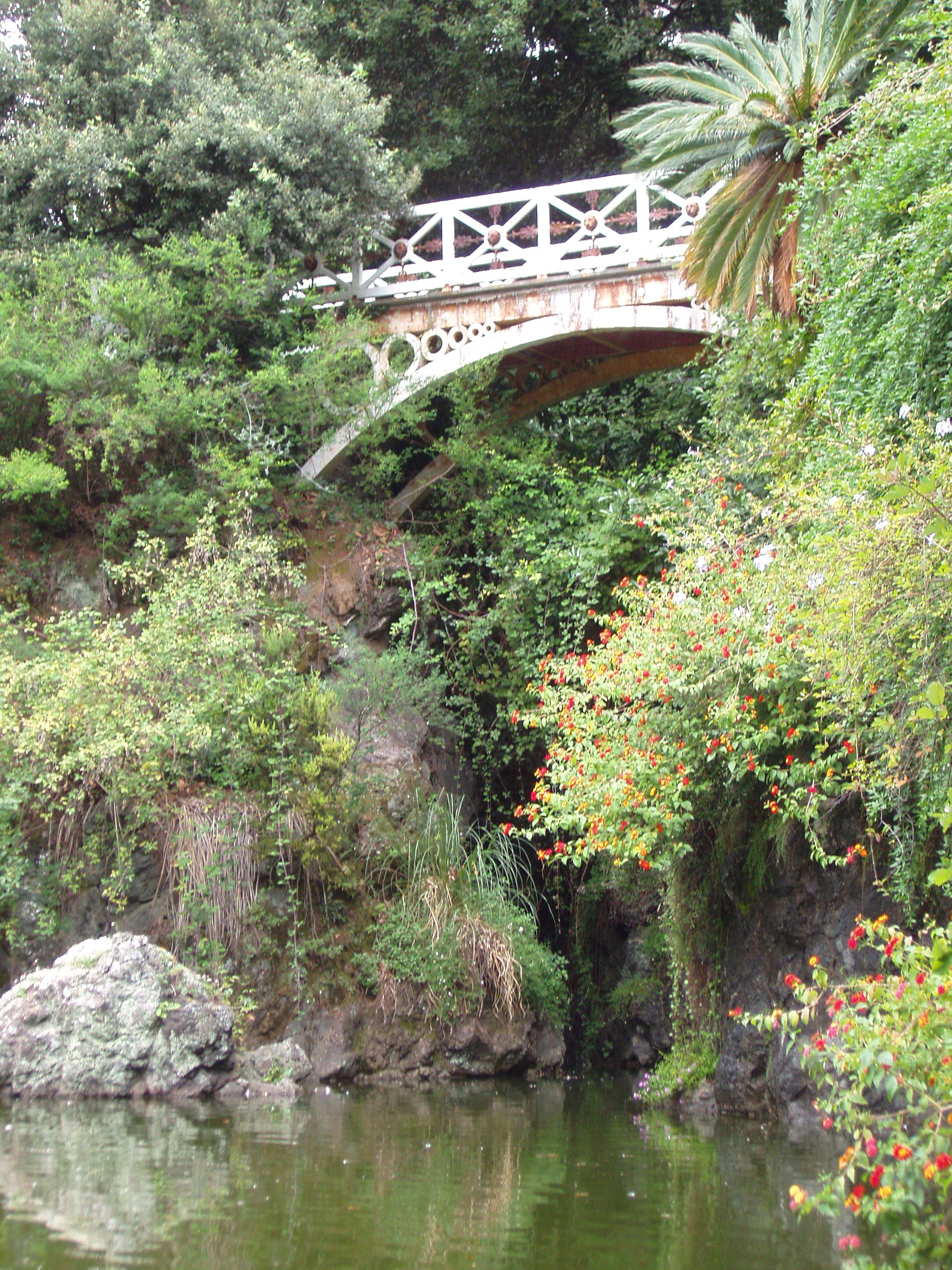
Roman bridge

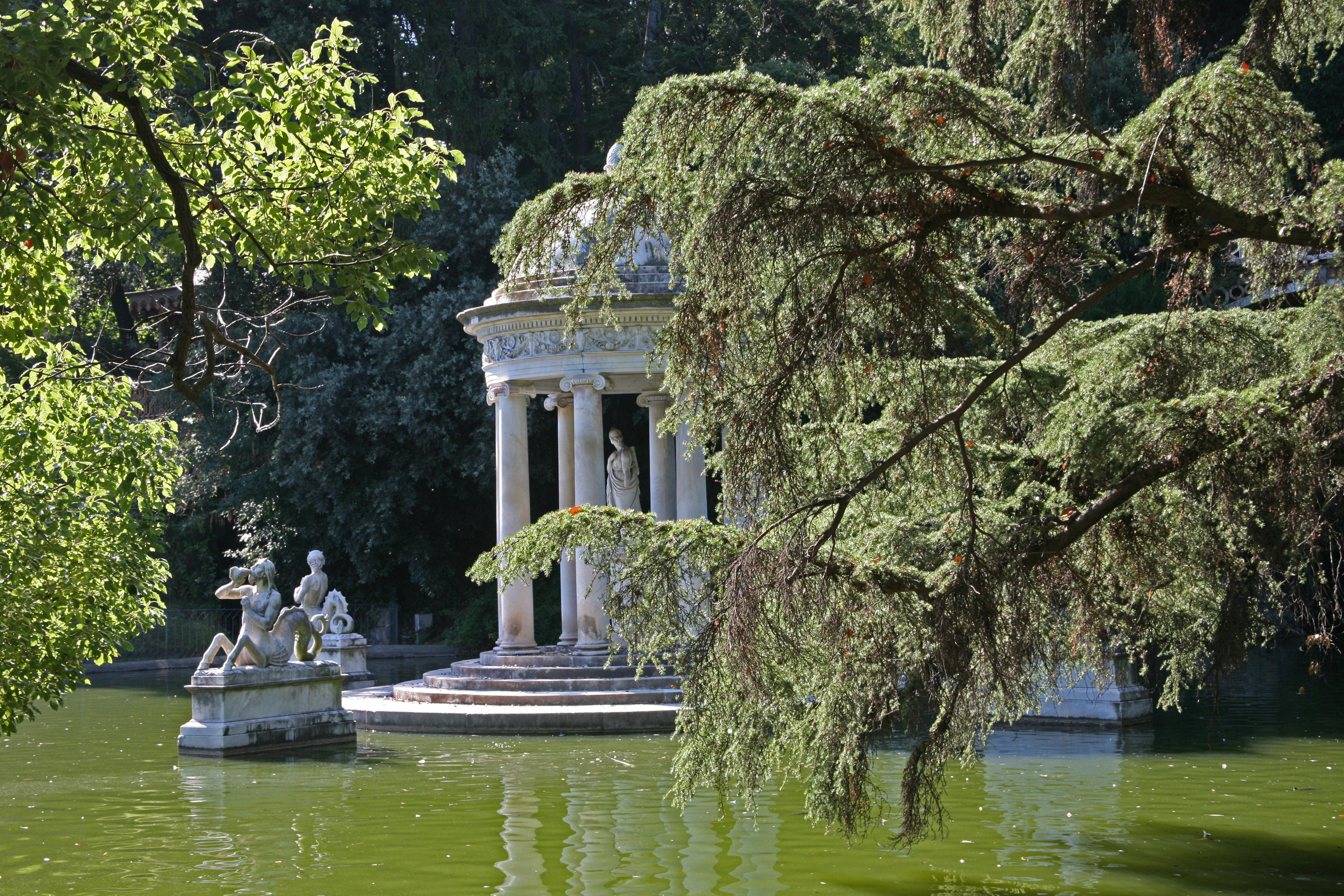
Temple of Diana

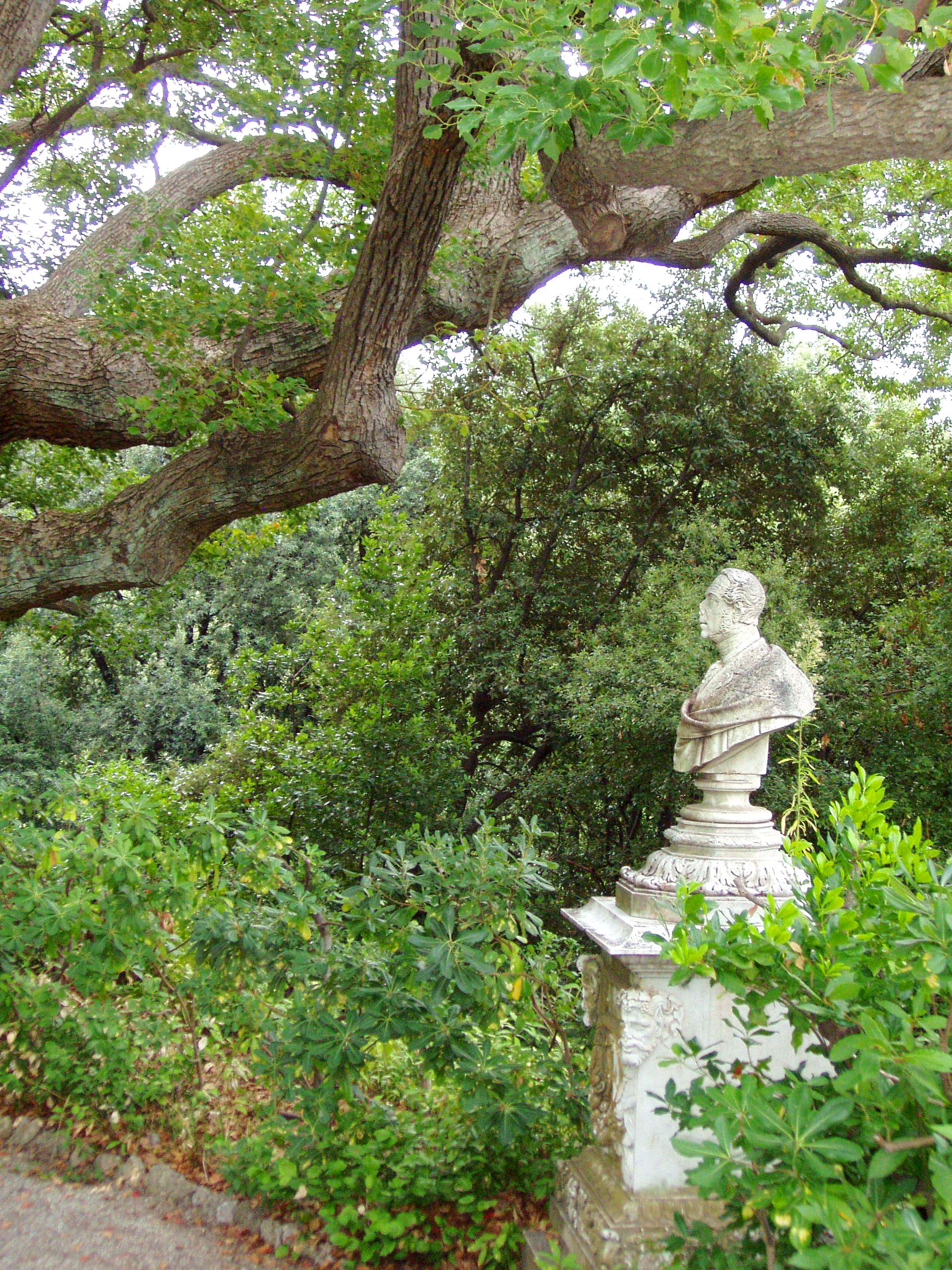
Bust of Michele Canzio

== See also ==
- Villa Gandolfi Pallavicini, Bologna
- Villas of Genoa
