= Siege of Alessandria (1175) =

1174–1175 siege during the War of the First Lombard League

- Part of the War of the First Lombard League in the Guelph-Ghibelline conflict
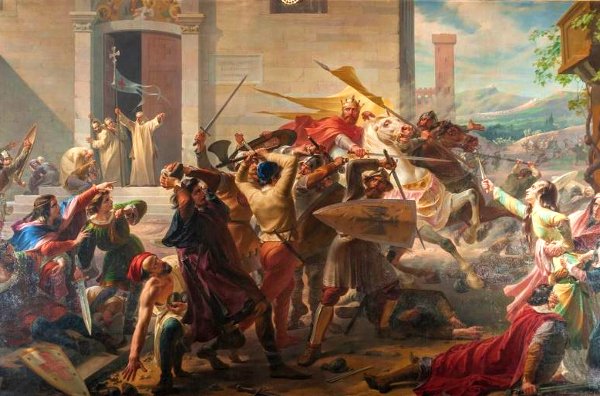
- Expulsion of Emperor Frederick Barbarossa from Alessandria by Carlo Arienti, 1848/51
Date	29 October 1174 – 13 April 1175
Location	Alessandria, Kingdom of Italy
Result	Lombard League victory: Imperial siege abandoned; Alessandria remains in League hands; Lombard relief army forces Frederick to withdraw toward Pavia

Belligerents
Holy Roman Empire: Pavia; Marquisate of Montferrat; Imperial Italian contingents; Brabantine and other mercenaries; Bohemian contingent; Genoese crossbowmen	Lombard League: Alessandria; Piacenza

Commanders and leaders
Frederick Barbarossa; William V of Montferrat; Philip of Cologne; Arnold of Trier; Otto of Wittelsbach	Anselmo Medico; Alessandrian civic commanders

Strength
15,000–20,000: About 8,000 entered Italy with Frederick; Substantial reinforcements from Pavia and Montferrat; Brabantine and other mercenaries; German and Bohemian contingents; Genoese crossbowmen	2,000–4,000: Alessandrian civic militia; 150 well-equipped Piacentine infantry under Anselmo Medico

Casualties and losses
1,000–2,000 killed, wounded or captured: At least 300 killed in the final assault; Numerous prisoners; Heavy losses from disease, desertion and winter conditions	Several hundred killed or wounded

The Siege of Alessandria was fought from 29 October 1174 to 13 April 1175 between the forces of Frederick Barbarossa, Holy Roman Emperor, and the newly founded commune of Alessandria, supported by the Lombard League. It formed the central operation of Frederick's fifth Italian campaign and was one of the most important episodes of the War of the First Lombard League. Alessandria had been founded in 1167–1168 by communities of the Tanaro valley with the support of the anti-imperial communes and named after Pope Alexander III. Its creation was both a military measure and a political assertion, since the foundation of a new city challenged prerogatives claimed by imperial government in the Kingdom of Italy.

Frederick entered Italy in 1174 with a substantial army and initially achieved important political successes, including the submission of Asti and the renewed adherence of several northern Italian communities. Alessandria nevertheless resisted despite its incomplete fortifications. The siege became a prolonged contest of logistics and endurance in which heavy rain, flooding, cold, shortages and desertion progressively weakened the imperial army. A coordinated Lombard relief operation in spring 1175 threatened Frederick's position from the east. His final attempt to capture Alessandria through a tunnel failed with severe losses, after which the defenders launched a successful sortie. Frederick abandoned the siege and withdrew in good order towards Pavia, where the opposing armies subsequently confronted one another near Montebello. The defence preserved Alessandria and demonstrated the League's growing ability to coordinate military action across numerous autonomous communes.

== Background ==
The siege developed from the transformation of the political balance in northern Italy after Frederick's fourth Italian campaign. During the 1150s and early 1160s the emperor had repeatedly been able to exploit rivalries among the communes, relying upon Italian allies against cities such as Milan. The destruction of Milan in 1162 represented the high point of that earlier system of imperial coercion, but it also contributed to a wider consolidation of opposition. By 1167 the Lombard League had emerged as a durable coalition capable of coordinating diplomacy, military obligations and mutual defence among communities whose interests otherwise frequently conflicted.

Alessandria was one of the clearest manifestations of that change. The new settlement united communities around Rovereto and Bergoglio on opposite sides of the Tanaro and occupied an important position on routes linking Liguria, Piedmont and Lombardy. Its foundation was supported by Milan and the League and protected communications through an area otherwise influenced by the imperial ally William V of Montferrat. The choice of the name Alessandria, honouring Alexander III, gave the city an unmistakable political significance. Its creation also asserted a communal capacity to establish a new urban centre independently of imperial authorization.

When Frederick returned to Italy in September 1174, the strategic circumstances differed markedly from those of his earlier campaigns. Most of the major pre-Alpine communes were now hostile, limiting the available approaches into Lombardy. He crossed the western Alps through the Mont Cenis route, where the support of the County of Savoy and Montferrat gave him a comparatively secure line into Piedmont. After destroying Susa and securing the submission of Turin and Asti, he joined the Pavesan forces and advanced against Alessandria.

The choice had several dimensions. Alessandria was politically provocative, militarily exposed and apparently vulnerable: only six years old, it lacked a completed stone circuit and was defended mainly by a broad ditch, earthworks and masonry gates. Its destruction could have provided the conspicuous demonstration of imperial power needed to encourage further defections from the League. It also lay close to Pavia and Montferrat, giving Frederick friendly bases and sources of reinforcement. Yet the decision concentrated a large field army against a position that could in principle have been bypassed. Frederick's campaign therefore combined strategic calculation with the political importance attached to honour, obedience and the legitimacy of the new commune. Alessandria had become too symbolically charged for its survival to be regarded simply as a local military problem.

== Forces ==
Frederick had entered Italy with a force reported at approximately 8,000 fighting men, heavily dependent upon Brabantine and other mercenaries because relatively few German secular princes participated personally in the expedition. His entourage nevertheless included a substantial group of ecclesiastical princes and experienced military retainers. At Alessandria this original force was reinforced extensively by troops from Pavia and Montferrat, which supplied much of the manpower required to surround the city and sustain a siege. Contemporary estimates placed the combined army at around 20,000 men, although the figure is best treated as an indication of scale rather than a precise muster.

The composition of the army presented an important tactical problem. Frederick possessed a formidable concentration of heavy cavalry, highly effective for campaigning and open battle, but his transalpine forces lacked sufficient siege specialists and equipment for a major fortified operation. Engineers and labourers therefore had to be hired, while Genoa supplied technical assistance and crossbowmen. Pavia and Montferrat contributed infantry necessary for maintaining the investment.

The Alessandrian garrison was much smaller. Its core consisted of the city's own militia, reinforced by 150 well-equipped Piacentine infantry under the knight Anselmo Medico. Other League forces had been distributed to threatened centres before Frederick's advance, including Milanese and Brescian contingents sent to Asti. The defenders nevertheless possessed important compensating advantages. Their earthworks and ditch were stronger obstacles than their apparent simplicity suggested, they knew the ground intimately, and the civilian population could reinforce the fighting men during an assault. Most importantly, their logistical requirements were confined within a stocked city, whereas the much larger imperial host had to maintain thousands of men and horses throughout a northern Italian winter.

== Siege ==
Frederick formally began the siege on 29 October 1174. Expectations of a rapid capitulation proved mistaken. The recent fate of Milan provided the inhabitants with a powerful reason to resist: since Alessandria itself embodied defiance of imperial authority, surrender carried the possibility not merely of political submission but of the city's destruction and the dispersal of its population. The defenders therefore chose prolonged resistance while expecting the League eventually to organize a relief effort.

The first months exposed the mismatch between the strength of Frederick's field army and the demands of siege warfare. Imperial engineers constructed fortified camps, stone-throwing engines and other equipment, while Genoese specialists and Italian infantry supplemented the predominantly mounted strength of the imperial host. The earthworks nevertheless proved difficult to breach. The broad defensive ditch restricted direct assaults and the nearby rivers and watercourses magnified the effect of exceptionally wet weather. Conditions deteriorated through the winter. Persistent rain flooded the imperial camps and turned the surrounding terrain into mud, while cold weather and scarcity of fuel and fodder placed severe strain on men and horses. Supplying perhaps 15,000–20,000 troops during winter was itself an enormous undertaking. The defenders had entered the siege after the autumn harvest and grape harvest, leaving their stores comparatively full, whereas the surrounding countryside could not indefinitely sustain the besieging army. The effects were especially serious for the heavy cavalry, whose warhorses required large quantities of grain and good fodder.

Desertion compounded the logistical problem. Parts of the Bohemian contingent, weakened by hunger, sickness and the loss of horses, attempted to leave around Christmas; some were intercepted by Milanese forces and captured. The imperial army nonetheless maintained the blockade for months, illustrating considerable organizational resilience despite conditions that steadily reduced its combat effectiveness. Frederick also attempted to broaden the campaign strategically. Christian of Mainz operated from the south-east against Bologna and its allies, creating the possibility of a two-front pressure on the League. The design was sophisticated: if the eastern communes were compelled to concentrate against Christian, they would be unable to send major forces westward to Alessandria. The League responded by dividing responsibilities among its members. Cremona, Bologna, Mantua and Parma concentrated against the eastern threat while the remaining cities prepared a relief army for Alessandria. Christian won local tactical successes and captured several positions, but failed to threaten Bologna sufficiently to prevent the western concentration.

By March the League had begun an unusually early mobilization. Milanese troops and their carroccio marched on 11 March toward Piacenza, where contingents from numerous Lombard, Emilian and Venetian cities assembled. The resulting relief army probably numbered many thousands and may have reached 20,000–30,000 men. It advanced westward with infantry, cavalry, several carrocci and substantial baggage, while Piacentine river craft provided logistical support along the Po. With the relief army approaching, Frederick attempted to force a conclusion. Pavesan engineers constructed a tunnel intended to pass beneath the ditch and earthworks. On 12 April imperial siege engines intensified their bombardment while several hundred dismounted knights entered the hastily completed passage. The attackers emerged inside Alessandria but encountered immediate resistance from the Piacentine infantry and the inhabitants. Fighting spread through the streets as civilians joined the defence from the ground and from the earthworks. Darkness and unfamiliarity with the city further disadvantaged the imperial troops. The tunnel then partially collapsed, killing many and isolating those who had already entered, who were forced to surrender.

The defenders immediately exploited the failure with a sortie against the imperial siege works. Communal cavalry and infantry drove back the troops guarding a large siege tower and set it alight with incendiary materials. German soldiers and Genoese crossbowmen were killed in the burning structure, while additional prisoners were carried back into the city. At least 200 imperial knights were killed in the tunnel operation and urban fighting, with approximately another 100 soldiers and missile troops killed in the sortie and destruction of the tower. By Easter morning the final attempt had failed and the League relief army was close enough to threaten the imperial rear. Frederick now faced the possibility of being trapped between Alessandria and a numerically formidable field army. He reacted rapidly. The imperial encampment was dismantled, material that could not be carried was burned, and the army withdrew in disciplined order toward the north-east. The decision prevented the failure of the siege from becoming the destruction of the field army and preserved a still formidable imperial force for the confrontation that followed.

== Aftermath ==
The abandonment of Alessandria was a clear military and political success for the Lombard League. The city had survived a siege by one of the largest imperial armies brought into northern Italy, while the League had demonstrated that a coalition of autonomous communes could coordinate operations across several theatres. Its response to the imperial two-pronged strategy was particularly significant: separate forces contained Christian of Mainz in Emilia while the principal allied army concentrated for the relief of Alessandria. The operation showed a level of intercommunal planning that went beyond the temporary battlefield alliances of earlier decades.

Frederick's performance was more mixed. The original selection of Alessandria had political and strategic logic, particularly as a potential demonstration of strength capable of destabilising the League, and the wider campaign displayed considerable strategic range. The coordinated operations with Christian of Mainz reveal an attempt to stretch League resources across northern and central Italy rather than merely batter a single city. The execution of the siege, however, exposed serious weaknesses. The campaign opened too late in the year for starvation to work quickly, the defenders possessed ample supplies, the imperial army was poorly adapted to prolonged siege operations, and its heavy cavalry became an enormous logistical liability during a wet and exceptionally difficult winter. The final assault compounded these problems with severe combat losses. Yet Frederick's response after its failure prevented a tactical reverse from becoming a strategic catastrophe. Faced with an approaching relief army and the possibility of encirclement, he abandoned the siege promptly and withdrew in coherent formation. The imperial army therefore remained sufficiently dangerous that the League did not attempt to destroy it during the subsequent confrontation.

The two armies met near Montebello, where the scale of the opposing forces made a battle potentially enormous by contemporary standards. The League arranged its infantry and cavalry around four carrocci representing major regional groupings, creating a broad line intended to restrict the mobility of the imperial cavalry. Frederick's army, however, was exhausted after six months of siege, while the League had already achieved its immediate strategic objective by saving Alessandria. Neither side had a compelling reason to risk everything in a general engagement. Negotiations followed, producing the truce of Montebello on 17 April 1175. The agreement permitted Frederick to proceed safely toward Pavia and opened wider negotiations among the emperor, the League and the papacy. The siege therefore contributed directly to a temporary shift from military coercion toward diplomacy. The consequences went beyond Alessandria itself: Frederick had been compelled to negotiate with a League whose legal legitimacy he disputed, while the communes had demonstrated that mutual defence could preserve even one of their most politically provocative members.

The negotiations ultimately failed, with Alessandria itself becoming one of the central obstacles. Frederick continued to insist upon the removal of a city whose foundation challenged imperial prerogatives, whereas the League could not sacrifice a member after having been constituted around principles of collective protection. A compromise that required the destruction or depopulation of Alessandria therefore threatened the credibility of the alliance itself. Hostilities resumed later in 1175. Frederick retained a core of heavy cavalry in Italy and planned a renewed campaign against Alessandria for 1176, this time intending to operate during the harvest season and destroy the surrounding crops rather than repeat the winter siege. The renewed struggle instead culminated in the Battle of Legnano on 29 May 1176, making the resistance of Alessandria an important prelude to the wider political and military settlement eventually reached between emperor, pope and communes.

== Sources ==
- Freed, John B. (2016). Frederick Barbarossa: The Prince and the Myth. New Haven: Yale University Press. ISBN 978-0-300-12276-3.
- Grillo, Paolo (2018). Le guerre del Barbarossa: I comuni contro l'imperatore (in Italian). Rome: Laterza. ISBN 978-88-5813-369-9.
- Grillo, Paolo (2024). Legnano. Le grandi battaglie della storia (in Italian). Milan: Pelago / Out of Nowhere. ISBN 979-12-5501-257-3.
