= Corvino San Quirico =

- Comune
- Comune di Corvino San Quirico
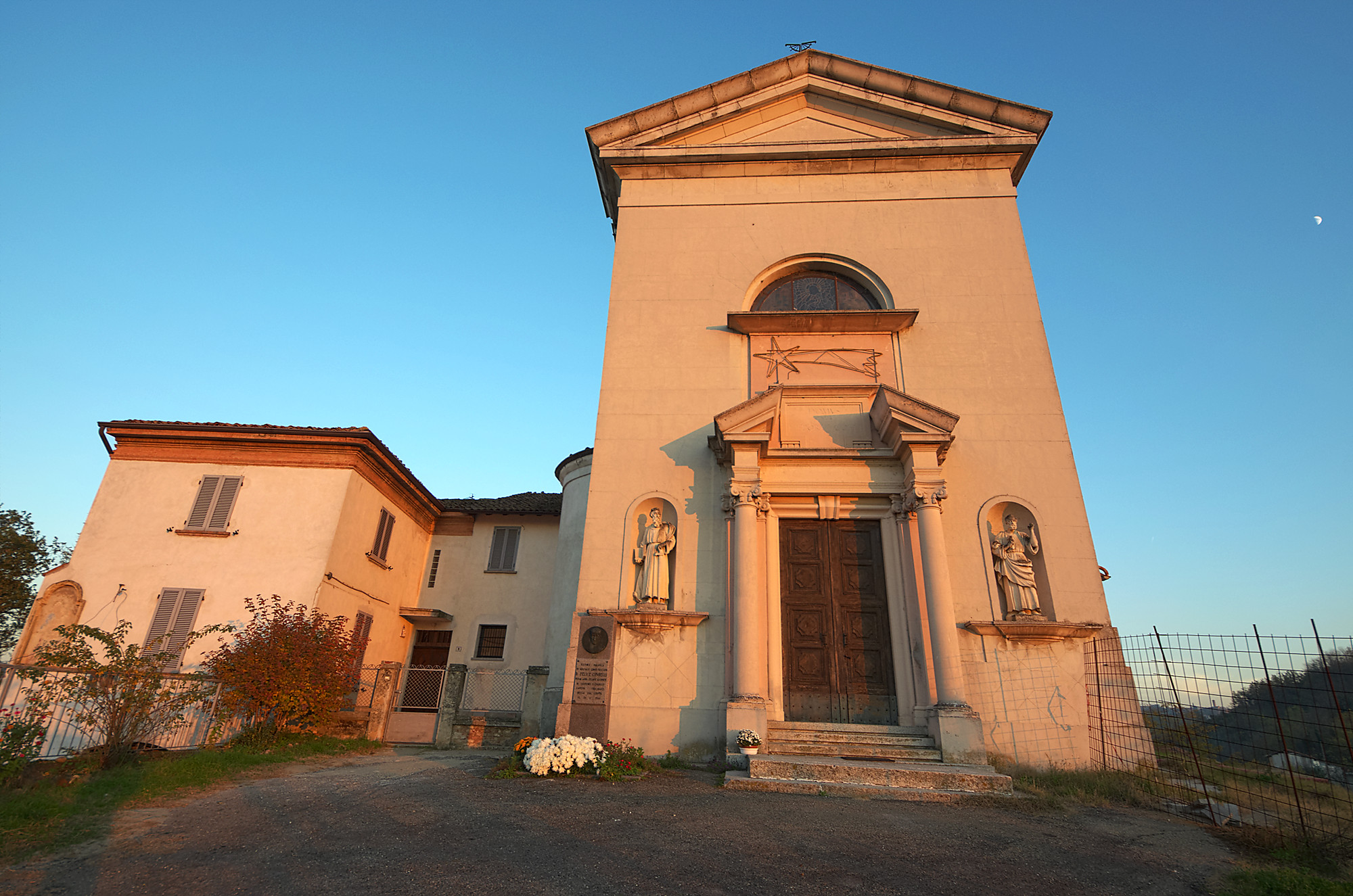

- Location within Italy Location within Lombardy
- Coordinates: 44°59′N 9°10′E
- Country: Italy
- Region: Lombardy
- Province: Province of Pavia (PV)

Area
  - Total: 4.4 km^{2} (1.7 sq mi)

Population (Dec. 2004)
  - Total: 1,084
  - Density: 250/km^{2} (640/sq mi)
- Time zone: UTC+1 (CET)
  - Summer (DST): UTC+2 (CEST)
- Postal code: 27050
- Dialing code: 0383

Corvino San Quirico is a comune (municipality) in the Province of Pavia in the Italian region Lombardy, located about 50 km (31 mi) south of Milan and about 20 km (12 mi) south of Pavia. As of 31 December 2004, it had a population of 1,084 and an area of 4.4 km^{2} (1.7 sq mi).

Corvino San Quirico borders the following municipalities: Calvignano, Casatisma, Casteggio, Oliva Gessi, Robecco Pavese, Torricella Verzate.

== Demographic evolution ==
Historical population

Year	Pop.	±%
1861	1,331	—
1871	1,442	+8.3%
1881	1,537	+6.6%
1901	1,687	+9.8%
1911	1,607	−4.7%

Year	Pop.	±%
1921	1,634	+1.7%
1931	1,551	−5.1%
1936	1,571	+1.3%
1951	1,425	−9.3%
1961	1,349	−5.3%

Year	Pop.	±%
1971	1,219	−9.6%
1981	1,261	+3.4%
1991	1,164	−7.7%
2001	1,092	−6.2%

Source: Data from ISTAT
