= Castelletto =

Castelletto is the name of a number of places in Italy:

- Castelletto Cervo, province of Biella
- Castelletto d'Erro, province of Alessandria
- Castelletto di Branduzzo, province of Pavia
- Castelletto d'Orba, province of Alessandria
- Castelletto Merli, province of Alessandria
- Castelletto Molina, province of Asti
- Castelletto Monferrato, province of Alessandria
- Castelletto sopra Ticino, province of Novara
- Castelletto Stura, province of Cuneo
- Castelletto Uzzone, province of Cuneo
- Castelletto (Genoa), a residential quarter in the historic centre of Genoa
- Castelletto, a 700-ft high rock next to the Tofana_di_Rozes mountain in Veneto
- Castelletto (district), district in Marino, Italiy
