= Lungavilla =

- Comune
- Comune di Lungavilla
- Church of Santa Maria Assunta

- Location within Italy Location within Lombardy
- Coordinates: 45°2′N 9°5′E
- Country: Italy
- Region: Lombardy
- Province: Pavia (PV)

Government
  - Mayor: Andrea Daprati

Area
  - Total: 6.82 km^{2} (2.63 sq mi)
- Elevation: 74 m (243 ft)

Population (30 September 2017)
  - Total: 2,420
  - Density: 355/km^{2} (919/sq mi)
- Demonym: Lungavillesi
- Time zone: UTC+1 (CET)
  - Summer (DST): UTC+2 (CEST)
- Postal code: 27053
- Dialing code: 0383
- Website: Official website

Lungavilla is a comune (municipality) in the Province of Pavia in the Italian region Lombardy, located about 50 km south of Milan and about 15 km southwest of Pavia.

Lungavilla borders the following municipalities: Castelletto di Branduzzo, Montebello della Battaglia, Pizzale, Verretto, Voghera.

== People ==
- Luigi Furini, (1954), poet
