= Pizzale =

- Comune
- Comune di Pizzale
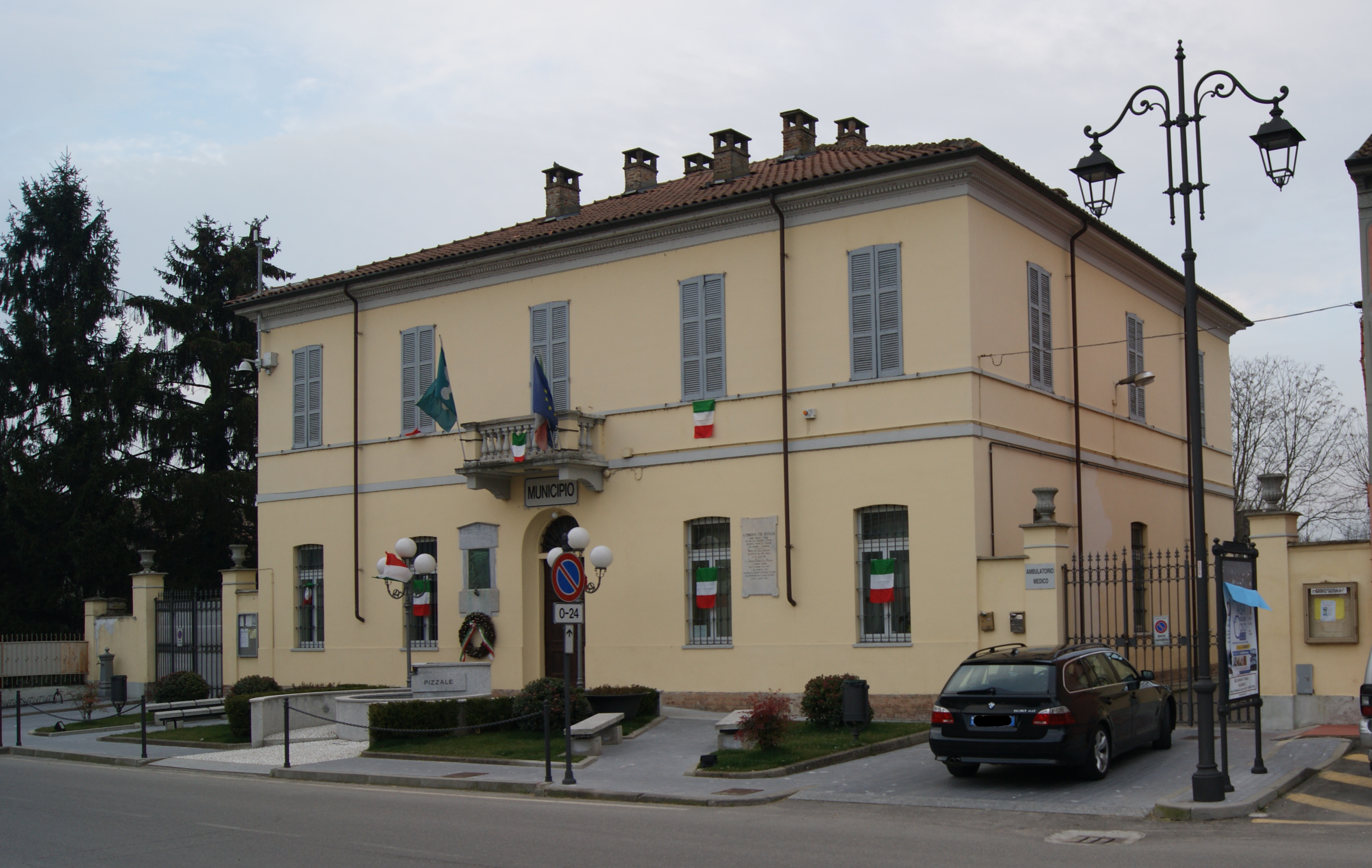
- Town hall.

- Location within Italy Location within Lombardy
- Coordinates: 45°2′N 9°3′E
- Country: Italy
- Region: Lombardy
- Province: Pavia (PV)

Government
  - Mayor: Sonia Grazioli

Area
  - Total: 7.09 km^{2} (2.74 sq mi)
- Elevation: 728 m (2,388 ft)

Population (31 December 2010)
  - Total: 733
  - Density: 103/km^{2} (268/sq mi)
- Demonym: Pizzalesi
- Time zone: UTC+1 (CET)
  - Summer (DST): UTC+2 (CEST)
- Postal code: 27050
- Dialing code: 0383
- Website: Official website

Pizzale is a comune (municipality) in the Province of Pavia in the Italian region Lombardy, located about 50 km south of Milan and about 20 km southwest of Pavia.

Pizzale borders the following municipalities: Castelletto di Branduzzo, Lungavilla, Pancarana, Voghera.
