= Pancarana =

- Comune
- Comune di Pancarana
- Coat of arms

- Location within Italy Location within Lombardy
- Coordinates: 45°4′N 9°3′E
- Country: Italy
- Region: Lombardy
- Province: Pavia (PV)

Government
  - Mayor: Paola Viola

Area
  - Total: 6.2 km^{2} (2.4 sq mi)
- Elevation: 68 m (223 ft)

Population (Dec. 2004)
  - Total: 315
  - Density: 51/km^{2} (130/sq mi)
- Demonym: Pancaranesi
- Time zone: UTC+1 (CET)
  - Summer (DST): UTC+2 (CEST)
- Postal code: 27050
- Dialing code: 0383
- Website: Official website

Pancarana is a comune (municipality) in the province of Pavia in the Italian region Lombardy, located about 45 km (28 mi) south of Milan and about 14 km (8.7 mi) southwest of Pavia, in the Oltrepò Pavese.

Pancarana borders the following municipalities: Bastida Pancarana, Castelletto di Branduzzo, Cervesina, Mezzana Rabattone, Pizzale, Voghera, Zinasco.

== History ==
Pancarana was a fief of the bishop of Pavia from the 10th to the 18th century.

== Demographic evolution ==
Historical population

Year	Pop.	±%
1861	681	—
1871	781	+14.7%
1881	699	−10.5%
1901	668	−4.4%
1911	732	+9.6%

Year	Pop.	±%
1921	692	−5.5%
1931	662	−4.3%
1936	646	−2.4%
1951	578	−10.5%
1961	519	−10.2%

Year	Pop.	±%
1971	433	−16.6%
1981	363	−16.2%
1991	360	−0.8%
2001	322	−10.6%

Source: Data from ISTAT
