= Calvignano =

- Comune
- Comune di Calvignano
- Coat of arms

- Location within Italy Location within Lombardy
- Coordinates: 44°59′N 9°10′E
- Country: Italy
- Region: Lombardy
- Province: Province of Pavia (PV)

Area
  - Total: 6.9 km^{2} (2.7 sq mi)

Population (Dec. 2004)
  - Total: 112
  - Density: 16/km^{2} (42/sq mi)
- Time zone: UTC+1 (CET)
  - Summer (DST): UTC+2 (CEST)
- Postal code: 27045
- Dialing code: 0383

Calvignano is a comune (municipality) in the Province of Pavia in the Italian region Lombardy, located about 50 km (31 mi) south of Milan and about 20 km (12 mi) south of Pavia. As of 31 December 2004, it had a population of 112 and an area of 6.9 km^{2} (2.7 sq mi).

Calvignano borders the following municipalities: Borgo Priolo, Casteggio, Corvino San Quirico, Montalto Pavese, Oliva Gessi.

== Demographic evolution ==
Historical population

Year	Pop.	±%
1861	310	—
1871	348	+12.3%
1881	398	+14.4%
1901	401	+0.8%
1911	429	+7.0%

Year	Pop.	±%
1921	479	+11.7%
1931	427	−10.9%
1936	403	−5.6%
1951	400	−0.7%
1961	276	−31.0%

Year	Pop.	±%
1971	189	−31.5%
1981	152	−19.6%
1991	152	+0.0%
2001	130	−14.5%

Source: Data from ISTAT
