= Verretto =

- Comune
- Comune di Verretto
- Location within Italy Location within Lombardy
- Coordinates: 45°3′N 9°8′E
- Country: Italy
- Region: Lombardy
- Province: Pavia (PV)
- Frazioni: Borgo, Carantano, Dorna, Filiberta, Lottona

Government
  - Mayor: Luigino Polin

Area
  - Total: 2.71 km^{2} (1.05 sq mi)
- Elevation: 74 m (243 ft)

Population (31 December 2010)
  - Total: 377
  - Density: 139/km^{2} (360/sq mi)
- Demonym: Verrettesi
- Time zone: UTC+1 (CET)
  - Summer (DST): UTC+2 (CEST)
- Postal code: 27053
- Dialing code: 0383
- Website: Official website

Verretto is a comune (municipality) in the Province of Pavia in the Italian region Lombardy, located about 45 km (28 mi) south of Milan and about 15 km (9.3 mi) south of Pavia.

Verretto borders the following municipalities: Casatisma, Casteggio, Castelletto di Branduzzo, Lungavilla, Montebello della Battaglia.
