= Oliva Gessi =

- Comune
- Comune di Oliva Gessi
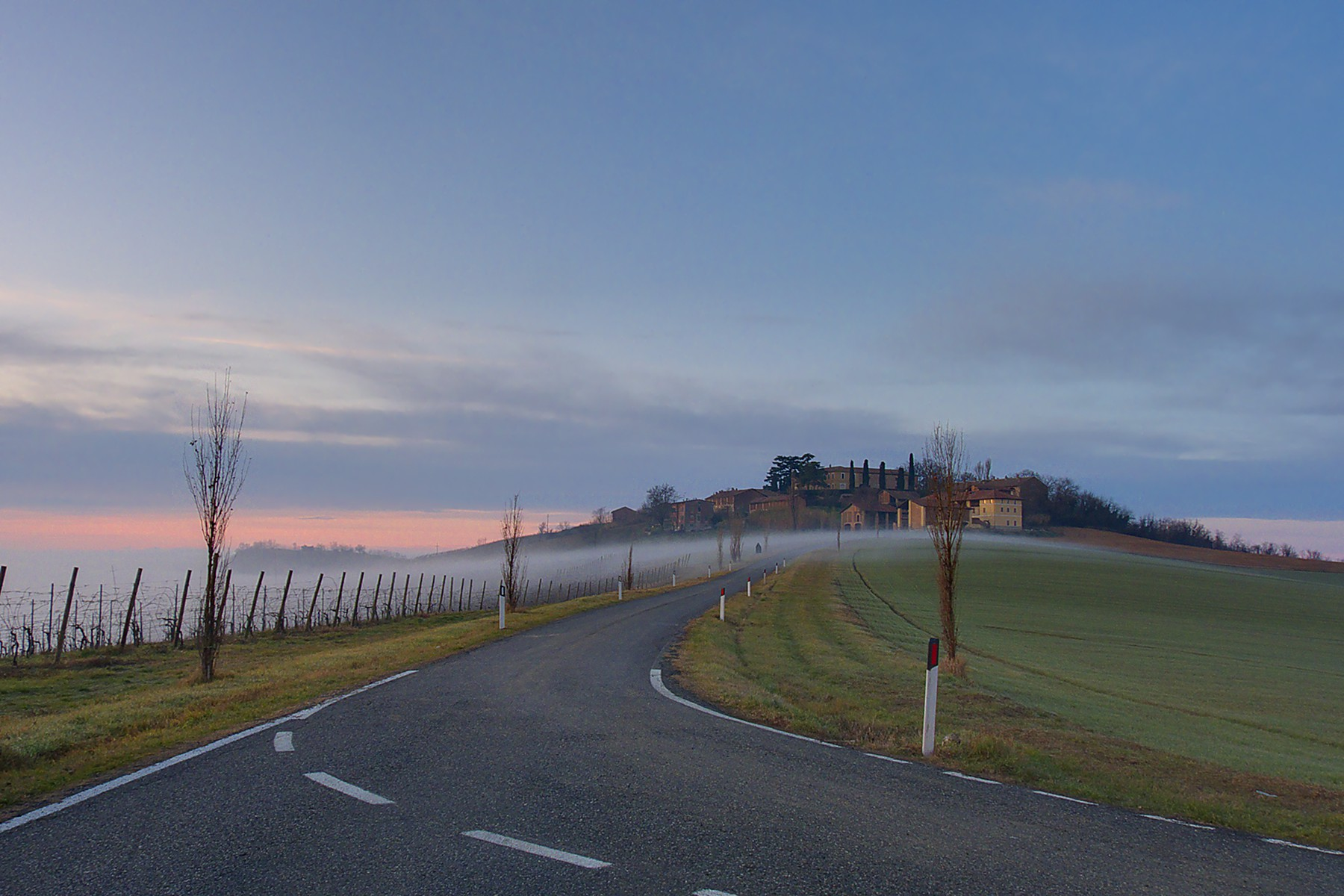

- Location within Italy Location within Lombardy
- Coordinates: 45°0′N 9°11′E
- Country: Italy
- Region: Lombardy
- Province: Province of Pavia (PV)
- Frazioni: Gessi, Rosso

Government
  - Mayor: Andrea Defilippi

Area
  - Total: 3.9 km^{2} (1.5 sq mi)
- Elevation: 245 m (804 ft)

Population (Dec. 2010)
  - Total: 179
  - Density: 46/km^{2} (120/sq mi)
- Demonym: olivesi
- Time zone: UTC+1 (CET)
  - Summer (DST): UTC+2 (CEST)
- Postal code: 27050
- Dialing code: 0383
- Website: http://www.comune.olivagessi.pv.it

Oliva Gessi is a comune (municipality) in the Province of Pavia in the Italian region Lombardy, located about 50 km (31 mi) south of Milan and about 20 km (12 mi) south of Pavia. As of 31 December 2004, it had a population of 196 and an area of 3.9 km^{2} (1.5 sq mi).

Oliva Gessi borders the following municipalities: Calvignano, Casteggio, Corvino San Quirico, Montalto Pavese, Mornico Losana, and Torricella Verzate.

== History ==
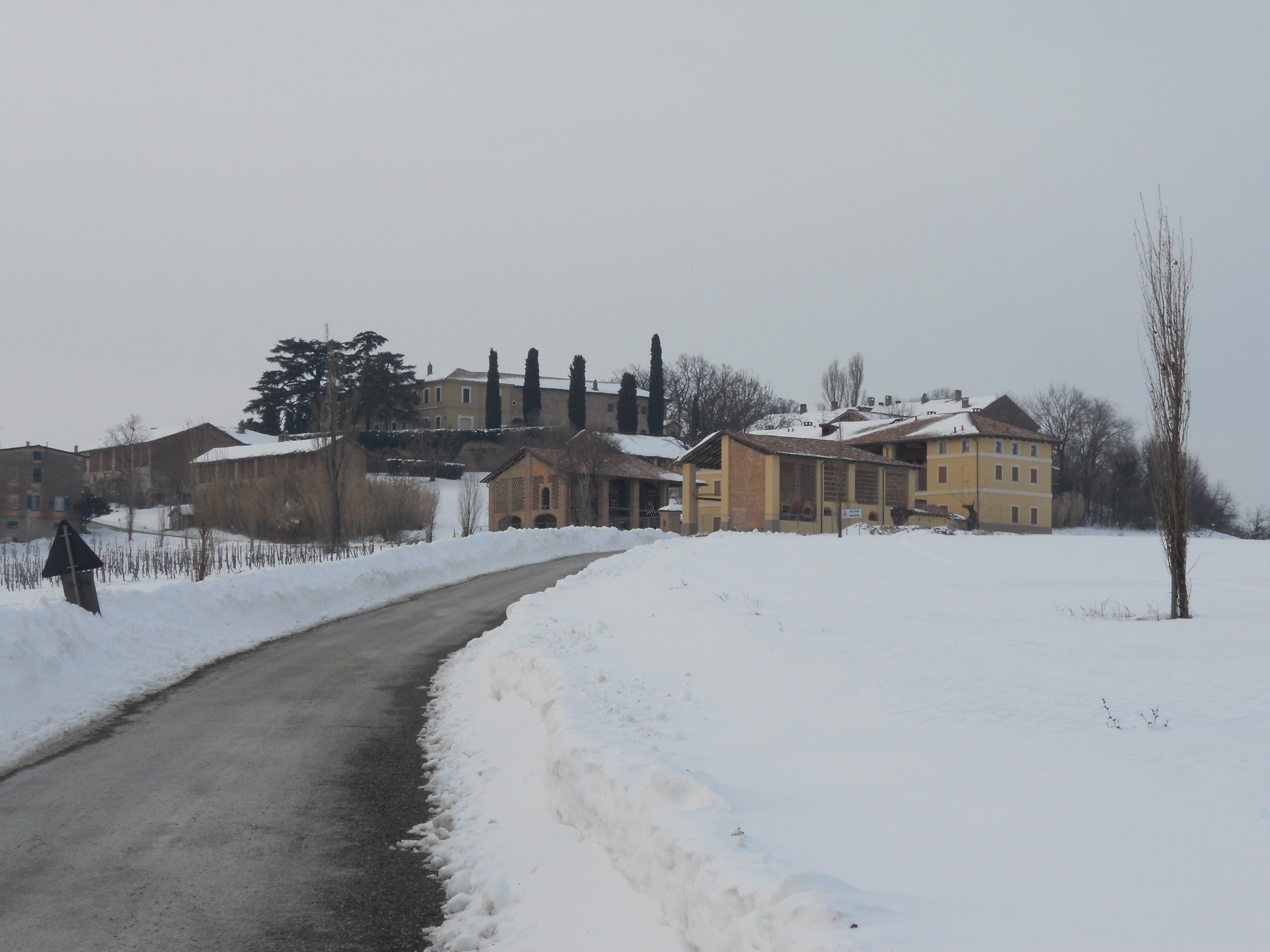
Winter panorama of Oliva Gessi

Oliva has been known since 972, when it was donated by Emperor Otto I to his daughter in law Theophano, who then in turn donated it (along with other properties in the nearby villages of Montalto and Mairano near Casteggio) to the monastery of Santa Maria delle Cacce in Pavia. Passed under the dominion of Pavia (1164), it was included in the podesteria (jurisdiction) of Montalto Pavese and enfeoffed to the family Belcredi. The domain of the monastery continued, as mere possession of land, under the rule of the feudal lords of Montalto; before the seventeenth century the property was passed to the family Isimbardi of Pavia, vassals of the neighboring Santa Giuletta, who owned the castle and about two-thirds of the lands of the village. With the extinction of the family Isimbardi in 1878, the property of the estate of Oliva passed to the De Benedetti family of Turin and then to another family from Milan.

Between 1928 and 1946 the municipality was abolished and aggregated to Corvino San Quirico.

== Demographic evolution ==
Historical population

| Year | Pop. | ±% |
|---|---|---|
| 1861 | 463 | — |
| 1871 | 500 | +8.0% |
| 1881 | 426 | −14.8% |
| 1901 | 504 | +18.3% |
| 1911 | 524 | +4.0% |

| Year | Pop. | ±% |
|---|---|---|
| 1921 | 539 | +2.9% |
| 1931 | 523 | −3.0% |
| 1936 | 489 | −6.5% |
| 1951 | 395 | −19.2% |
| 1961 | 355 | −10.1% |

| Year | Pop. | ±% |
|---|---|---|
| 1971 | 268 | −24.5% |
| 1981 | 227 | −15.3% |
| 1991 | 205 | −9.7% |
| 2001 | 200 | −2.4% |

Source: Data from ISTAT
