= Cervesina =

- Comune
- Comune di Cervesina
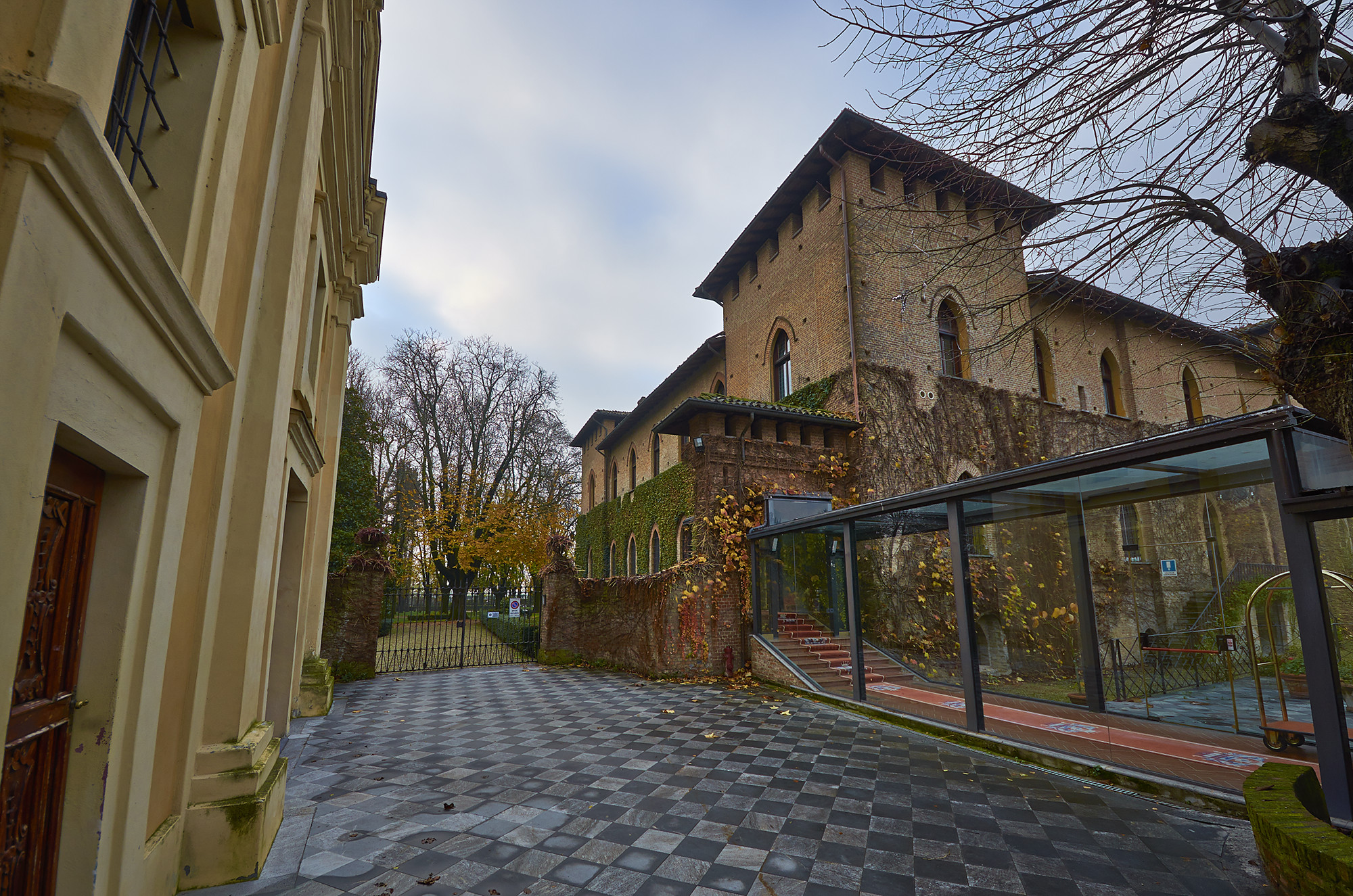

- Location within Italy Location within Lombardy
- Coordinates: 45°3′N 9°1′E
- Country: Italy
- Region: Lombardy
- Province: Province of Pavia (PV)

Area
  - Total: 12.5 km^{2} (4.8 sq mi)
- Elevation: 72 m (236 ft)

Population (Dec. 2004)
  - Total: 1,186
  - Density: 94.9/km^{2} (246/sq mi)
- Demonym: Cervesinesi
- Time zone: UTC+1 (CET)
  - Summer (DST): UTC+2 (CEST)
- Postal code: 27050
- Dialing code: 0383
- Website: Official website

Cervesina is a comune (municipality) in the Province of Pavia in the Italian region Lombardy, located about 45 kilometres (28 mi) south of Milan and about 15 kilometres (9 mi) southwest of Pavia. As of 31 December 2004, it had a population of 1,186 and an area of 12.5 square kilometres (4.8 mi^{2}).

Cervesina borders the following municipalities: Corana, Mezzana Rabattone, Pancarana, Voghera, Zinasco.

== Demographic evolution ==
Historical population

Year	Pop.	±%
1861	1,916	—
1871	2,119	+10.6%
1881	2,210	+4.3%
1901	2,193	−0.8%
1911	2,223	+1.4%

Year	Pop.	±%
1921	2,129	−4.2%
1931	1,954	−8.2%
1936	1,849	−5.4%
1951	1,675	−9.4%
1961	1,576	−5.9%

Year	Pop.	±%
1971	1,470	−6.7%
1981	1,344	−8.6%
1991	1,234	−8.2%
2001	1,200	−2.8%

Source: Data from ISTAT
