= Mornico Losana =

- Comune
- Comune di Mornico Losana
- Location of Mornico Losana in Italy Mornico Losana (Lombardy)
- Coordinates: 45°1′N 9°12′E
- Country: Italy
- Region: Lombardy
- Province: Province of Pavia (PV)

Government
  - Mayor: Ilaria Rosati (Impegno Civico per Mornico Losana)

Area
  - Total: 8.2 km^{2} (3.2 sq mi)
- Elevation: 284 m (932 ft)

Population (Dec. 2021)
  - Total: 595
  - Density: 73/km^{2} (190/sq mi)
- Demonym: Mornichesi
- Time zone: UTC+1 (CET)
  - Summer (DST): UTC+2 (CEST)
- Postal code: 27040
- Dialing code: 0383
- ISTAT code: 018101
- Patron saint: Saints Cosma and Damian
- Saint day: September 26
- Website: https://www.comunemornicolosana.pv.it

Mornico Losana (Murnigh in Oltrepò dialect) is a comune (municipality) in the Province of Pavia, in the Italian region of Lombardy. It is located about 50 km (31 mi) south of Milan and about 20 km (12 mi) south of Pavia. As of 31 December 2020, it had a population of 600 people and covered an area of 8.2 km^{2} (3.2 sq mi). The name of the comune derives from its two largest neighborhoods: Mornico and Losana.

== Geography ==
Mornico Losana is formed by hills of the Oltrepò Pavese region, stretching its territory between the valleys of Verzate and Val Sorda streams. On the top of the highest hill of the comune, the castle rises.

It is divided in the fractions of:

- Boffalora
- Casa Guarnone
- Casa Madama
- Cinque Strade
- Losana
- Montepezzuto
- Mornico
- Ronchi
- Valsorda

It borders the following municipalities:

- Montalto Pavese
- Oliva Gessi
- Pietra de' Giorgi
- Santa Giuletta
- Torricella Verzate

== Transport and Infrastructure ==
Mornico Losana is connected to Pietra de Giorgi and Torricella Verzate via the SP46 (Provincial Road). The only public transport available is the Autoguidovie Line 80, with two stops: in Piazza Libertà, at the core of the comune, and in Losana; in previous years there was also a stop in Casa Guarnone. Furthermore, all the roads in the municipality are delimited to 30km/h zone.

== Demographic evolution ==
Historical population

Year	Pop.	±%
1861	1,171	—
1871	1,253	+7.0%
1881	1,342	+7.1%
1901	1,550	+15.5%
1911	1,689	+9.0%

Year	Pop.	±%
1921	1,525	−9.7%
1931	1,528	+0.2%
1936	1,452	−5.0%
1951	1,336	−8.0%
1961	1,107	−17.1%

Year	Pop.	±%
1971	903	−18.4%
1981	831	−8.0%
1991	747	−10.1%
2001	728	−2.5%
2020	600	−17.6%

Source: Data from ISTAT
