= Villa Gandolfi Pallavicini =

Coordinates: 44.492070°N 11.401704°E

The Villa Gandolfi Pallavicini is a prominent suburban Baroque villa located on Via Martelli 22/24 in Bologna, Italy. It presently houses the Fondazione Alma Mater, an alumni association of the University of Bologna. The villa is also used for private functions.

== History ==
The villa was built by the aristocratic Alamandini family in the early 17th century, and in 1773 it was purchased by the Genoese Giovanni Luca Pallavicini, who was a Field marshal of the Holy Roman Empire. In 1770, a young Mozart stayed here in preparation for appearing before the Accademia Filarmonica di Bologna. The interior is frescoed with landscapes, quadratura, and mythologic themes.
