= Montebello della Battaglia =

- Comune
- Comune di Montebello della Battaglia
- Coat of arms

- Location within Italy Location within Lombardy
- Coordinates: 45°0′N 9°6′E
- Country: Italy
- Region: Lombardy
- Province: Province of Pavia (PV)

Government
  - Mayor: Andrea Marians (since 2019)

Area
  - Total: 15.74 km^{2} (6.08 sq mi)

Population (2023)
  - Total: 1,446
  - Density: 91.87/km^{2} (237.9/sq mi)
- Demonym: Montebellesi
- Time zone: UTC+1 (CET)
  - Summer (DST): UTC+2 (CEST)
- Postal code: 27054
- Dialing code: 0383
- Patron saint: Saints Gervaso and Protasio

Montebello della Battaglia is a comune (municipality) in the Province of Pavia in the Italian region Lombardy, located about 50 km south of Milan and about 20 km south of Pavia.

Montebello della Battaglia borders the following municipalities: Borgo Priolo, Casteggio, Codevilla, Lungavilla, Torrazza Coste, Verretto, Voghera.

It is famous for two battles: in that of 1800 the French army under Jean Lannes defeated an Austrian army; that of 1859, part of the Austro-Sardinian War (or Second Italian War of Independence) was a victory of the armies of France and Savoy, again over the Austrians (the attribute "della Battaglia", meaning "of the Battle", refers to the latter).

== Twin towns ==
Montebello della Battaglia is twinned with:

- Palestro, Italy, since 1984
