= Michele Canzio =

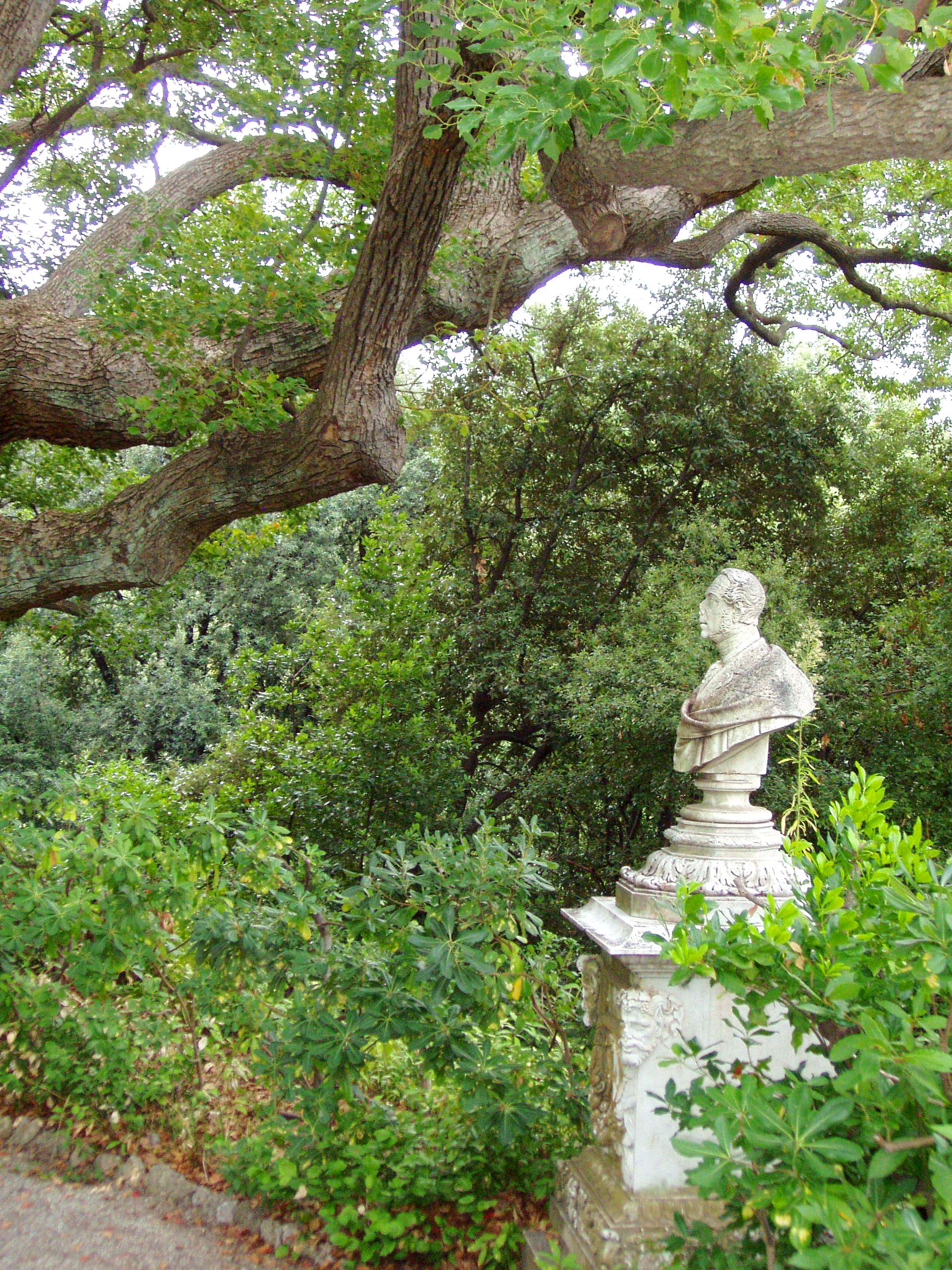
Bust of Michele Canzio in the Villa Durazzo-Pallavicini garden

Michele Canzio (1788–1868) was an Italian architect and painter, best known as stage designer for the Teatro Carlo Felice in Genoa. He also designed a remarkable garden at the Villa Durazzo-Pallavicini.

Canzio was born in Genoa, where at age 17 he designed Napoleon's triumphal arch. His activities in stage design began in 1818 at the Teatro di Sant'Agostino for "Matrimonio segreto" by Domenico Cimarosa, followed in 1819 by Rossini's "Aureliano in Palmira".

When the Teatro Carlo Felice was constructed, Canzio aided in its design, as well as the design for its inaugural ballet, "Gli adoratori del fuoco". From 1832 to 1836, and again from 1850 to 1854, he served as the theater's impresario, as well as serving as its principal stage designer until 1850. Canzio also oversaw Genoa's decorations for the marriage of Vittorio Emanuele to Maria Adelaide of Austria (1842), as well as palazzi (Palazzo Reale in via Balbi, 1842), churches (San Donato, 1846), and gardens. He served as director of the school of ornament at the Accademia Ligustica from 1827 to 1867.
