= Castelletto di Branduzzo =

- Comune
- Comune di Castelletto di Branduzzo
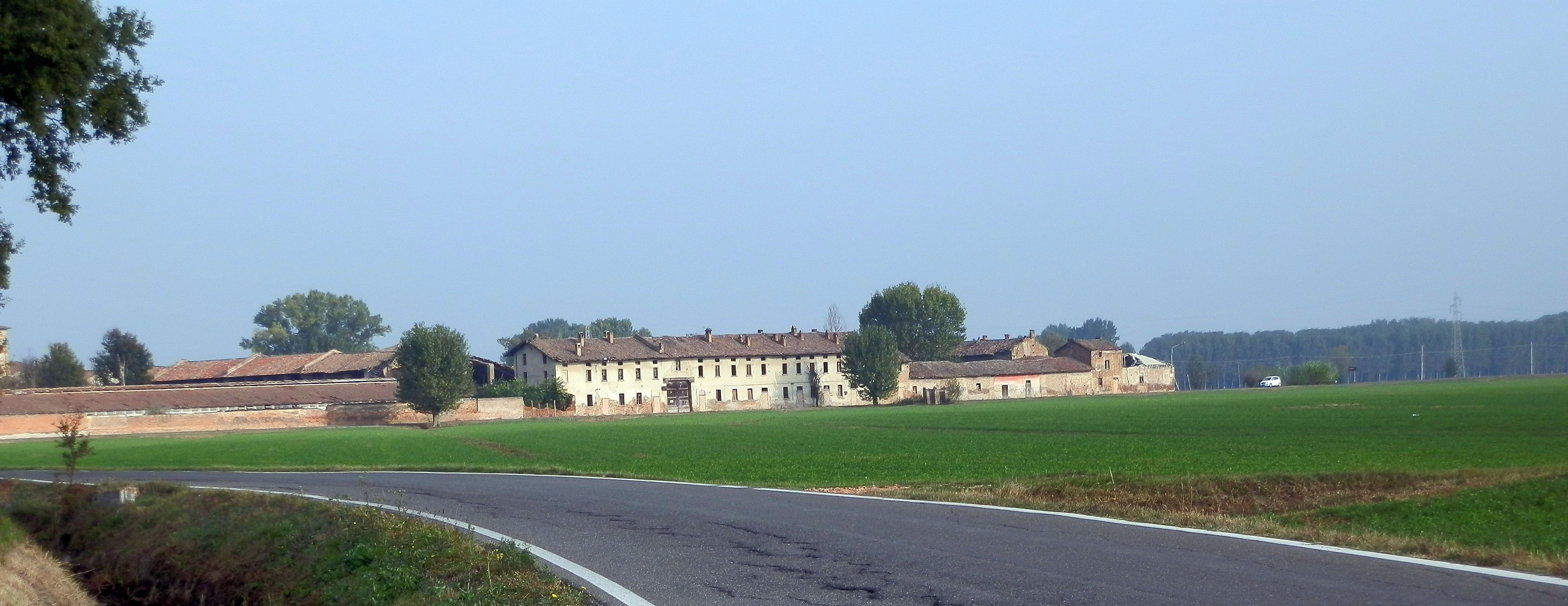

- Location within Italy Location within Lombardy
- Coordinates: 45°4′N 9°6′E
- Country: Italy
- Region: Lombardy
- Province: Pavia (PV)

Government
  - Mayor: Antonino Lo Verso

Area
  - Total: 11.77 km^{2} (4.54 sq mi)
- Elevation: 70 m (230 ft)

Population (30 June 2017)
  - Total: 1,022
  - Density: 86.83/km^{2} (224.9/sq mi)
- Demonym: Castellettesi
- Time zone: UTC+1 (CET)
  - Summer (DST): UTC+2 (CEST)
- Postal code: 27040
- Dialing code: 0383
- Website: Official website

Castelletto di Branduzzo is a comune (municipality) in the Province of Pavia in the Italian region Lombardy, located about 45 km (28 mi) south of Milan and about 14 km (8.7 mi) southwest of Pavia.

Castelletto di Branduzzo borders the following municipalities: Bastida Pancarana, Bressana Bottarone, Casatisma, Lungavilla, Pancarana, Pizzale, Verretto.
