= Robecco Pavese =

- Comune
- Comune di Robecco Pavese
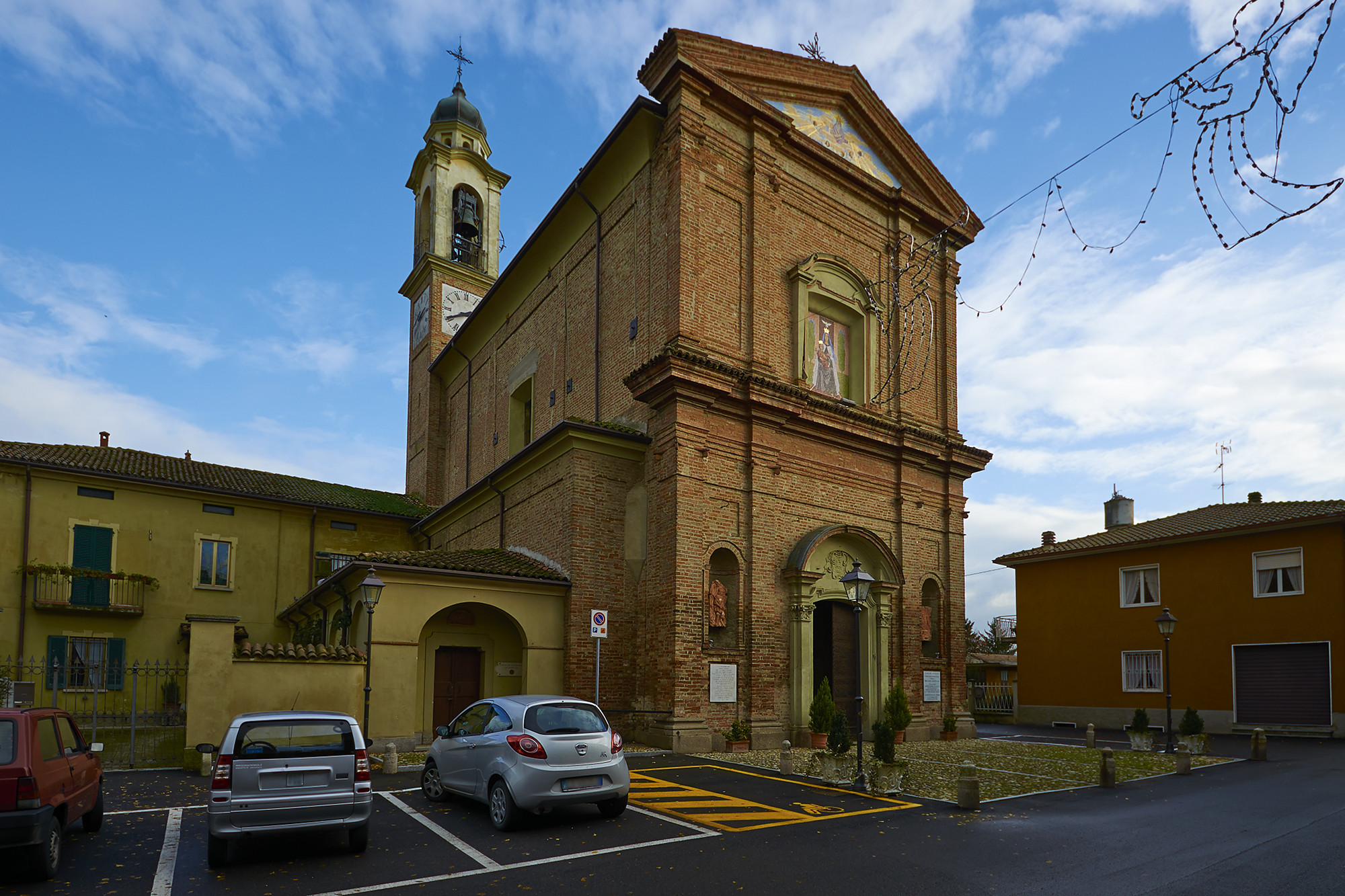
- Church of Madonna del Carmine.

- Coat of arms

- Location within Italy Location within Lombardy
- Coordinates: 45°3′N 9°9′E
- Country: Italy
- Region: Lombardy
- Province: Pavia (PV)
- Frazioni: Casa Chiodi, Stradellino

Government
  - Mayor: Pier Luigi Bianchi

Area
  - Total: 6.93 km^{2} (2.68 sq mi)
- Elevation: 75 m (246 ft)

Population (31 December 2014)
  - Total: 563
  - Density: 81.2/km^{2} (210/sq mi)
- Demonym: Robecchesi
- Time zone: UTC+1 (CET)
  - Summer (DST): UTC+2 (CEST)
- Postal code: 27040
- Dialing code: 0383
- Website: Official website

Robecco Pavese is a comune (municipality) in the Province of Pavia in the Italian region Lombardy, located in the Oltrepò Pavese about 45 km south of Milan and about 15 km south of Pavia.
