= Villa Gruber De Mari =

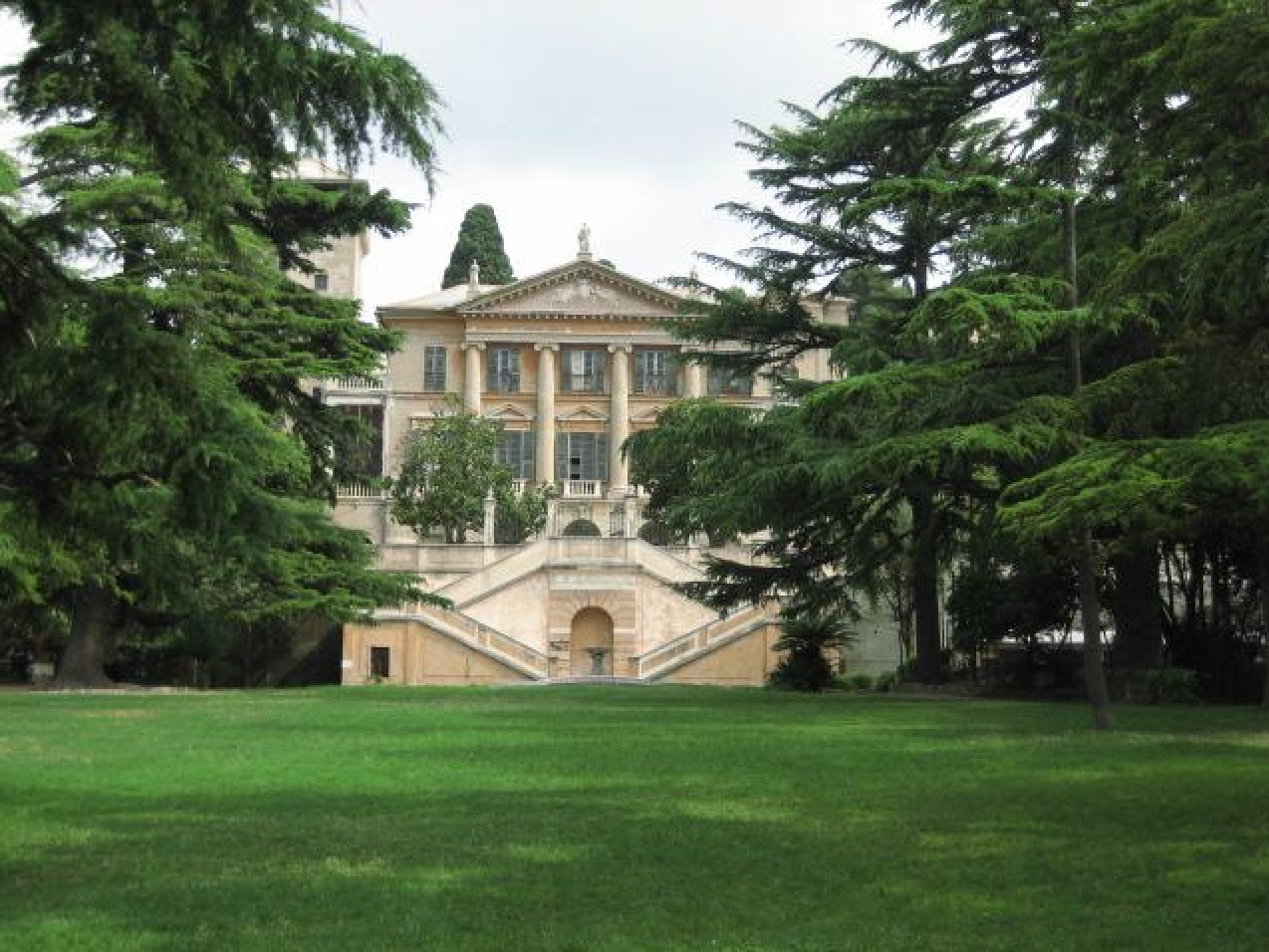
- The villa seen from the park
- Interactive map of the Villa Gruber De Mari area
- Former names: Villa De Mari

General information
- Status: In use
- Type: Villa
- Architectural style: Neoclassic
- Location: Corso Solferino, 27, Genoa, Italy
- Coordinates: 44.4152°N 8.9402°E
- Construction started: 16th century
- Completed: 19th century
- Client: De Mari family
- Owner: Municipality of Genoa

Villa Gruber De Mari was built by the noble Genoese family De Mari in the second half of the 16th century in the suburban area between the Sant'Anna and San Rocchino walkways linking the center of the city to the New Walls, in the Castelletto neighborhood of Genoa, Italy. The villa includes a 16th-century guard tower and the 17th-century former private chapel, now the Abbatial Church of Santa Maria della Sanità. The villa is located in a panoramic position within a large park, which has been opened to the public after the villa was acquired by the Municipality of Genoa in the 20th century.

== History ==
Built by the noble Genoese family De Mari in the second half of the 16th century, in 1664 the villa was the residence of the Doge of the Republic of Genoa Stefano De Mari (Stêva De Mâri in Ligurian language). The private chapel of Santa Maria della Sanità was added to the compound in the 17th century.

The building was modified several times. The current state was reached at the end of the 18th century, with the addition of the "Columns' Room" and the remake of the facade in the Neoclassical style. The facade is connected to the parc by two symmetrical stairways.

In 1856 the villa was sold to the Austrian businessman Adolf Gruber, who gave to the villa its current name. The Gruber family modified some internal features, but left the exterior untouched. At the beginning of the 20th century, an Art Nouveau annex was built in the garden. Around 1930, the villa was sold to a land developing firm called Perrone, which built a number of residential homes in the park. Later the villa and the remainder of the park were acquired by the Municipality of Genoa and have been destined to public fruition. For some years, the villa became the home of the Museo Americanistico Federico Lunardi, which has recently been relocated to the D'Albertis Castle nearby.

The villa is in poor state of conservation and is currently closed until renovation takes place. The park is well tended and remains open to the public. The Art Nouveau annex, also in poor state of conservation, is owned by the Carlo Felice Opera Theater. A lateral portion of the villa is still in use as the local station of the Military Police (Carabinieri).

== See also ==
- Abbatial church of Santa Maria della Sanità

== Bibliography ==
- Catalogo delle Ville Genovesi, Italia Nostra, Genova 1967, p. 99.
- F. Alizeri, Guida Artistica della Citta di Genova, Genova 1846, p. 1057.
- M.L. Levati, I dogi biennali dal 1528 al 1699, Genova 1930, p. 221.
