= Villa Madre Cabrini =

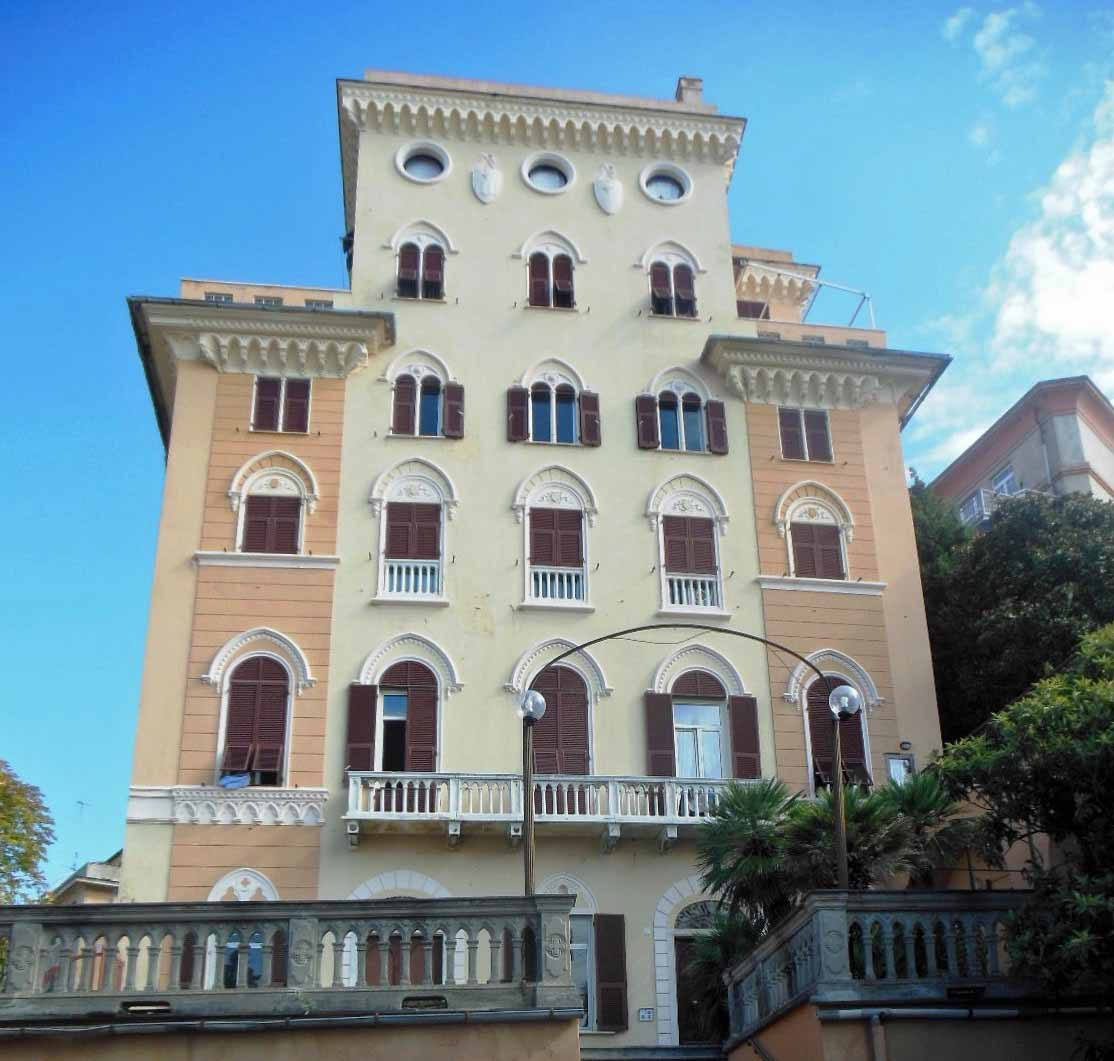
- Villa Madre Cabrini in the current eclectic-style appearance, 2016. The rationalist annex, now School San Paolo, is visible to the right of the main building.
- Interactive map of the Villa Madre Cabrini area
- Former names: Villa Acquarone; Palazzo Acquarone

General information
- Status: In use
- Type: Villa
- Architectural style: Gothic revival
- Location: Via Acquarone 22, 22A; Salita Bachernia 8, 10, 11, 12, Genoa, Italy
- Coordinates: 44.41626°N 8.93729°E
- Construction started: 17th century
- Completed: 20th century
- Owner: Main building: private apartments. Annex: School San Paolo

Technical details
- Floor count: 5

School San Paolo
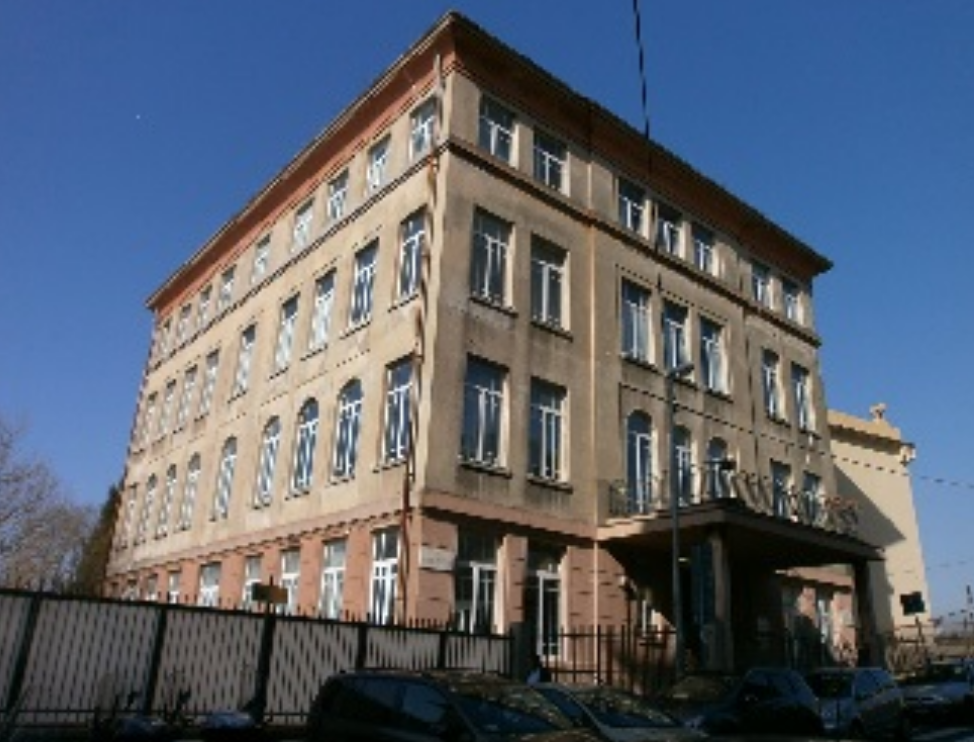
- Genova Castelletto; Italy

Information
- Former name: Scuola Madre Cabrini
- Type: Nursery, Primary, Secondary
- Established: 1894 by Saint Frances Xavier Cabrini M.S.C.
- School district: Castelletto, Genova
- Age range: 3–14

Villa Madre Cabrini, formerly Villa Acquarone, is a villa in the Castelletto quarter of Genoa, Liguria, Northwestern Italy. It is situated in a panoramic location on the hill of Bachernia, commanding open views over the Old City, the harbor and the Gulf of Genoa. Throughout its history, the villa has played an important role in the urban development and cultural life of the quarter. In the 18th century, it was one of the first suburban villas built in the old hamlet of Bachernia, giving impulse to the urbanization of the area. Then the property of the noble Acquarone family, the villa and its owner, Pietro Acquarone, II Count d'Acquarone, were in the 19th century at the heart of establishment of the economically and culturally active via Acquarone neighborhood.

In 1890, the villa was the birthplace of Pietro d'Acquarone, IV Count e I Duke d'Acquarone, the future Brigade General, businessman, Senator of the Kingdom of Italy and, most importantly, Minister to the Royal Household of the Kingdom of Italy under Victor Emmanuel III from 1939 to 1944, in which capacity he played a major role in the downfall of Benito Mussolini on July 25th, 1943.

In the early 20th century, the villa was sold by the Acquarone family to the Missionary Sisters of the Sacred Heart of Jesus and it became a renowned educational and cultural center. The boarding school established in Genoa in 1894 by Saint Frances Xavier Cabrini M.S.C was transferred there in 1917.

Today the main building has been reconverted to residential use, while the educational activity continues in the annex built in 1934–38, known as the public School San Paolo.

== History ==
=== The beginnings ===
The original part of the villa, dating to the early 17th century as the maps of the period, as well as the vaulted entrance and the decorated ceilings of the piano nobile suggest, was built as a suburban villa near the 16th century church of Saint Anne, alongside the steep walkway (Italian: salita; Ligurian: crêuza) linking Portello to Mura delle Chiappe, midway in between the Barbarossa Walls and the 17-century New Walls, giving impulse to the urbanization of an area that used to be rural at the time. The area was called Bachernia, a phytonym indicating the presence of berries ("bacche" in Ligurian and Italian language).

=== The Nineteenth Century and the Acquarone family ===
In the 19th century, the property of the aristocratic Acquarone family, the villa was enriched and elevated with the addition of a fourth story, and was then known as "Villa Acquarone" or "Palazzo Acquarone", still surrounded by a large park, part of which was landscaped and part used for dairy farming. The milk produced was sold in the historical "vaccheria" (dairy shop) located near the uphill station of the Sant'Anna funicular in via Agostino Bertani, an important contribution to the life of the neighborhood as the area surrounding Genoa was not suitable for dairy farming and milk had to be imported.

In the last decade of the century, the villa and its owner, Pietro Acquarone, II Count d'Acquarone, played a key role in the establishment of the economically and culturally active Via Acquarone neighborhood, to the north of the 19th-century Circonvallazione a Monte (Italian for "mountain ringway"), which reduced the size of the park to make way to the edification of low-rise residential buildings in the newly constructed Corso Paganini. Urban expansion to the north of Ponte Caffaro, however, could not take place without the edification at the lower end of the park of the villa of a high wall to support the access road, a risky undertaking for the technology of the time. Pietro Acquarone decided to take action and obtained permission from the Municipality to build the wall at his sole risk, then transferred the property of the wall – and the associated risks – to the Municipality five years later.

At turn of 20th century, the villa received its current appearance under the supervision of Luigi Filippo d'Acquarone, III Count d'Acquarone, with the addition of the fifth story and the remodeling of the facade in the Gothic Revival and Eclectic styles popular in Genoa at the time.

In 1890, the villa was the birthplace of Pietro d'Acquarone, I Duke d'Acquarone, who ended a successful military career in 1924 with the active rank of Brigade General, became a businessman, Senator of the Kingdom of Italy and, most importantly, Minister to the Royal Household under Victor Emmanuel III of Italy from 1939 to 1944, in which capacity he played a major role in the downfall of Benito Mussolini on July 25th, 1943.

=== The Twentieth Century and the School Madre Cabrini ===
In 1917, the villa was purchased by the Missionary Sisters of the Sacred Heart of Jesus founded by Saint Frances Xavier Cabrini M.S.C (1850–1917), the Italian-American "missionary of the emigrants", who died in the United States in the same year. The Sisters renamed the building "Villa Madre Cabrini" to honor their saint foundress and turned it into a renowned educational and cultural center, transferring there the boarding school established by the Saint Mother Cabrini in via Palestro in 1894.

The educational complex was expanded in 1934–38 with the edification of a rationalist annex connected to the villa though an underground passage under Salita Bachernia commissioned by Sister Francesca Saverio Savona M.S.C. (1897–1950), who directed the school from 1931 until 1950. Sister Savona also supervised the restoration of the damage suffered by the villa during World War II.

=== Recent history and the School San Paolo ===
In the 1980s, the villa and the remainder of its park were sold and redeveloped into residential apartments. The annex and the portion of the park to the East of Salita Bachernia are currently in use as a public school, known as School San Paolo, with access from via Francesca Saverio Cabrini, next to the Elevator Magenta-Crocco. The school now hosts the Istituto Comprensivo Castelletto, including a Nursery School (Scuola dell'Infanzia), a Primary School (Scuola Elementare) and a Secondary School (Scuola Secondaria di Primo Grado).

== Bibliography ==
- Rinaldo Luccardini, La Circonvallazione a Monte. Genova. Storia dell'espansione urbana dell'Ottocento, SAGEP 2012, ISBN 978-88-6373-196-5
- Tomaso Pastorino, Dizionario delle strade di Genova, Tolozzi 1968.
- Corinna Praga, Andar per creuse. Oltre il centro storico vol.2. Itinerari dal Portello, dal Vico della Croce Bianca e da Via Balbi verso la Porta delle Chiappe, ERGA 2016, ISBN 8881639335.

== Gallery ==
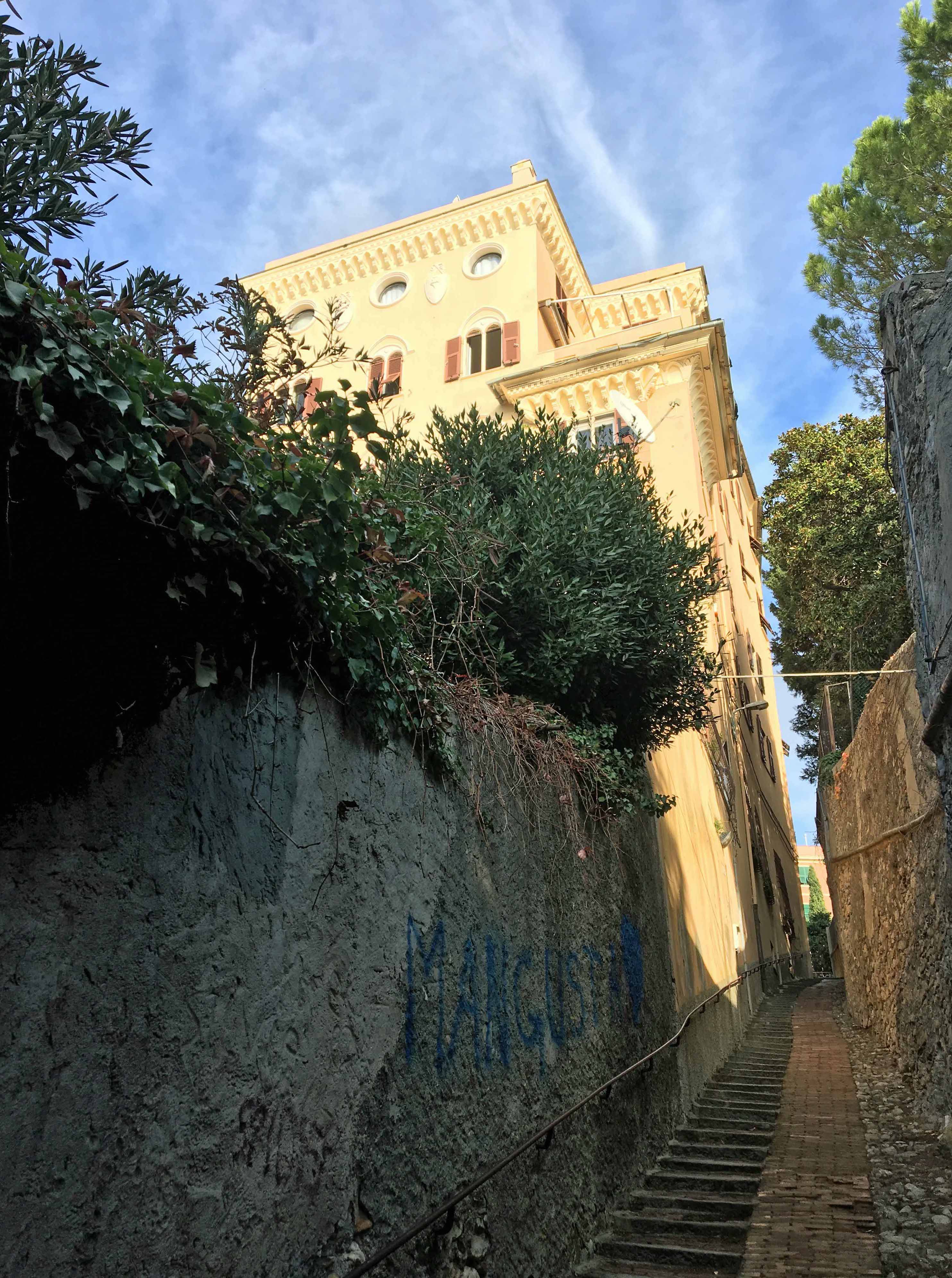
Villa Madre Cabrini seen from Salita Bachernia

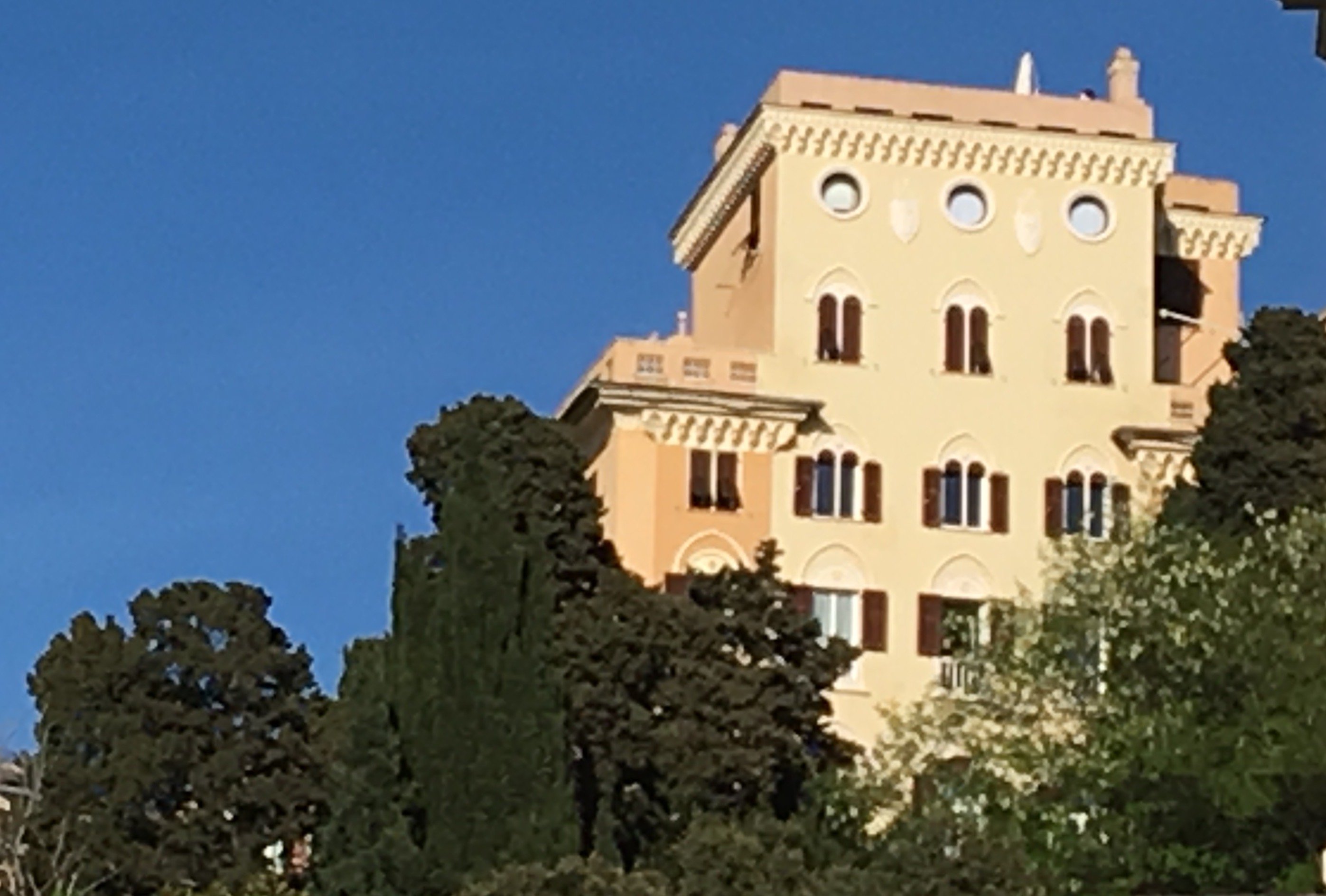
Villa Madre Cabrini seen from Corso Paganini

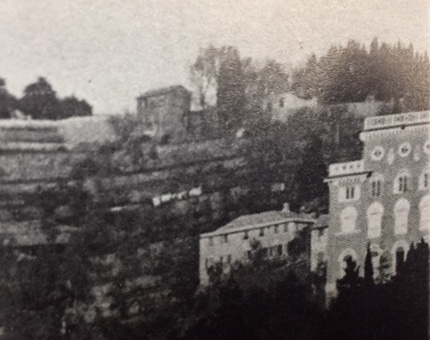
Villa Madre Cabrini seen from Corso Paganini, 1890. The fourth story was already added, the fifth story is still missing

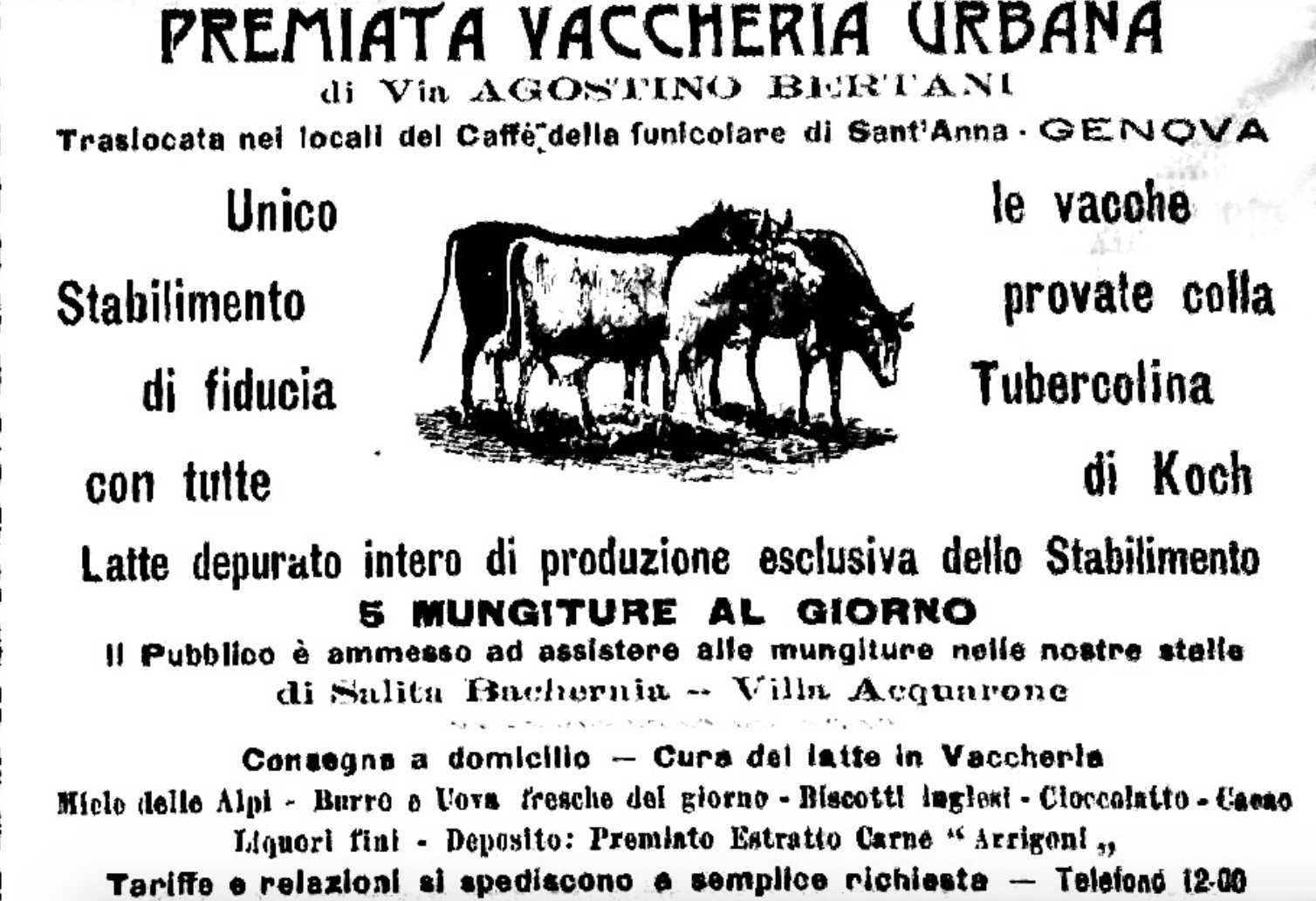
Advertisement of the "Vaccheria" near the Sant'Anna Funicolar, selling the milk produced in the dairy farm hosted in the park of Villa Acquarone, now Villa Madre Cabrini

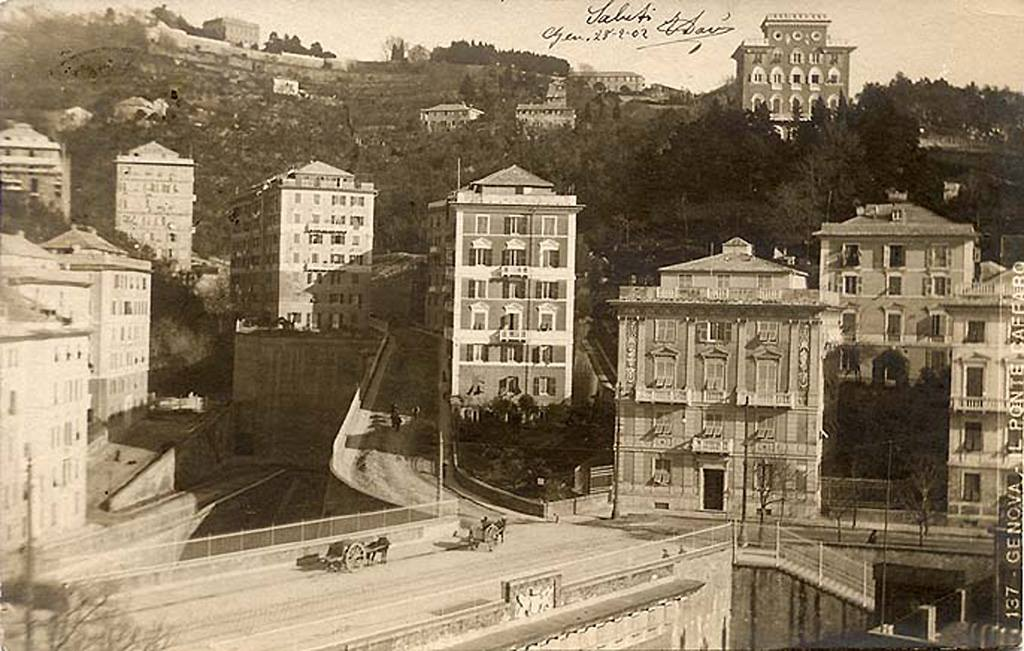
Villa Madre Cabrini, top right, seen from Ponte Caffaro in 1900

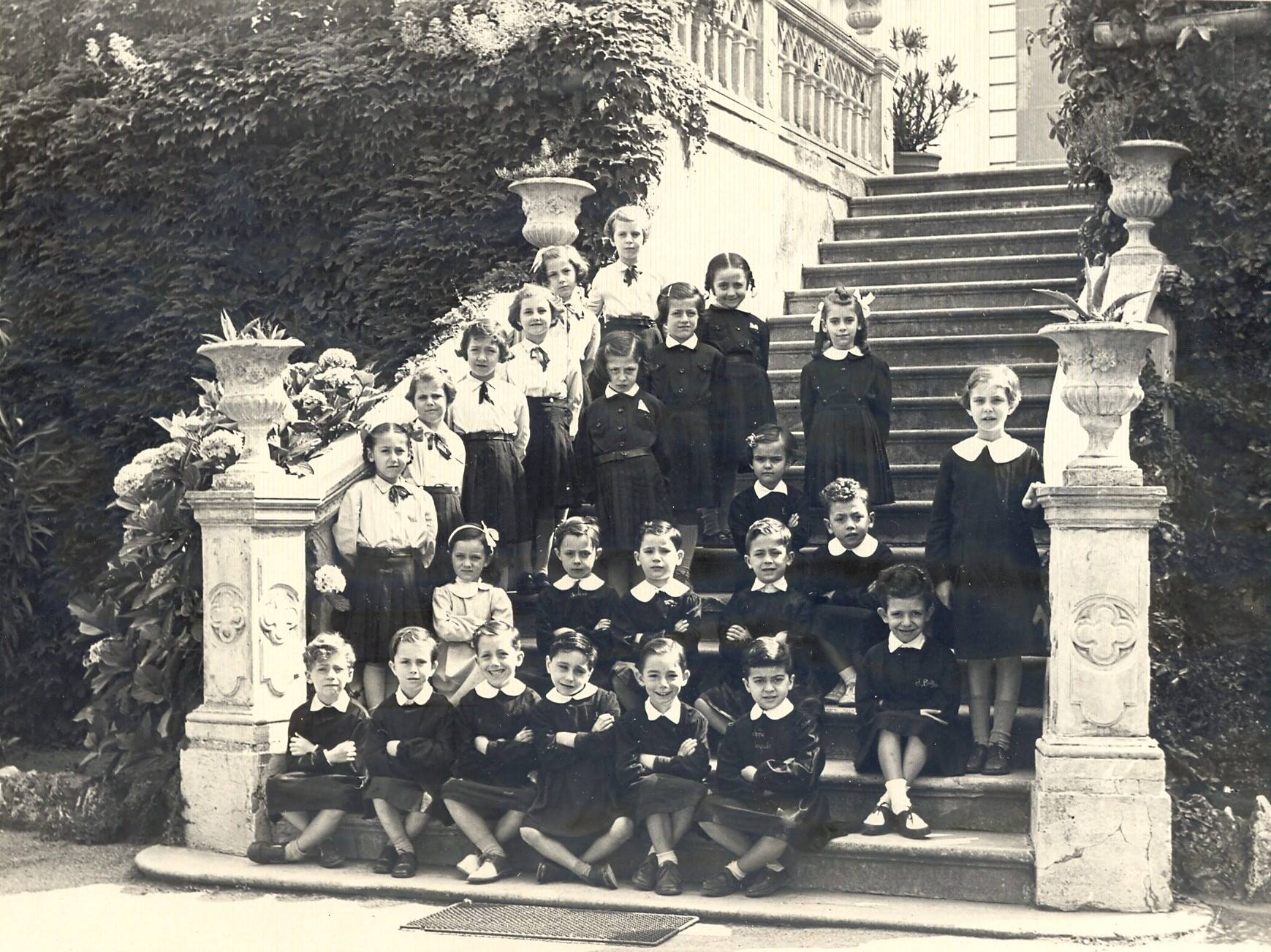
Pupils on the steps of Villa Madre Cabrini in the first half of the 20th century

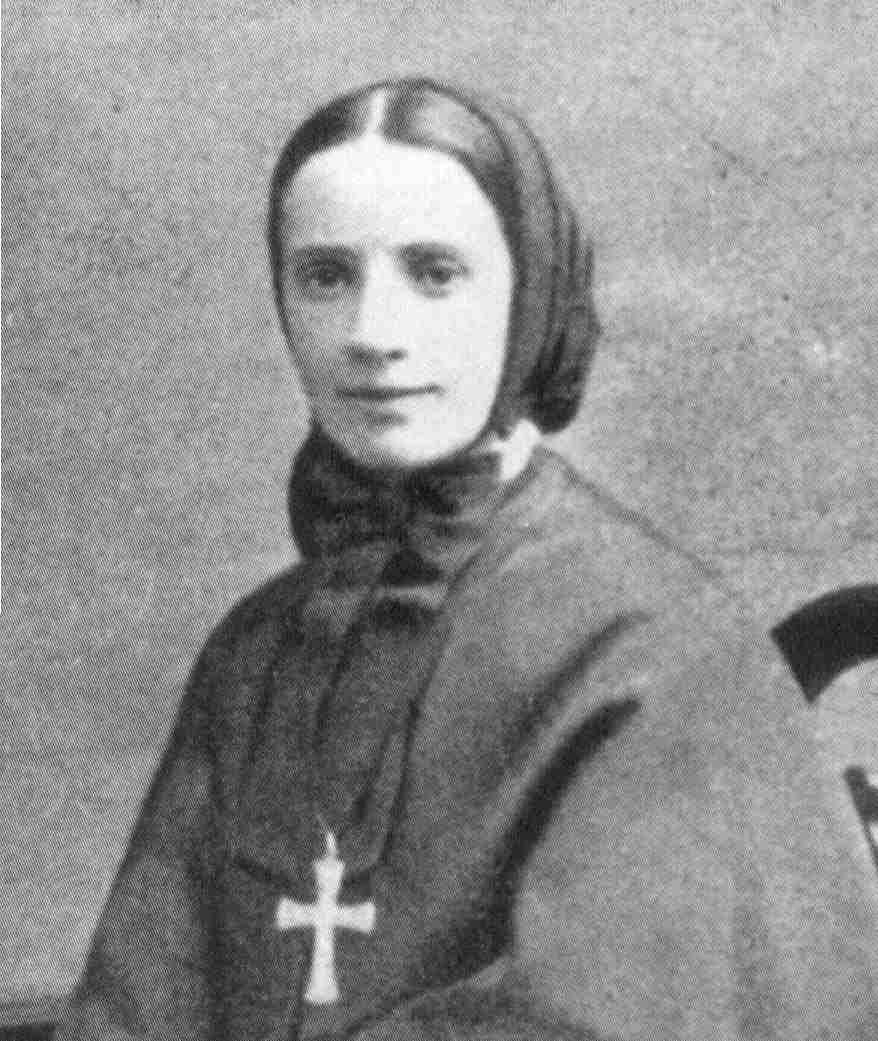
Saint Francis Xavier Cabrini M.S.C., who established the boarding school in Genoa in 1894

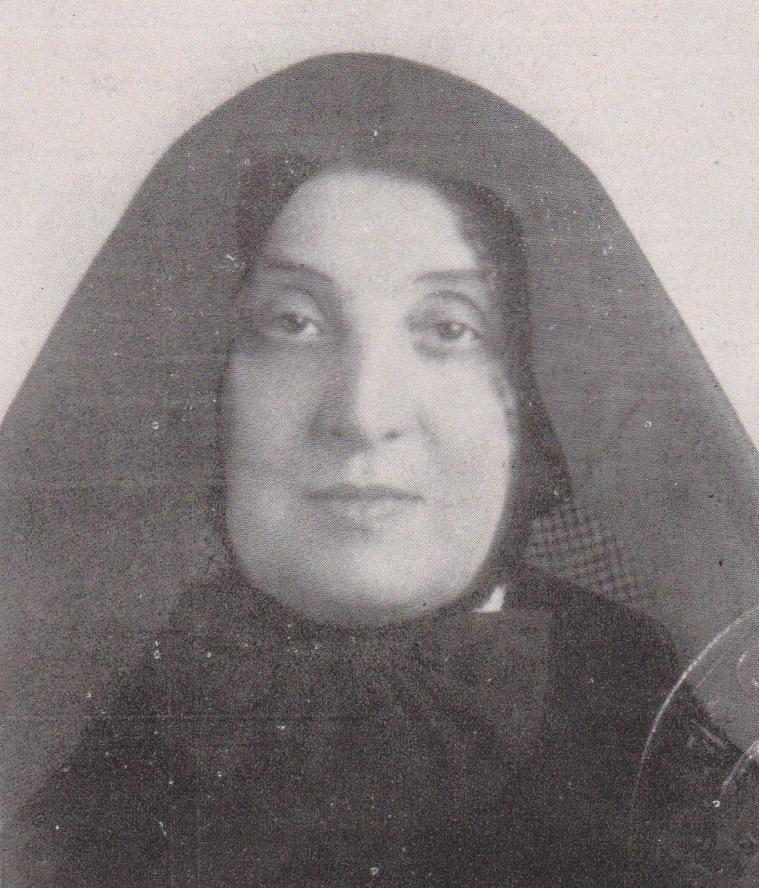
Sister Francesca Saverio Savona, who directed the boarding school at Villa Madre Cabrini from 1931 to 1950

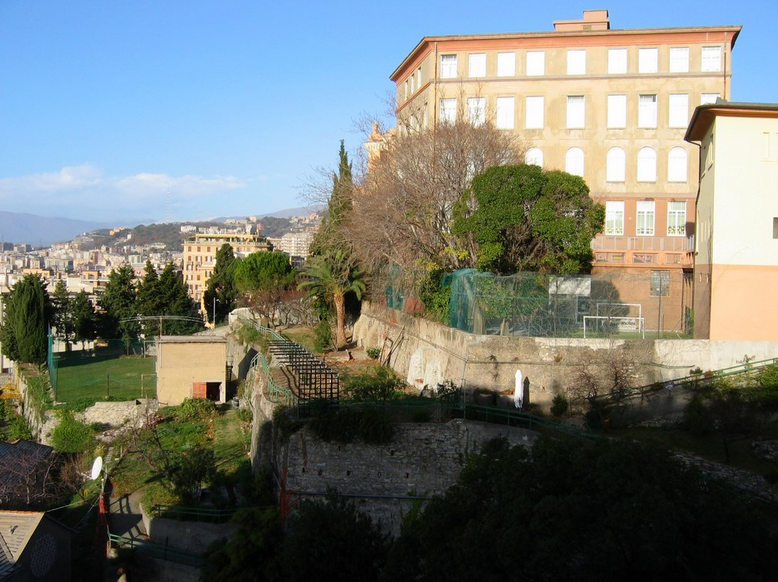
The rationalist annex to the villa, still in use today as Scuola San Paolo
