= Abbatial church of Santa Maria della Sanità (Genoa) =

Church building in Genoa, Italy

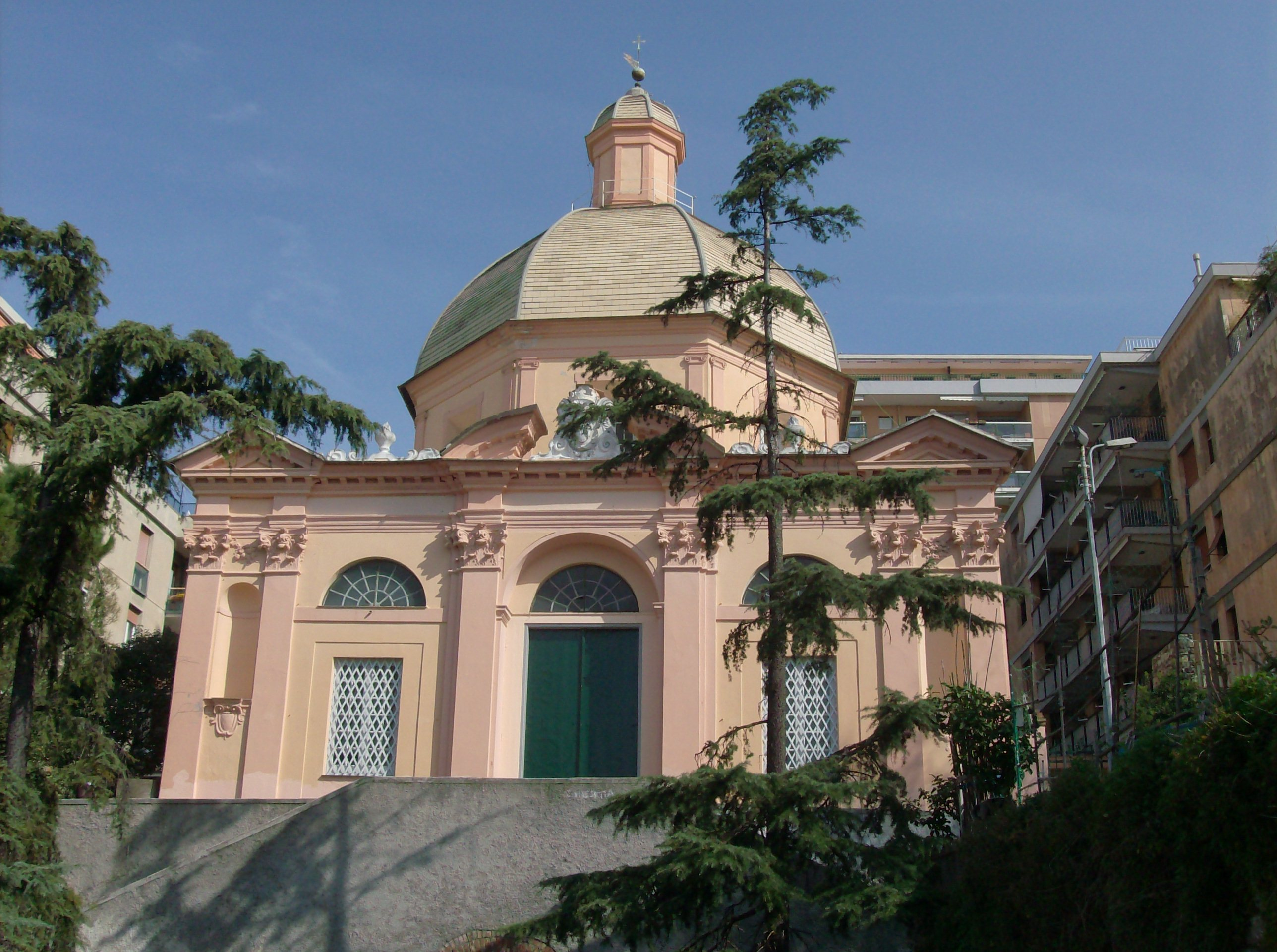
- The façade of the church.

Religion
- Affiliation: Roman Catholic
- Province: Genoa

Location
- Location: Genoa, Italy
- Interactive map of Abbatial church of Santa Maria della Sanità
- Coordinates: 44°24′58″N 8°56′24″E

Architecture
- Type: Church
- Groundbreaking: 17th Century
- Completed: 17th Century

The abbatial church of Santa Maria della Sanità is located in Salita di Santa Maria della Sanità, in the Castelletto quarter of Genoa. Originally, it was the private chapel of villa De Mari (now villa Grüber). It was built in the 17th century by the Genoese nobleman Stefano De Mari, who bestowed it to the Descalced Carmelites of the nearby Church of Sant'Anna. It has a rare octagonal layout, a wide cupola and seven lateral chapels, which make it a jewel of the religious architecture of Genoa.

== Bibliography ==
- Catalogo delle Ville Genovesi, Italia Nostra, 1967
- Guida d'Italia, Liguria, Touring Club Italiano, 2009

== See also ==
- Villa Gruber de Mari
- Sant'Anna, Genoa
- Castelletto
- Genoa
