= Antica Farmacia Sant'Anna =

Antica Farmacia Sant’Anna
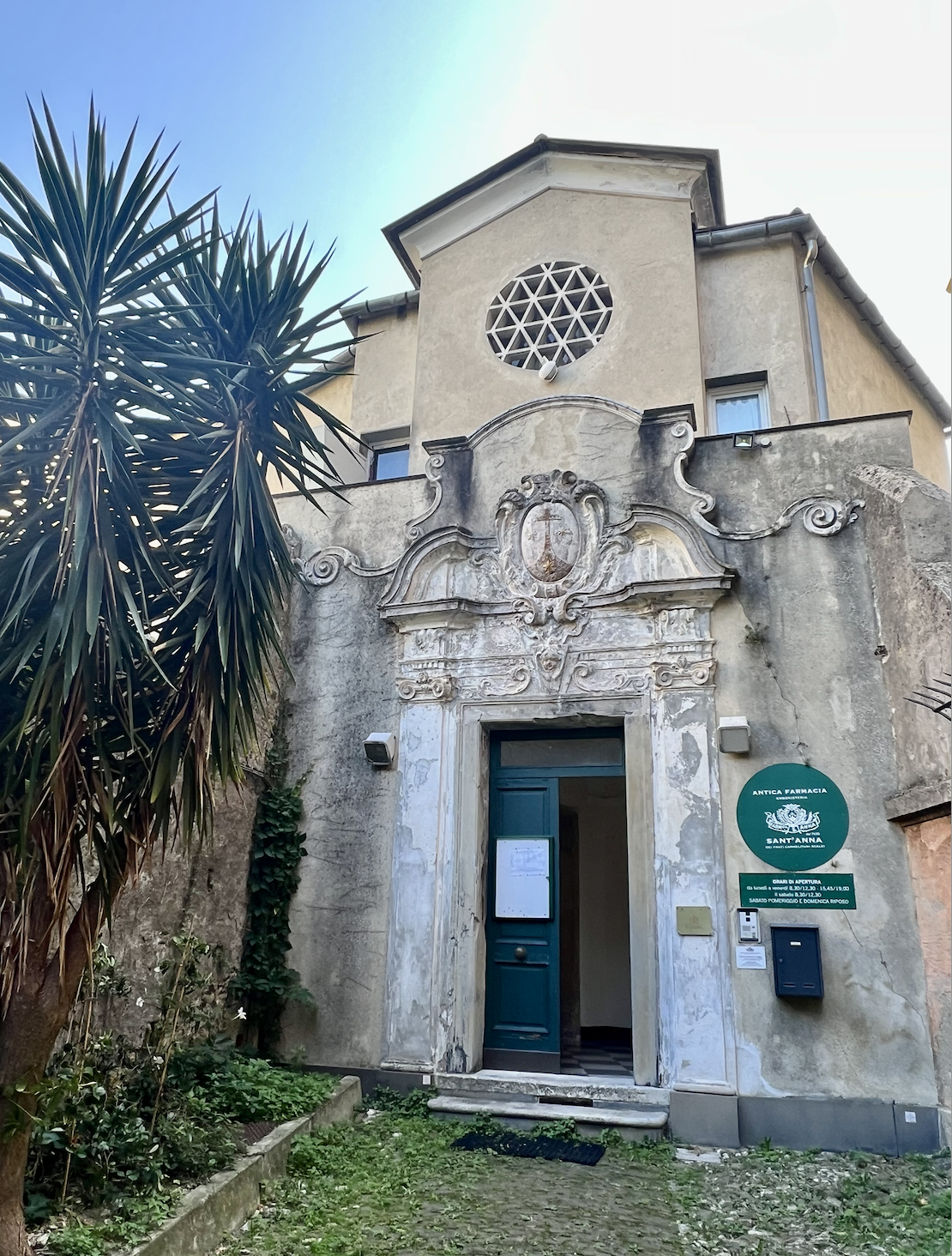
- Industry: Pharmaceutical
- Founded: 1650
- Founders: Discalced Carmelites
- Headquarters: Italy
- Products: Medicines, herbal medicine products, lotions, cosmetics and food supplements
- Website: https://www.erboristeriadeifrati.it/

The Antica Farmacia Sant'Anna (Italian for “Ancient Pharmacy of Saint Anne”) is a pharmacy and herbal medicine dispensary in Genoa, Italy, located in the quarter of Castelletto. Founded by the Discalced Carmelites friars of the annex Convent of Sant’Anna in 1650, it is the oldest commercial establishment still operating in Genoa and the only instance in Italy of a fully licensed pharmacy owned and operated by a religious institution. While its ancient furniture and instruments are listed and protected as cultural heritage, its modern laboratories are equipped with state-of-the-art technology for the preparation of medicines, Galenic formulations, herbal medicine products, lotions, cosmetics and dietary supplements under the supervision of legally qualified personnel.

== History ==
=== The origins ===
The Convent of Sant’Anna is the first foundation of the Discalced Carmelites outside of Spain, established in 1584 under the impulse of father Nicolas of Jesus and Mary Doria, a descendant of the prominentDoria family. Returned from Spain twenty years after the reformation of the Carmelite Order operated by Saint Theresa of Avila and Saint John of the Cross, Father Doria established a monastery in his native city with the financial support of the noble families Doria, Cattaneo, Spinola e Pallavicini.

Soon after the foundation of the convent, the friars opened the pharmacy. At the end of the 16th century, one of the cloisters of the convent, presently known as 'the Cloister of the Roses', was used for the cultivation of curative herbs. Potatoes imported from the Americas were planted there for the very first time on Italian soil, after the founder Father Doria had seen them at the court of Philip II King of Spain.

=== The 17th century ===
In the 17th century, noble and wealthy citizens usually resorted to a medical doctor in case of illness, while the underprivileged layers of society would usually seek medical support from religious institutions. By the mid-century Sant'Anna likely had a high influx of patients: testimony thereof is the construction of a large wing dedicated to the preparation and dispensation of medicines, separate from the friar's quarters.

The oldest document mentioning the pharmacy, dated 1650, is stored at the Vatican Apostolic Archives. Another document, dated 1652 and stored in the archives of the Convent of Sant'Anna, shows that the chief chemist, brother Martino of Saint Anthony (1638–1721), would "go out every day to procure the ingredients for the medications [...], many patients came to him and not everyone could be healed in the same way [...], hence it was necessary to prepare different potions, medicines, and poultices".

=== The 18th century ===
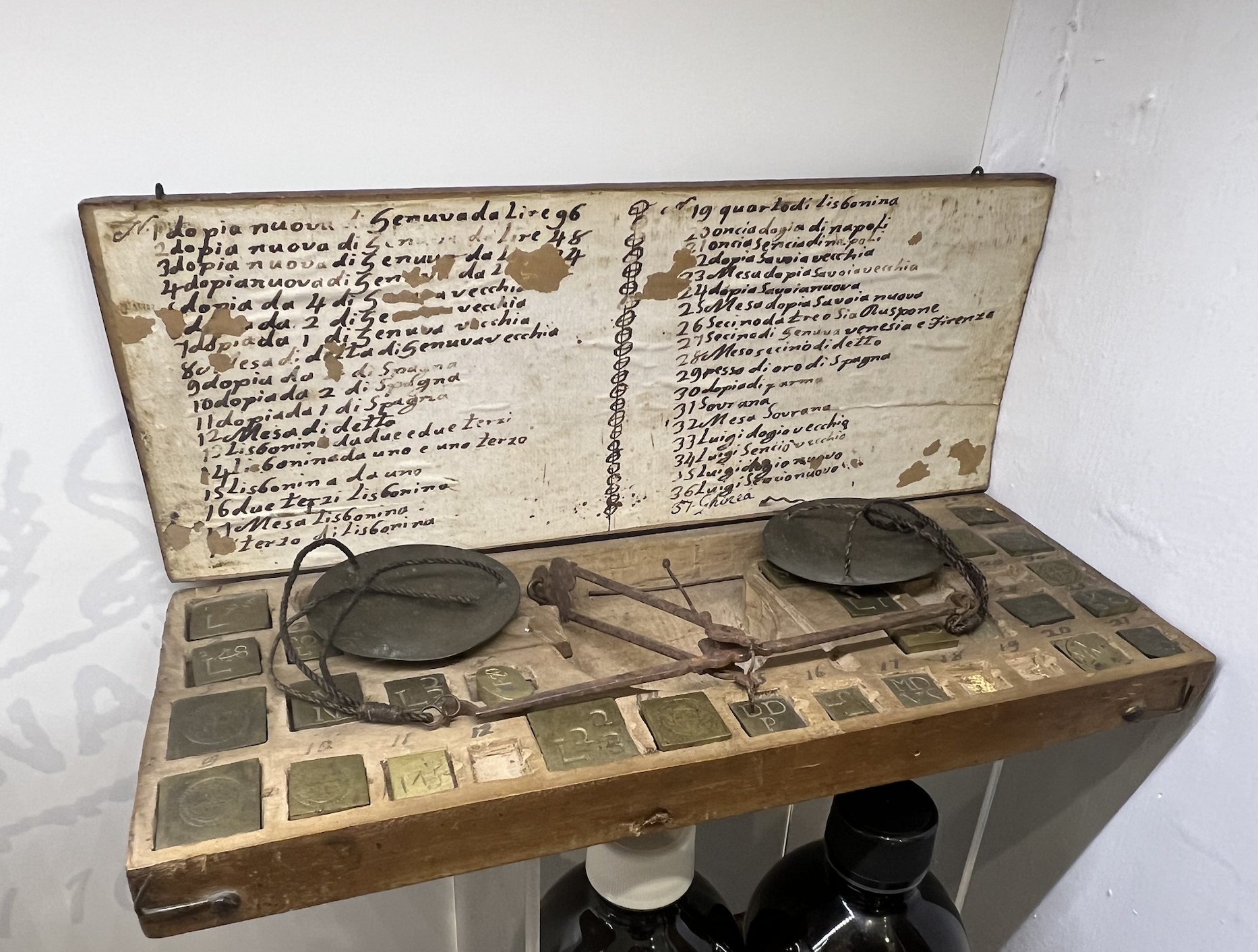
Ancient scale using known coins weight to determine the weight, once used at the Antica Farmacia Sant'Anna in Genoa

According to the historical registers of the pharmacy, a contract redacted in 1778 mentions that the Genoese surgeon and chemist Lorenzo Robello was tasked to procure ingredients for the pharmacy, prepare the medicines and administer them "to the friars and to external patients". At that time it was not possible to find a friar with the necessary qualifications; the resolve of the Carmelite Order, however, remained that the pharmacy was to be run primarily by friars and, by 1792, the fully-qualified chemist friar Giovanni della Croce assumed the direction of the pharmacy, updated its equipment and furnished the dispensary room with the boiserie which is still visible today.

=== The 19th century ===
After the annexation of the Republic of Genoa to the Kingdom of Sardinia at the beginning of the 19th century, the pharmacy was further refurbished by brother Bernardino di Sant'Anna.

In those years, the Pharmacy started a cooperation with the famous Parisian surgeon Louis Le Roy, author of the treatise Healing Medicine, a.k.a. Purgation, translated in Italian for the first time in Bologna in 1824. Although its content was later superseded by improvement in scientific research, the treatise enjoyed a great success at the time and was reprinted several times. A Genoese reprint in 1885 mentioned the cooperation with Sant'Anna's pharmacy in the back cover.

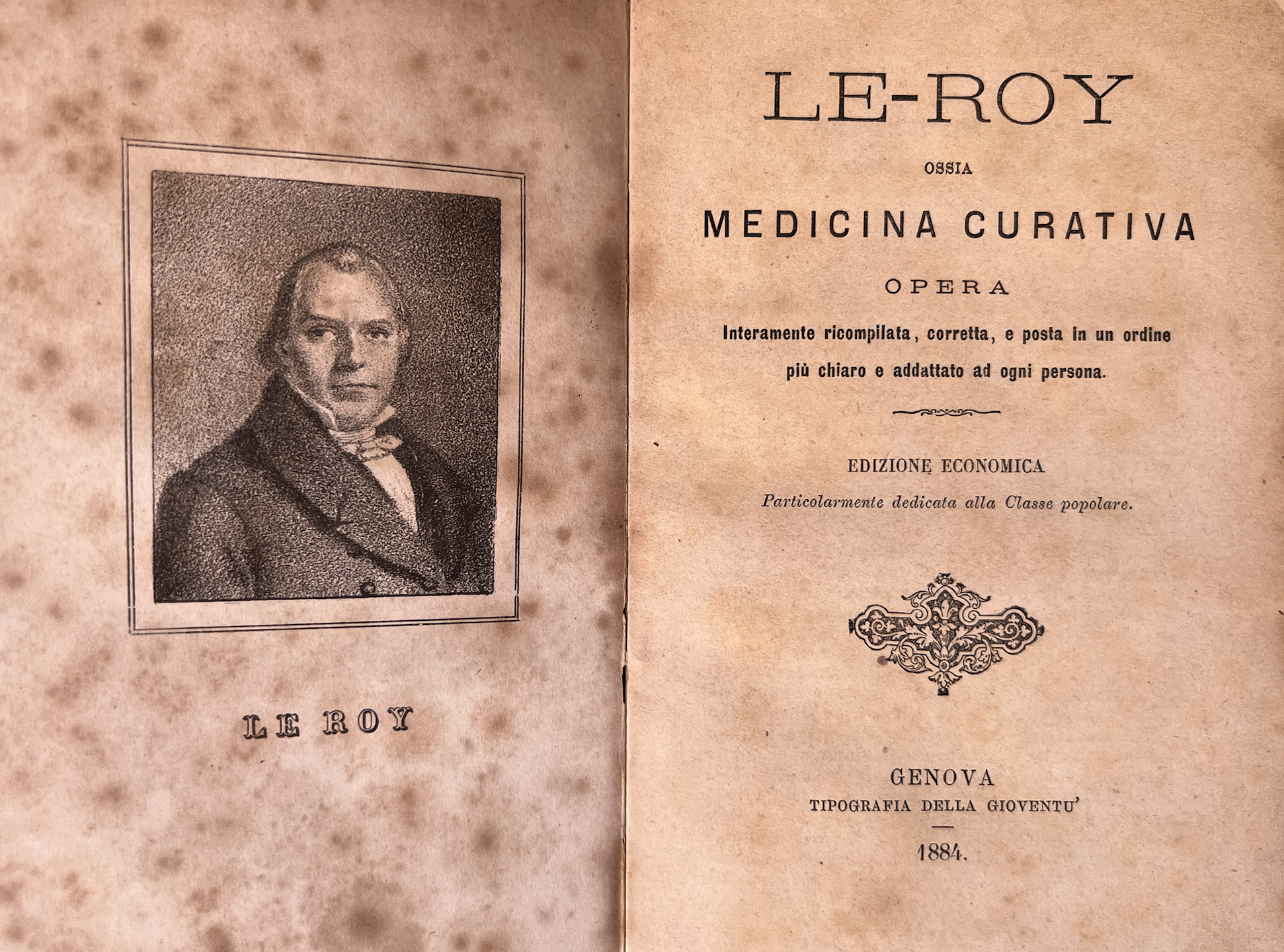
Cover page of Louis Le Roy, Medicina curativa, Genoa 1885

A document stored in the library of the Convent shows that brother Modesto, whose lay name was Stefano Montabone, received his diploma of chemist in 1840, granting him permission to practice his profession in Genoa and all other territories of the Kingdom of Sardinia in accordance to letter patents issued by King Victor Emmanuel I of Savoy. In 1882, however, the difficulties in securing chemist friars with appropriate legal qualifications appeared insurmountable. Therefore, keen to remain licensed according to the law, the Convent of Sant'Anna decided to enact a compromise solution and appointed a lay chemist "to ensure the regular preparation and administration of the medicines", while the business administration of the pharmacy remained entrusted to a friar.

At the end of the 19th century, the pharmacy had several prominent clients, including the main hospital of Genoa, the hospital of Pammatone. At the time, the most sought after products were white sugar, quinine, English salts, cinnamomum, rosolio, poppyseed oil, medicines against parasites and a medicine against demodicosis.

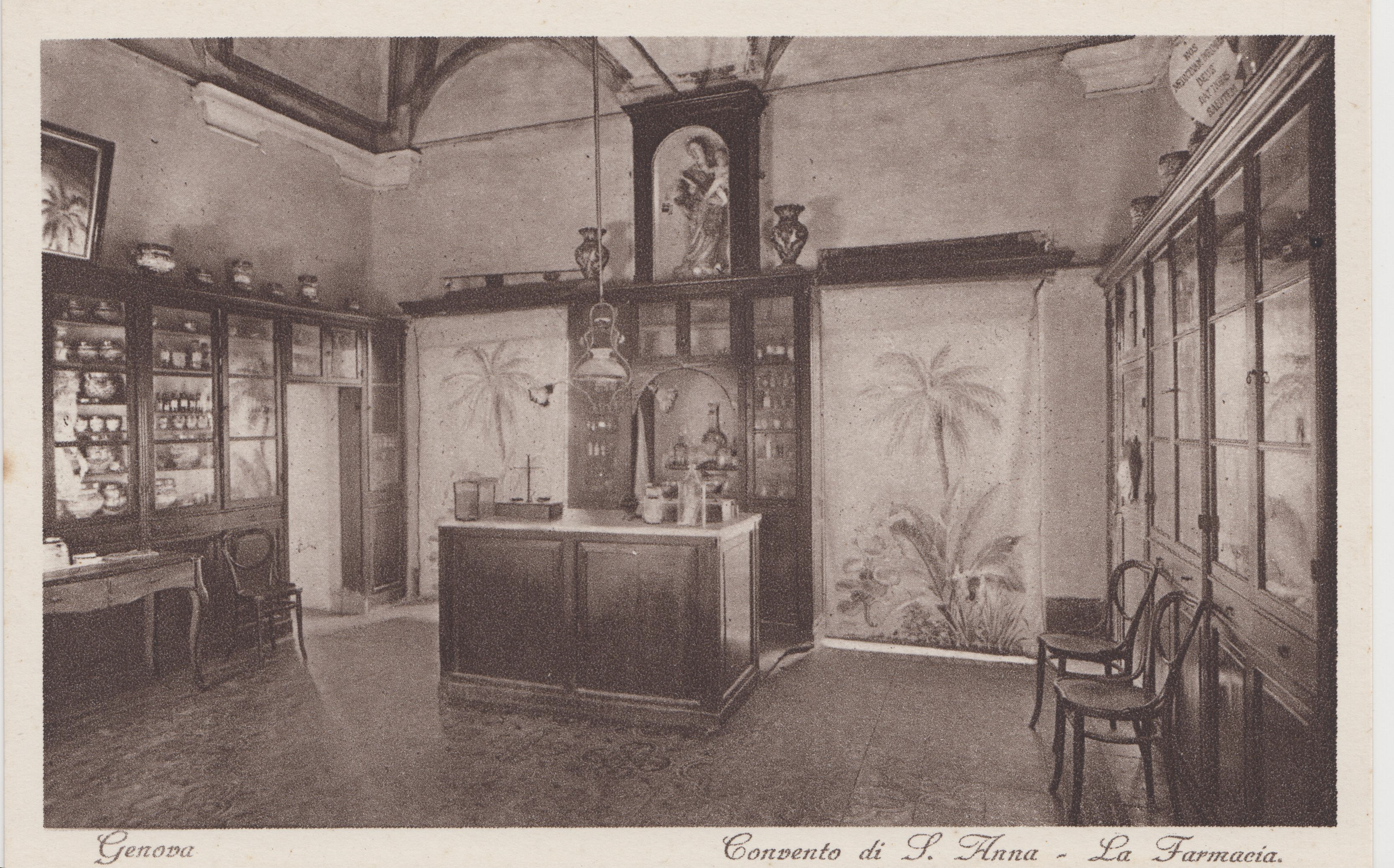
Ancient photo of the pharmacy

=== The 20th and 21st centuries ===
At the end of the 19th century, the construction of the wealthy neighborhood of Circonvallazione a Monte significantly altered the area, when Corso Magenta and the Sant'Anna funicular were built immediately to the South of the convent. The religious buildings and the quaint village in which they are located have nonetheless remained intact and quiet to this day.

The Pharmacy is still active today. Several ancient recipes are still prepared and updated when necessary. The laboratories have been refurbished to reflect modern needs and the latest regulatory requirements.

After 1933, the Convent, the church and the pharmacy of Sant'Anna are accessible also with an elevator from the tunnel which connects Corso Magenta with the Elevator Magenta-Crocco.

== Gallery ==
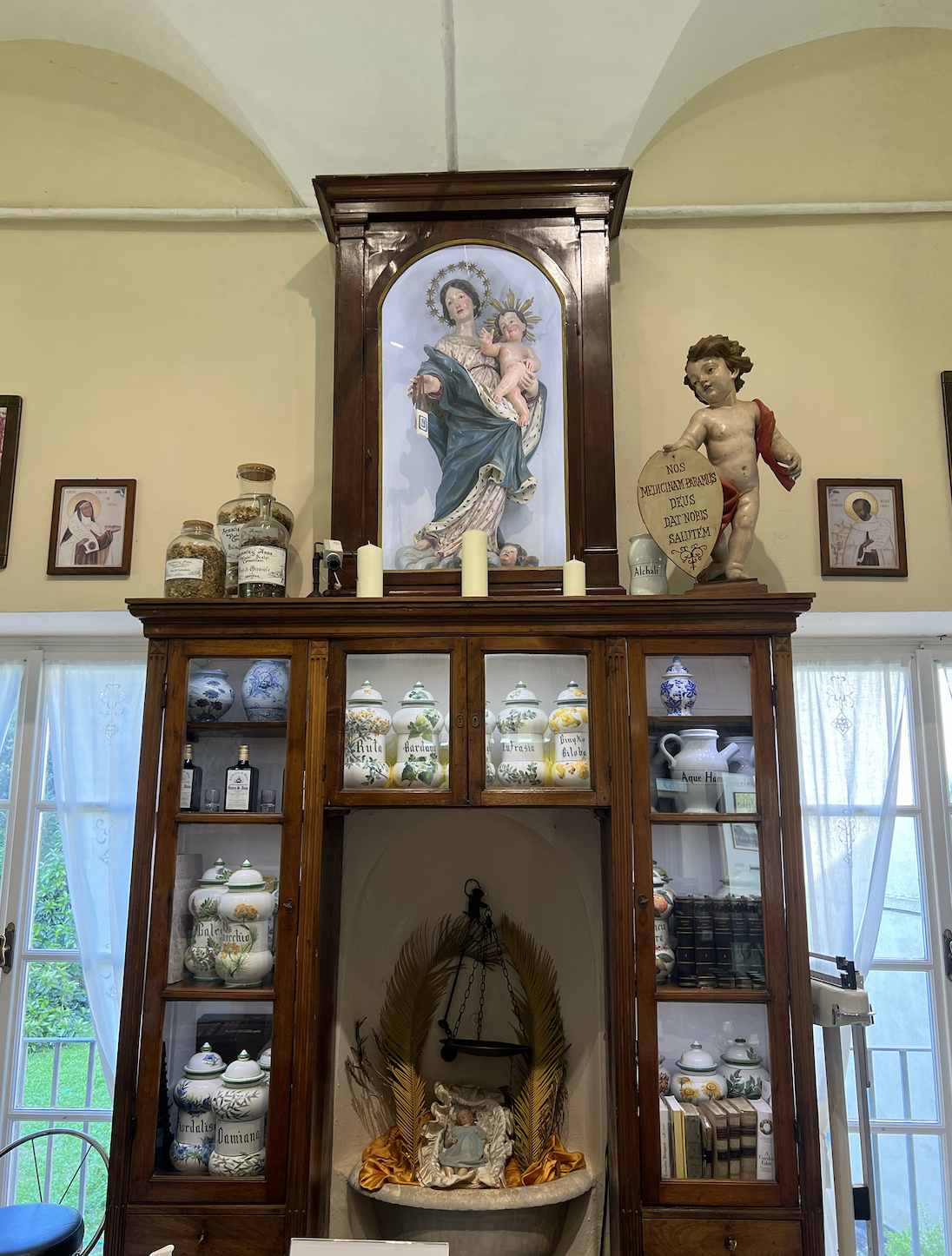
Interior (2023)

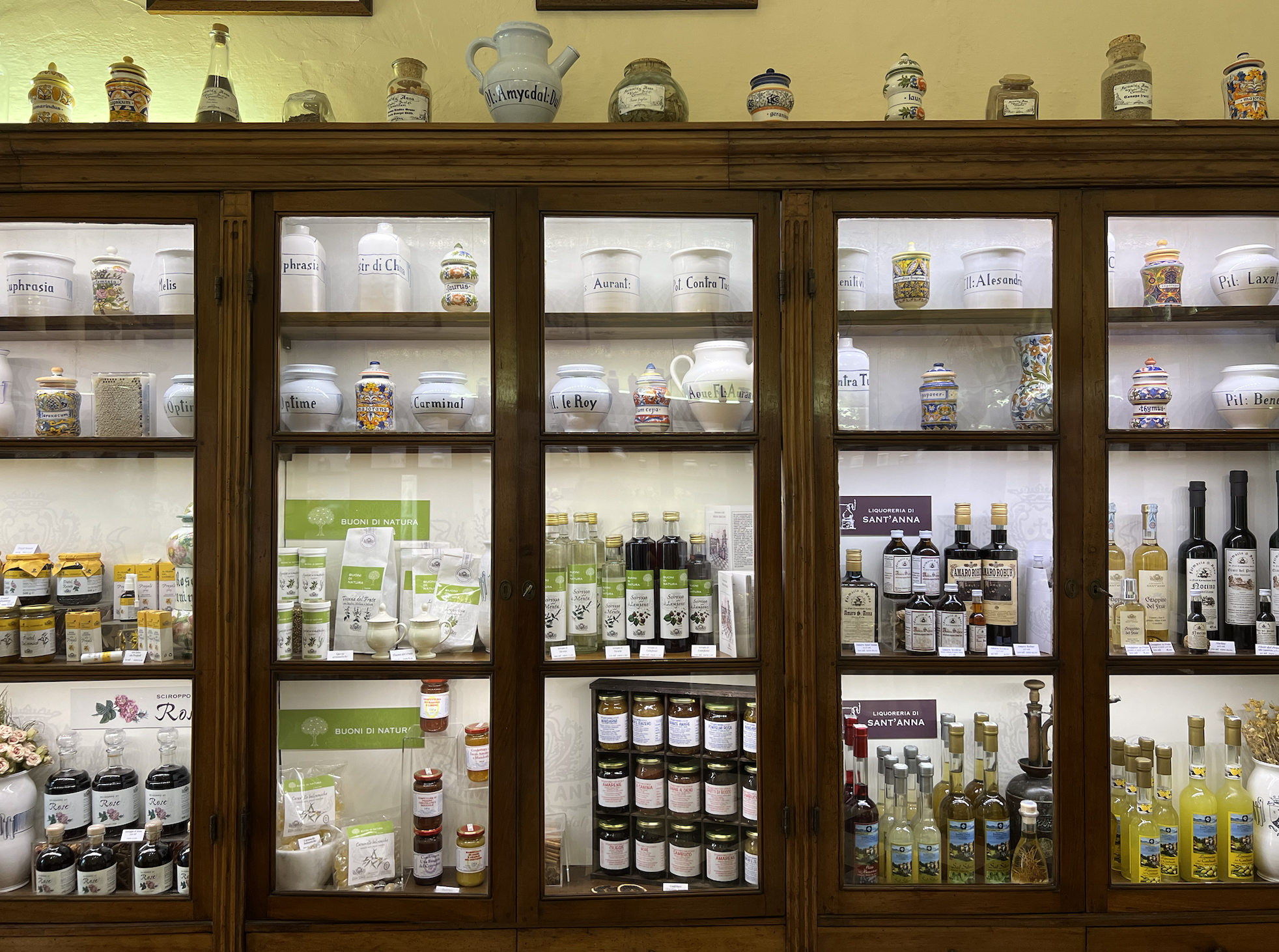
Interior (2023)

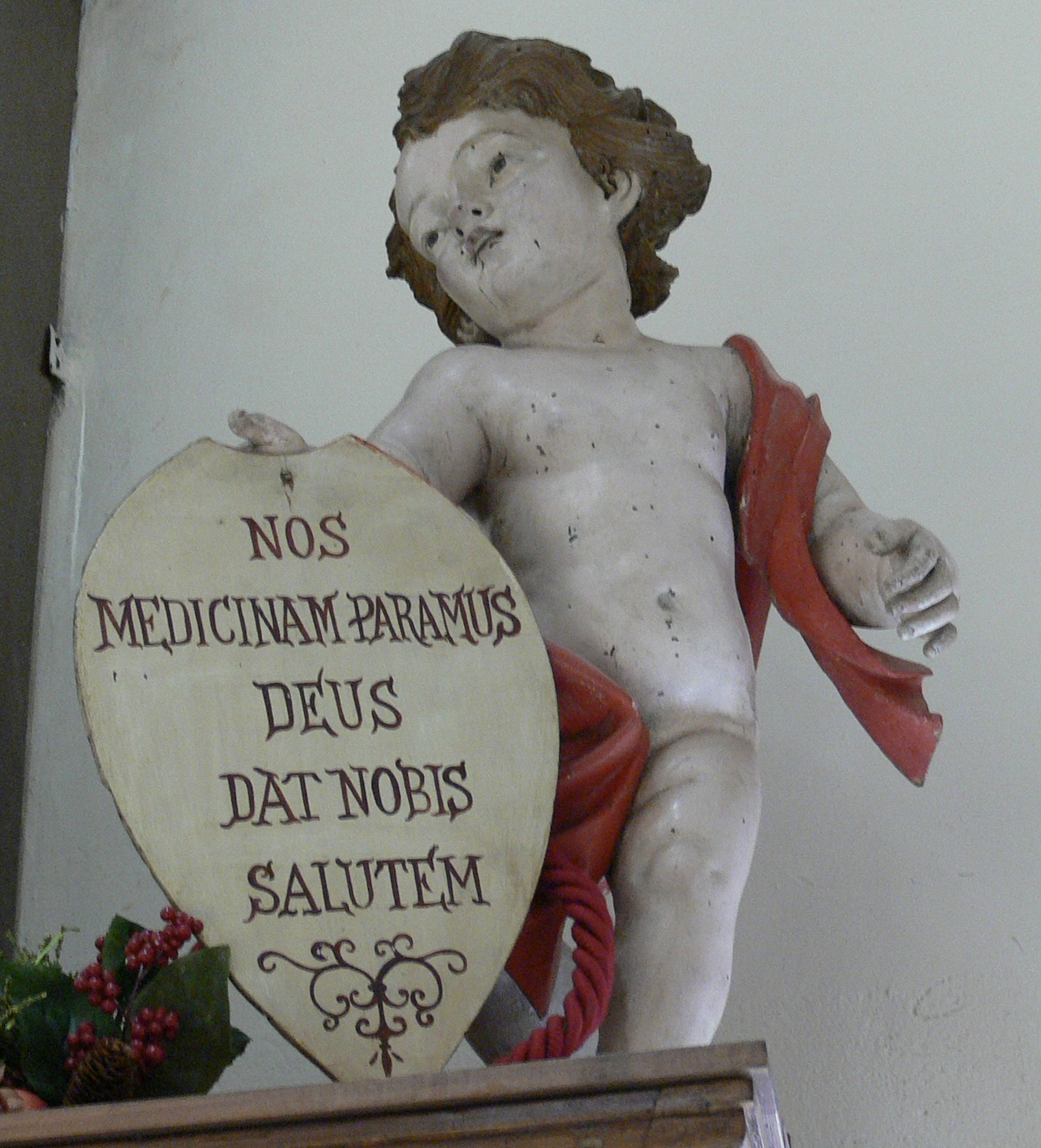
Angel with the Pharmacy's slogan

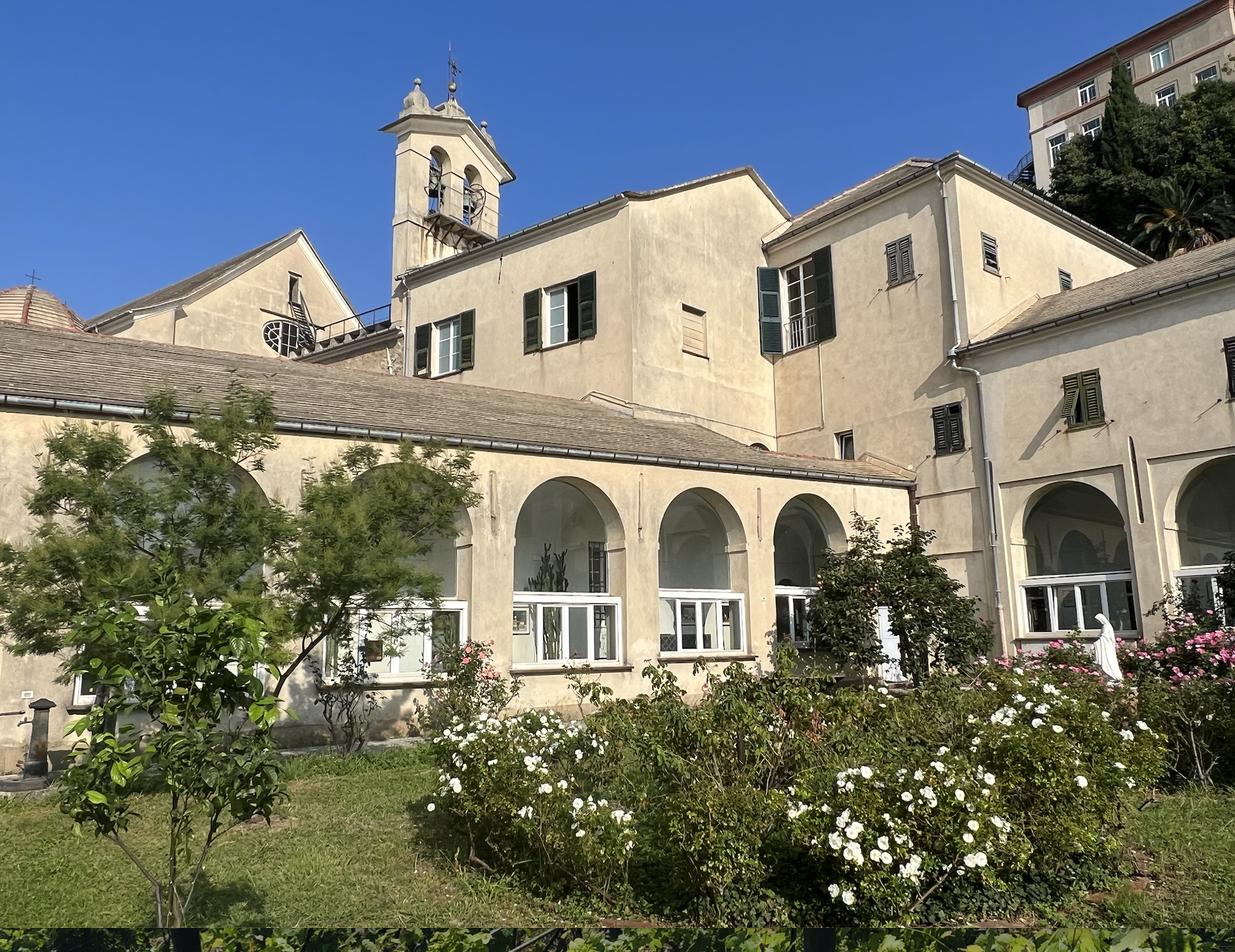
Cloister of the Roses, ancient garden for the cultivation of medical herbs

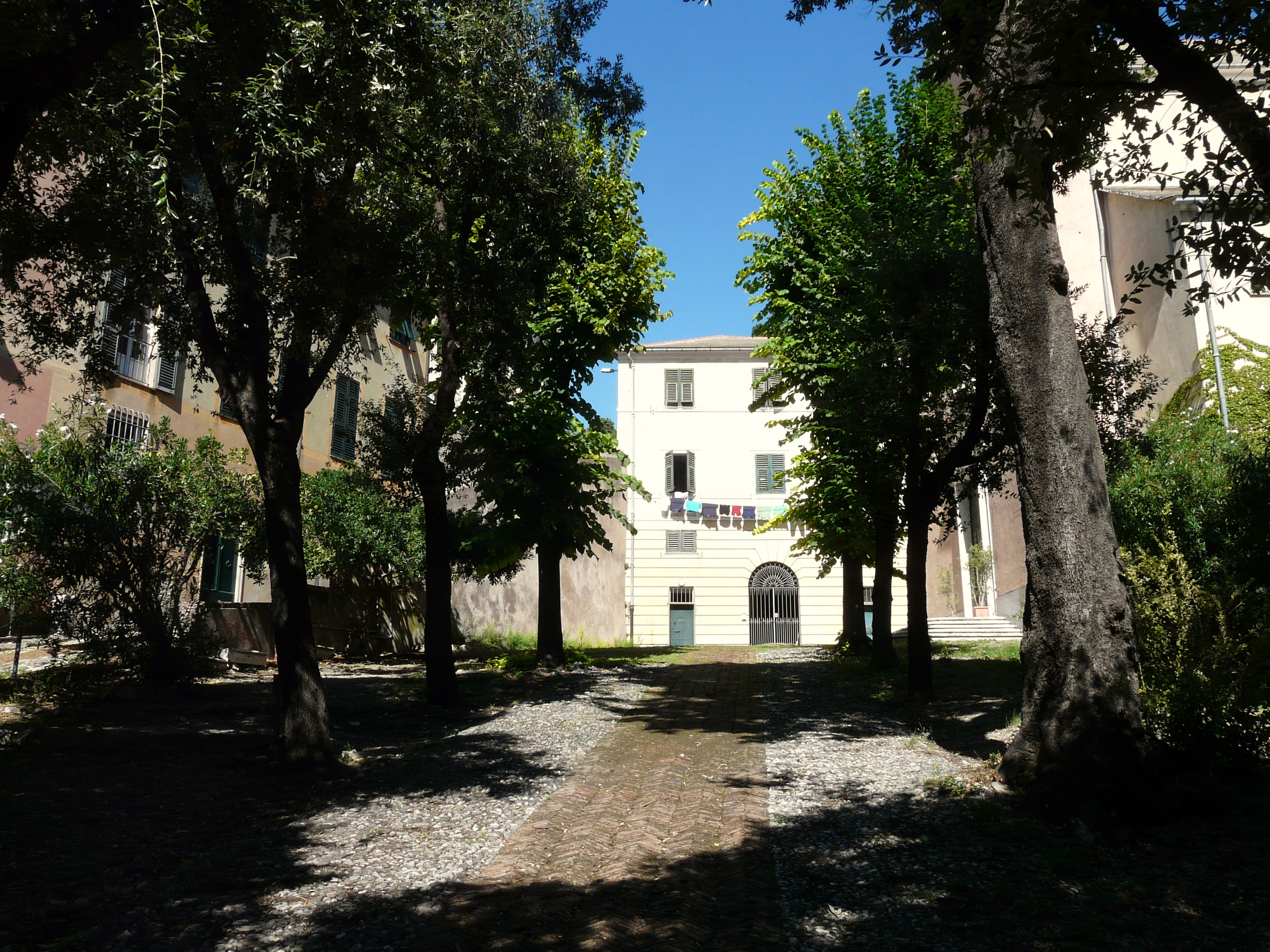
Square of the Convent

== See also ==
- Genova
- Castelletto
- Farmacia
- Chiesa di Sant'Anna
- Arcidiocesi di Genova
- Carmelitani Scalzi
- Funicolare Sant’Anna
- Ascensore Magenta-Crocco

== Bibliography ==
- Giuseppe Marcenaro (1974). Dizionario delle Chiese di Genova. Vol. I. Genova: Edizioni Tolozzi.
- Lauro Magnani, Chiesa di Sant’Anna Guide di Genova, 90, Genova, SAGEP Edizioni, 1979,
- Antonio Corvi ed Ernesto Riva, La farmacia monastica e conventuale, Pacini Editore, 1996.
- Antonio Corvi, "La Medicina curativa di Le Roy", in Atti e Memorie dell'Associazione Italiana Storia Della Farmacia, XIV n. 2 1997 p. 137
- Osservatorio Civis, Genova, guida alle botteghe storiche, De Ferrari & Devega Editori, Genova, 2002.
- Paolo Oliveri, La Farmacia di Sant'Anna dei Padri Carmelitani Scalzi in Genova, in Rivista di Storia della Farmacia, XXV, n. 1., Aprile 2008.
- Corinna Praga, Andar per creuse oltre il centro storico 2, Itinerari dal Portello, dal Vico della Croce Bianca e da via Balbi verso la Porta delle Chiappe, Italia Nostra, Genova, ERGA, 2016.
- Ezio Battaglia e Silvia Piacentini, Il Convento di Sant'Anna e la sua Antica Farmacia a Genova, SAGEP Editori, Genova 2020.
- Catalogo Generale dei Beni Culturali, Bottega storica, Farmacia, Antica Farmacia Sant'Anna.
