= Magenta–Crocco elevator =

Elevator for pedestrians in Genoa, Italy

Elevator Magenta-Crocco
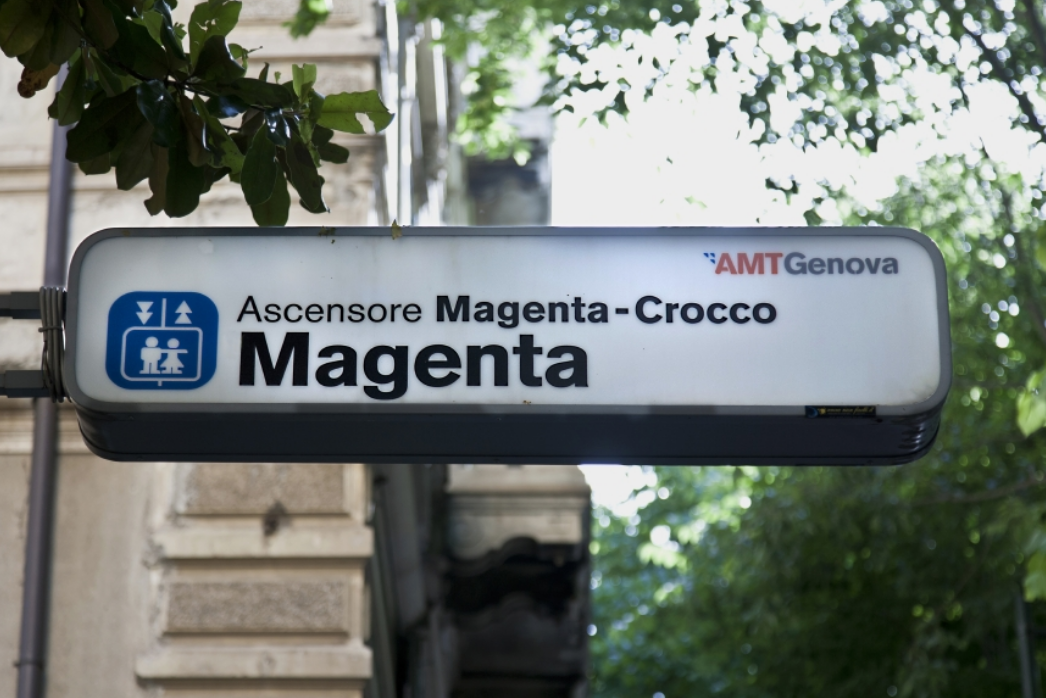
- The entrance in Corso Magenta

Overview
- Status: Open
- Locale: Genoa, Liguria, Italy
- Coordinates: 44°24′47″N 8°56′11″E

Service
- Type: Elevator
- Operator(s): AMT Genova

The Magenta–Crocco elevator is a public elevator in the Castelletto quarter of Genoa, in Northwestern Italy. It constitutes the continuation of the Sant'Anna funicular, linking Corso Magenta with via Antonio Crocco.

The elevator can be reached from Corso Magenta through a pedestrian tunnel, from which it also possible to reach a small private elevator connecting the tunnel to the Antica Farmacia Sant'Anna, the ancient and still operating pharmacy of the Sant'Anna Convent. The elevator can also be reached from a second entrance located in via Acquarone.

It entered service in 1933. In 1966, it came under the responsibility of AMT Genova. In 2007, it underwent a complete maintenance review and the substitution of the old cars with modern ones.

== History ==
The construction of the elevator started in 1929 and was commissioned to Officine Meccaniche Stigler by Istituto Edile Immobiliare Genovese, the land developer which had undertaken the urbanization of via Antonio Crocco and salita Santa Maria della Sanità. The land developer, however, did not want to take accountability for the operation of the elevator and sold it to the Municipality in 1933. In 1947, the Municipality contracted the operation of the elevator to a private operator, the Società Anonima Funicolare Genovese, which also run the nearby Sant'Anna funicular. In 1956 the Municipality took control again of the operation. In 1966 the accountability passed to the Municipal transport company AMT Genova, which renovated the elevator in 1982, 1989 and 2007. The latest complete renovation took place in 2021.

== Operation ==
- Rise: 49 metri
- Cars = 2
- Capacity: 30 people per car
- Speed: 1,8 m/s
- Time: 40 secondi
- Type: Initially Officine Meccaniche Stigler, now Elevatori Normac.
- Engine power: 37 kW
- VVVF (inverter)

== Bibliography ==
- Corrado Bozzano, Roberto Pastore e Claudio Serra, Genova in salita, Nuova Editrice Genovese, Genova, 2014, pp. 169–171, ISBN 9788896430781
- Giampiero Orselli e Patrizia Traverso, Ascensore Corso Magenta-Via Crocco, in Genova che scende e che sale, Il Canneto, Genova, 2015, pp. 201–202, ISBN 9788896430781.

== See also ==
- Sant'Anna funicular
- Sant'Anna, Genoa
- Antica Farmacia Sant'Anna
- Castelletto
