= Pietro d'Acquarone =

Italian soldier, entrepreneur and politician

Duke Pietro d'Acquarone OSML OCI

Minister to the Royal Household of the Kingdom of Italy
- In office 1939–1944
- Monarch: Victor Emmanuel III
- Prime Minister: Benito Mussolini Pietro Badoglio
- Preceded by: Alessandro Mattioli Pasqualini
- Succeeded by: Falcone Lucifero

Senator of the Kingdom of Italy
- In office 3 May 1934 – 7 November 1947
- Appointed by: Victor Emmanuel III

Personal details
- Born: 9 April 1890 Villa Madre Cabrini, then Villa Acquarone, Genoa, Kingdom of Italy
- Died: 13 February 1948 (aged 57) Villa del Sole, Sanremo, Italy
- Spouse: Maddalena Trezza di Musella (m. 1919)
- Children: 1920 Umberta; 1922 Luigi Filippo, II Duke d'Acquarone; 1925 Cesare; 1929 Maria Maddalena
- Parents: Luigi Filippo Acquarone, III Count d'Acquarone (father); Maria Pignatelli Montecalvo (mother)
- Awards: Bronze Medal of Military Valor; Silver Medal of Military Valor; War Merit Cross

Military service
- Allegiance: Kingdom of Italy
- Branch/service: Royal Italian Army
- Years of service: 1908–1924
- Rank: Brigade General
- Battles/wars: Italo-Turkish War World War I: Battle of the Lagazuoi/Falzarego; Eighth Battle of the Isonzo

Pietro d'Acquarone, I Duke d'Acquarone (born Pietro Acquarone; Genoa, 9 April 1890 – Sanremo, 13 February 1948) was an Italian aristocrat, Brigade General, entrepreneur and politician. He was nominated to the Senate of the Kingdom of Italy in 1934. Close to the royal family, in 1939 he was appointed Minister to the Royal Household. He was a trusted advisor to the King during the difficult later years of the Mussolini régime, and played a central role in the final meeting of the Grand Council that took place overnight on 24/25 July 1943, and in the frantic consultations that ensued. He accompanied Victor Emmanuel III to Pescara and Brindisi on 9/10 September 1943 and then stayed with the King until the latter's abdication 32 months later.

== Biography ==
Pietro Acquarone was born in Villa Madre Cabrini, then Villa Acquarone, in Genoa, the son of Luigi Filippo, III Count d'Acquarone, and his wife, Countess Maria, née Pignatelli Montecalvo. He was elevated to the rank of Duke by letter patents of King Victor Emmanuel III on 22 September 1942, thereby changing his surname from 'Acquarone' to 'd'Acquarone'.

=== Military career ===
The nobleman joined a cavalry regiment at a young age, serving in Libya in 1913 during the Italian-Turkish War. In May 1915 the Italian government was persuaded by the British to enter the war against the Austrians: d'Acquarone was deployed in the Northeastern Italy front and was awarded the Bronze Medal of Valor at Falzarego on 21 August 1915 and the Silver Medal of Valor at Monfalcone on 15 May 1916. After the Great War, he served as military instructor to the crown prince. This meant relocating to Rome and starting of a long professional association - increasingly complemented by close friendship - with the Italian royal family.

=== Businessman and activist ===
On 9 November 1919 Pietro d'Acquarone married Maddalena Trezza di Musella (1893–1981), the daughter of Cesare Trezza di Musella and his (originally English) wife, born Elena Knowles. Maddalena was heiress to a large fortune: she unhesitatingly signed over to her husband her own legal rights and responsibilities in respect of her father's business. The family fortune had originally been accumulated by Maddallena's grandfather, who had acquired large amounts of land on the edge of Verona and bequeathed it all to his favourite son, Cesare. Industrialisation and urbanisation during the later decades of the nineteenth century had greatly enhanced the value of the land. Cesare also had a flair for business, and had been appointed to the presidency of one of Verona's leading banks when he was just 22. The family business was not involved in the highly profitable munitions production business that massively enriched several manufacturing businesses in Verona during the war. More than three years of war accompanied by a financial crisis affecting the company (of which the details never became clear) forced the sale of many assets to pay off creditors during 1915/16.

After the war, d'Acquarone was one of many young aristocrats impatient for a return to pre-war national self-respect, economic stability and growth. He participated in both the "Fiume action" in 1919/20 and the March on Rome in 1922. He later became a leader in the Verona local militia. He would never be a Fascist Party insider, but nor is there any record of his ever expressly repudiating Italian Fascism, even after his direct involvement in masterminding the 1943 arrest of Mussolini. Despite its wartime financial crisis and the ensuing years of austerity, after Cesare Trezza's death on 18 December, the business that Maddalena Trezza – and thereby her husband – inherited was still valued at approximately three million lire.

Pietro d'Acquarone retired from active military service in 1924, attaining the rank of Brigade General, in order to devote himself to managing the family business, which by this time it is described in sources as a "finance company" ("Società anonima finanziaria"). He moved with his wife to the riverside family estate of his deceased father-in-law at San Martino Buon Albergo, on the edge of the city. Under his watch the business prospered.

In November 1929, he took a position as a financial consultant to the Società editrice de "L’Arena", publisher Verona's influential regional daily newspaper. He also held the vice-presidency of the city Chamber of Commerce – later rebranded and relaunched as the "Regional Council of the Corporate Economy" ("Consiglio provinciale dell'economia corporativa").

=== Senator ===
In a letter dated 27 December 1933 Pietro d'Acquarone was nominated for membership of the senate by Senator Melchiade Gabba, acting on behalf of the Prince of Savoy whose own proposal was dated 1 December 1933. (Note: "Prince of Savoy" was one of many titles held by Crown Prince Umberto.) The appointment went ahead on 23 January 1934, and d'Acquarone swore his senatorial oath on 3 May 1934, following then usual verification checks. In addition to being nominated, appointment as a senator was subject to certain conditions. D'Acquarone was appointed "per censo", a term taken from the ancient Roman senate, which two thousand years earlier had referenced a list of public appointments previously held. By 1933 the criteria and usages had changed: the record spells out that D'Acquarone qualified for senate membership under condition number 21, because he was one of those who for each of the precious three years had paid at least three thousand lire in direct taxation, either personally or else in respect of the business(es) he owned. (Note: "Le persone che da tre anni pagano tremila lire d'imposizione diretta in ragione dei loro beni o della loro industria")

=== Royal insider ===
Senate membership presumably involved spending more time in Rome. During the 1930s d'Acquarone saw more of his friend, Victor Emmanuel. The king came to admire his administrative abilities, instinctive thriftiness and his talents as a financial manager. At the end of 1938 he was appointed Minister to the Royal House in succession to Alessandro Pasqualini, who had by this time reached the age of 75. D'Acquarone's appointment took effect at the start of 1939. The appointment was evidently a success: d'Acquarone, who had been confirmed as a count by royal decree on 2 October 1919, was promoted to the status of duke by means of a royal decree dated 22 September 1942. The king's confidence in his administrative skills and good judgment more broadly only grew, meaning that behind the scenes Pietro d'Acquarone had become the monarch's most respected and trusted adviser. D'Acquarone's was deeply engaged as the king's backstairs messenger in the months and weeks preceding the successful "coup d’état" against Mussolini on 25/26 July 1943. Through his contacts with dissident fascists, disillusioned army commanders, Italian industrialists as well among known anti-fascist circles, he was able to ensure that the king was as well informed about opinions in the country as any member of the Grand Council when he finally dismissed Mussolini from his post.

=== Go-Between ===
As early as 14 March 1940, three months before Italy entered the war, Pietro d'Acquarone approached Count Ciano in order to alert him to the king's concerns. (Note: Count Ciano served as Minister of Foreign Affairs between June 1936 and February 1943. Through his marriage to Edda Mussolini he had also been the leader's son-in-law since 1930.) Over the next three years, however, the warning having been communicated, there was no follow-up with Ciano. After February 1943, when Ciano was transferred from the foreign ministry to the Italian ambassadorship at the Vatican, d'Acquarone was encouraged to hope that the development might open the way for less blinkered elements in the Fascist movement to persuade Mussolini of the intensifying dangers represented by the "Axis Alliance". Records of d'Acquarone's contacts with Dino Grandi during the first half of 1943, provide evidence of his attempts to persuade leading fascist party members in the government to take a more assertive line. On the morning of 25 July 1943, directly following the Grand Council meeting, sought out Dino Grandi, before immediately reporting back to the king.

The historian Claudio Pavone, who made a close study of the period, suggested that Victor Emmanuel's evolving strategy after 1940, whereby the monarchy should progressively distance itself from the fascist government and, in particular, from the disastrous military alliance with Germany, was based on ideas hammered out jointly by the king and d'Acquarone. Their strategic goal would be "fascism without Mussolini", a non-fascist government of technocrats backed by leading anti-Mussolini army officers, which could create the conditions for as prolonged a period as of resistance as might prove necessary for the political forces of antifascism. D'Acquarone was therefore opposed to the government structure proposed early in July 1943 whereby Marshal Badoglio should take over as president of the council (i.e. "prime minister") with the venerable antifascist statesman Ivanoe Bonomi as vice-president of the council. In the event Badoglio would take over leadership of the government following the removal of Mussolini, although following the liberation of Rome in June 1944, at the urgent prompting of the American and British authorities he would be replaced by Bonomi in the role. Meanwhile, throughout the middle months of 1943 d'Acquarone maintained close contact on behalf of the king with the principal military leaders, including Chief of the General Staff Vittorio Ambrosio, General Giacomo Carboni, General Giuseppe Castellano and Marshal Badoglio himself. D'Acquarone had served under Badoglio as an Ordinance Officer, and the two men had been on friendly terms for many years.

His work as an intermediary on behalf of the king was not restricted to military leaders. As early as 26 May 1943 d'Acquarone had the first in a series of meetings with Ivanoe Bonomi, who presented himself as the representative of a number of antifascist politicians, many of whom had been politically engaged before 1922, and others of whom were already enjoying the discrete hospitality of the pope at the seminary complex attached to the Archbasilica of Saint John Lateran, in the eastern part of the city centre. His most frequent political contacts during the summer months of 1943 were with Bonomi and Marcello Soleri: he was also communicating regularly with the veteran statesman Vittorio Emanuele Orlando. Mussolini was made aware, by his newly appointed police chief, of the complex network of contacts that d'Acquarone was operating on behalf of the king, but seems to have been unwilling to attach too much importance to the matter. Then, on the evening of 25 July 1943, Pietro d'Acquarone was one of the men present when Benito Mussolini was arrested by police as he left the Villa Savoia after a twenty-minute meeting with the king. The Badoglio government that was now established reflected d'Acquarone preference for a government of non-fascist technocrats even though the fact that the government was led by a military man (and contained several more) was not in line with his preferences. He continued to be extremely busy in the shadows behind the scenes, to the extent that in the diaries of Ivanoe Bonomi, which were later published, he is described as the king's "eminence grise". There are also indications that d'Acquarone, during this period, was serving as a go-between for the king in communications with his daughter-in-law, the Princess of Savoy who had spent much of the First World War as a Belgian royal evacuee at the Brentwood Ursuline Convent High School in Brentwood, England and whom the king suspected - correctly - of conducting a personal foreign policy that aligned more closely with the needs of the Belgians and the wishes of the Americans than with the interests and international policy of Italy.

The armistice of 3 September 1943 - made public after 8 September 1943 - between Italy and the Anglo-American alliance was naturally no surprise to d'Acquarone, who had closely followed the negotiations involved in its preparation in order to be able to brief the king. On 9 or 10 September 1943 he immediately followed the king and Marshal Badoglio south, first to Pescara and then on to Brindisi. Although Italy's leaders had been prepared for the armistice, the nation's soldiers, airmen and seamen of the Italian forces had not been. Nor were they prepared for the rapid - and evidently well prepared - disarmament programme that their German (former) allies implemented directly after news of the armistice emerged. Rome itself would not be liberated for nearly another nine months. It was therefore necessary that the king, his advisors and senior ministers move to the south of Italy, which was already under Anglo-American military occupation, as a matter of the greatest urgency. A temporary royal court was then established in Brindisi, while the slow and bloody, but by this stage seemingly inevitable, liberation of the rest of Italy from south to north, by Italian partisans in partnership with Anglo-American forces, progressed. (Note: Inevitably English language sources tend to stress the leading role of the Anglo-American forces in the liberation of Italy during 1943/44. By the same logic, Italian sources tend to place greater emphasis on the part played by Italian partisan brigades.) During their time in Brindisi d'Acquarone continued to maintain close contact on behalf of the king with the men who were emerging as the future political leaders of post-fascist Italy, such as Benedetto Croce, Enrico De Nicola, Giovanni Porzio, Giulio Rodinò and Carlo Sforza. It was widely accepted that Pietro d'Acquarone continued to exercise a powerful influence on the decisions of the monarch, even taking it upon himself, on occasion, to oppose Marshal Badoglio. A particularly important case in point arose over whether or not what remained of the Kingdom of Italy should now declare war against Germany. With the southern third of Italy under Anglo-American occupation and the central and northern two thirds effectively under German occupation, d'Acquarone and the king were both opposed to such a move. On 13 October 1943 the Badoglio government and the Kingdom of Italy, from their Brindisi base, did nevertheless declare war on Germany: Badoglio later recalled that it had been necessary to wait for d'Acquarone to be temporarily absent before the king could be persuaded not to oppose his government over the matter. He was also strongly opposed to creating volunteer corps (the "Gruppi Combattenti Italia") under the leadership of Resistance General Giuseppe Pavone in Naples during September/October 1943, an initiative proposed by Benedetto Croce. The idea seems to have been to achieve the liberation of the city with Italian forces by backing and focusing the anti-German uprising which broke out a few days before the arrival of an Anglo-American army of liberation. Although Naples was indeed liberated, the involvement of the volunteer corps came to be seen by many commentators and historians as, at best, a cause for gratuitous muddle and unnecessary additional blood-letting.

Pietro d'Acquarone also opposed the abdication of Victor Emmanuel, for which governments in London and Washington were pressing. The king himself had little confidence that his son, still barely 40, was ready to take over. Larger forces were at play, but nevertheless a compromise proved possible, whereby on 10 April 1944 Victor Emmanuel agreed to hand over most of his powers and responsibilities to the Crown Prince, while Umberto took on what was termed the lieutenancy of the kingdom. A few weeks later, on 4 June 1944, d'Acquarone resigned his position as Minister to the Royal House. His successor, Falcone Lucifero, would work with the Crown Prince. In reality d'Acquarone continued to act as advisor to his friend, the old king, but now on an unpaid basis, and known officially not as the "Minister to the Royal House" but as the "Honorary Minister to the Royal House". He remained with the king till the actual abdication, which took place on 9 May 1946.

=== Final years ===
In 1946 Duke d'Acquarone finally withdrew from public life. He returned to Verona, resuming effective control over the Trezza business in Verona.

During the 1930s Pietro d'Acquarone acquired possession of the Villa del Sole, a large Fin de siècle villa at San Remo. It was at San Remo that on 13 February 1948 he died. His body's final journey was back to Genoa, the city of his birth, where it is placed close to that of his mother in the vast Cemetery of Staglieno.

== Issue ==
Pietro d'Acquarone married Maddalena Trezza di Musella on 9 November 1919. The marriage was followed by the births of the couple's two daughters and two sons:

- 1920: Umberta, who was named after the crown prince to whom her father was serving as military educator at the time of her birth
- 1922: Luigi Filippo, II Duke d'Acquarone, who succeeded to the dukedom in 1948
- 1925: Cesare, who died young and hit the headlines in 1968 when he was shot dead by his mother-in-law
- 1929: Maria Maddalena, known popularly as "Mia Acquarone", and in their later years became a target of press photographers as a companion to the celebrity-actor Stewart Granger

The New York-born journalist Filippo D'Acquarone is son to II Duke Luigi Filippo d'Acquarone by the duke's first marriage to Countess Emanuela Castelbarco Pindemonte Rezzonico (granddaughter of Arturo Toscanini). He is thereby grandson to Pietro D'Acquarone.

== Ancestry ==
Tommaso Acquarone
Giacomo Filippo Acquarone, I conte d'Acquarone
Pietro Acquarone, II conte d'Acquarone
Luigi Filippo Acquarone, III conte d'Acquarone
Maria Gabriella Landolina di Torrebruna
Pietro d'Acquarone, I duca d'Acquarone
Giuseppe Pignatelli, VII duca di Montecalvo
Carlo Pignatelli, VIII duca di Montecalvo
Doristella Caracciolo d'Arena
Alfonso Pignatelli di Montecalvo
Giuseppe Caracciolo, VII principe di Torella
Carolina Caracciolo di Torella
Caterina Saliceti
Maria Pignatelli di Montecalvo
Marianna Pandolfelli
