= Sant'Anna, Genoa =

Church building in Genoa, Italy

Church of Saint Anne (Chiesa di Sant'Anna)
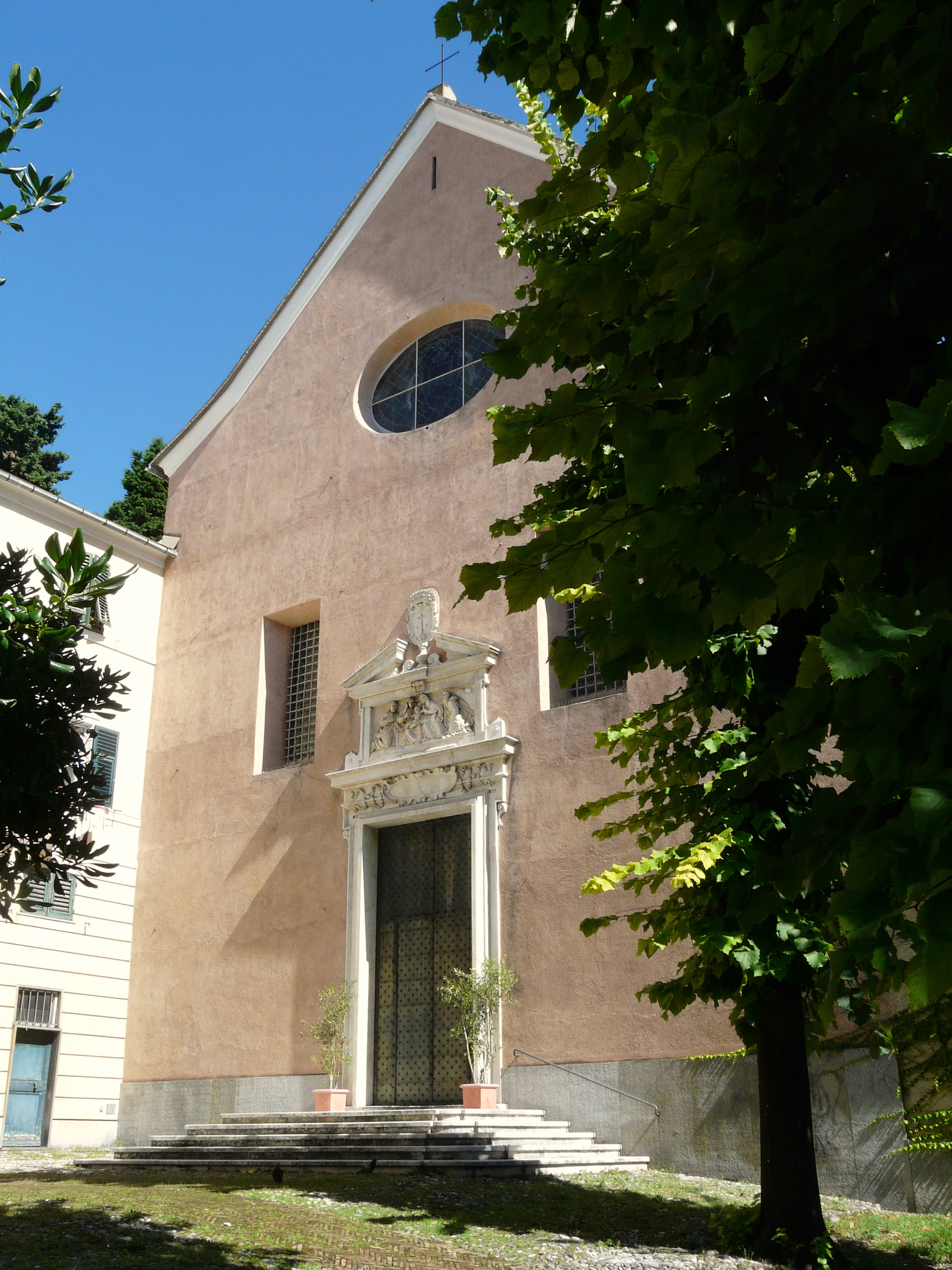
- The façade of the church.

Religion
- Affiliation: Roman Catholic
- Province: Genoa

Location
- Location: Genoa, Italy
- Interactive map of Church of Saint Anne (Chiesa di Sant'Anna)
- Coordinates: 44.415553°N 8.937022°E

Architecture
- Type: Church
- Groundbreaking: 16th Century
- Completed: 16th Century

The Church of Saint Anne (Italian: Chiesa di Sant'Anna), with the adjacent convent and pharmacy of the Discalced Carmelites, is a Roman Catholic church located in the residential quarter of Castelletto in Genoa, Liguria, north-western Italy. The village - now surrounded by the city - is still intact, with its leafy trees, cobbled walkways and open views from Salita Bachernia over the Gulf of Genoa, the harbor and the Old City.

== History ==
The convent of Saint Anne was founded in 1584 under the impulse of father Nicolò Doria, who returned from Spain to the Republic of Genoa to establish a monastery twenty years after the reformation of the Carmelite Order operated by Saint Theresa of Avila and Saint John of the Cross. The pharmacy, still operating and currently known as Antica Farmacia Sant'Anna, was already documented in 1650.

At the time of the foundation, the area was identified by the phytonym Bachernia, a reference to the berries of Rosa Canina (Italian: bacca), which is still used today to name the steep pathway (Italian: salita; Ligurian: crêuza) connecting the church to the New Walls. In the 18th century, alongside rural buildings, the first suburban villas were built, including the first nucleus of Villa Madre Cabrini, which is located near the entrance of the church. The area developed into a village with a growing number of inhabitants. The urbanization at the end of the 19th century saw the laying of the so-called Mountain Ringway (Italian: Circonvallazione a Monte) and the high-class Art Nouveau buildings of Corso Magenta and the Sant'Anna funicular being built immediately south of the church, but without affecting the integrity of the ancient hamlet. To this day, Sant'Anna remains an oasis of calm within the city, with its sycamore trees, cobbled paving and views over the old city and the harbor, only few minutes away from the central Corvetto square.

== Description ==
The church features a single nave, several lateral chapels, and a 16th-century portal with a marble relief of the Holy Family. Among the artwork contained in the church, it is worth noting: the large marble statue on the main altar with Saint’Anne and Child Mary, made by Francesco Maria Schiaffino; the paintings made by Domenico Fiasella of The Martyrdom of Saint’Andreas and The Martyrdom of Saint’Ursula; the painting by Agostino Ciampelli of Saint Joseph and the Angel; the painting by Castellino Castello of Jesus and Saint Teresa; and the 16th-century Marriage of the Virgin Mary, attributed to a Spanish-school painter. The frescoes were made in 1882.

== The pharmacy ==
Immediately after the foundation, the friars established a pharmacy, first mentioned in 1650. The documents recount that father Martinus of Saint’Anthony (1638-1721) “went out every day to find the ingredients necessary for the ailments […] and many came to him, although not everyone was cured by the same type of remedy […] and, therefore, it was necessary to make different potions, medicines and remedies”. The records of the pharmacy report the names of the ailments and the clients. The most used preparations were the manna, tablets against teniasis, white sugar, Chinese potions, English salts, cinnamon, poppy flowers and a “spirit made of incense, myrrh, aloe and wine”. Amongst the clients, at the beginning of the 19th century there was the physician Angelo Bruzick, the chirurg Rocco Artisi of Voltri, the consul of Denmark Giuseppe Alessi Morellet, the pharmacy of the Genoese public hospital of Pammatone. Later the pharmacy had contact with the controversial Parisian doctor Louis Le Roy, author of “La medicina curativa” published in Naples in 1825 in four volumes. The pharmacy is still active and known as the "Antica Farmacia Sant'Anna". It can also be reached using a private elevator from the pedestrian tunnel of the elevator Magenta-Crocco.

== See also ==
- Genoa
- Castelletto
- Antica Farmacia Sant'Anna
- Discalced Carmelites
- Villa Madre Cabrini
- Funicolare Sant’Anna
- Elevator Magenta-Crocco

== Bibliography ==
- Nadia Pazzini Paglieri e Rinangelo Paglieri, Chiese in Liguria, Sagep: Genova 1990, ISBN 88-7058-361-9
- Giuseppe Marcenaro, Francesco Repetto, Dizionario delle Chiese di Genova, vol. I, Edizioni Tolozzi, Genova 1974
- Lauro Magnani (a cura di), Chiesa di Sant’Anna, Guide di Genova, n.90, Sagep, Genova 1979
- AA.VV., Chiese di Genova, n. 8, Sagep, Genova 1986
- Elena Parma Armani, Maria Clelia Galassi, Artisti e artigiani del marmo dal Cinquecento al Seicento, in AA.VV., La scultura a Genova e in Liguria dal Seicento al primo Novecento, Vol. II, pp. 43–4

== Gallery ==
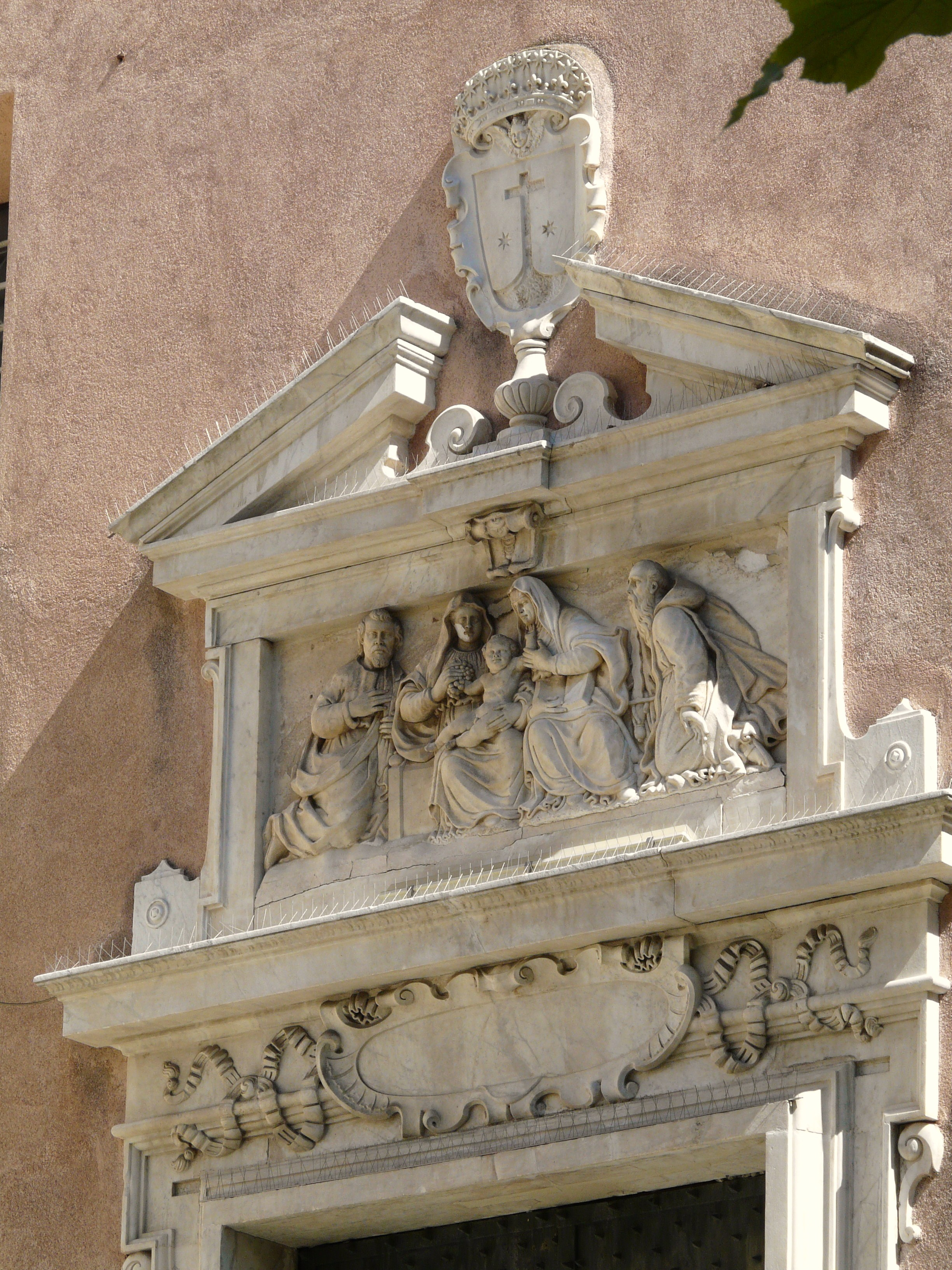
Portale d'ingresso della chiesa

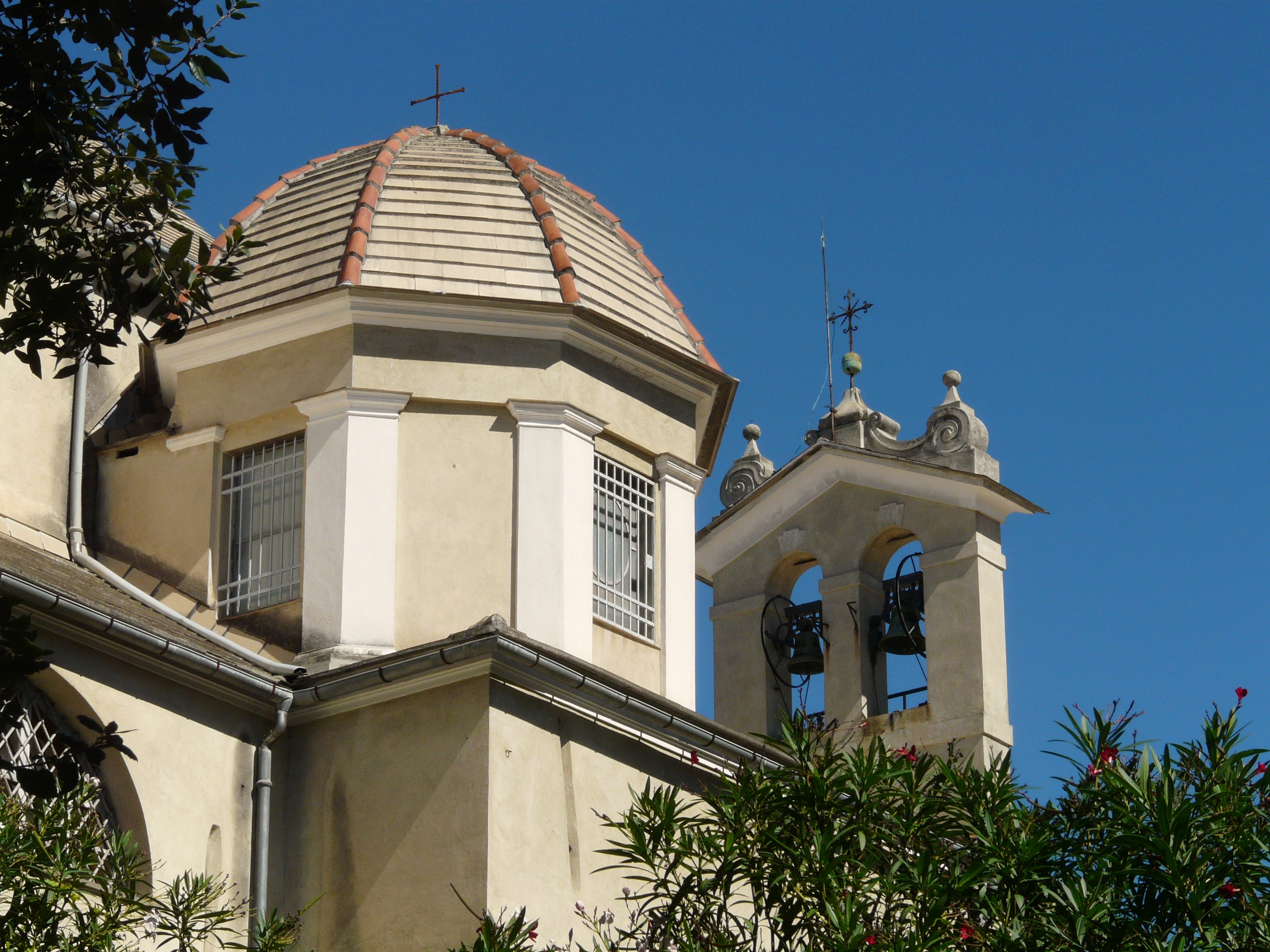
Cupola e campanile a vela

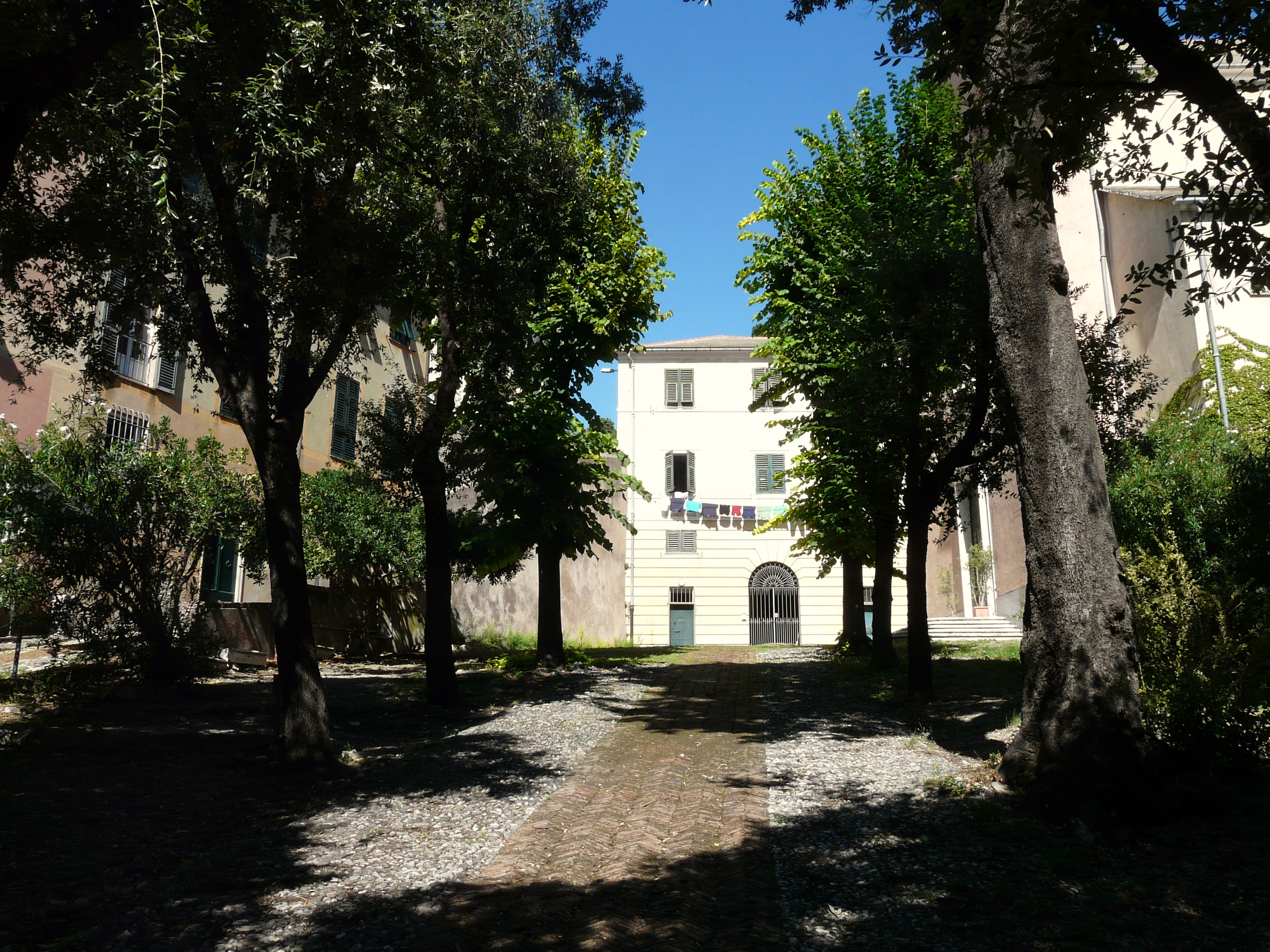
Sagrato della chiesa
