= Castelletto (Genoa) =

Residential quarter of Genoa, Italy

Coordinates: 44°24′49″N 8°55′59″E

Castelletto is a residential quarter of Genoa, north-western Italy. It occupies a hilly area which, until the construction of the New Walls in the 17th century, was located outside of the city. The quarter is now part of the city's Municipio I Centro Est and comprises three urban units (Castelletto, Manin and San Nicola) which, as of 31 December 2010, had a total population of 28,857 combined.

The name, meaning "small castle" in Italian, comes from a fort overlooking the center of Genoa, recorded as early as the 10th century AD and dismantled in the late 19th century to make way to residential buildings and the panoramic belvedere in the so-called Spianata di Castelletto.

== Tourist sights ==
- The belvedere in the Spianata di Castelletto, the location of the dismantled fort that gave the quarter its name, has views over the Old City and the Gulf of Genoa.
- The Basilica of Holy Mary Immaculate in via Assarotti, completed in 1904 in neo-Renaissance style.
- The Albergo dei Poveri ("Hostel of the Poor"), a complex built in the late 17th century as a shelter for the poor. It is now owned by the University of Genoa, which houses its Political Sciences Faculty there.
- Villetta di Negro, a hill park occupying the 16th century bastion of St. Caterina, which has artificial caves and waterfalls.
- Villa Pallavicino or Villa delle Peschiere (16th century)
- D'Albertis Castle, a Gothic Revival architecture now housing the Museum of World Cultures
- Mackenzie Castle, another Gothic Revival manor now used for exhibitions designed by Gino Coppedè (who also designed the nearby Castello Bruzzo)
- Church of Nostra Signora di Lourdes e San Bernardo
- Church of San Nicola da Tolentino
- Baroque sanctuary of Madonnetta, housing Baroque artworks by Giuseppe Gaggini's school, by Giovanni Battista Paggi and by Anton Maria Maragliano. It is home to a permanent example of local nativity scene.
- The 16th century convent, pharmacy and church of Sant'Anna, and the surrounding ancient Bachernia village, with trees, cobbled walkways and views over the Gulf of Genoa, the harbor and the Old City from Salita Bachernia.
- Church of San Bartolomeo degli Armeni
- Aqueduct of Genoa
- 17th century city walls
- Forte Castellaccio and Specola Towers
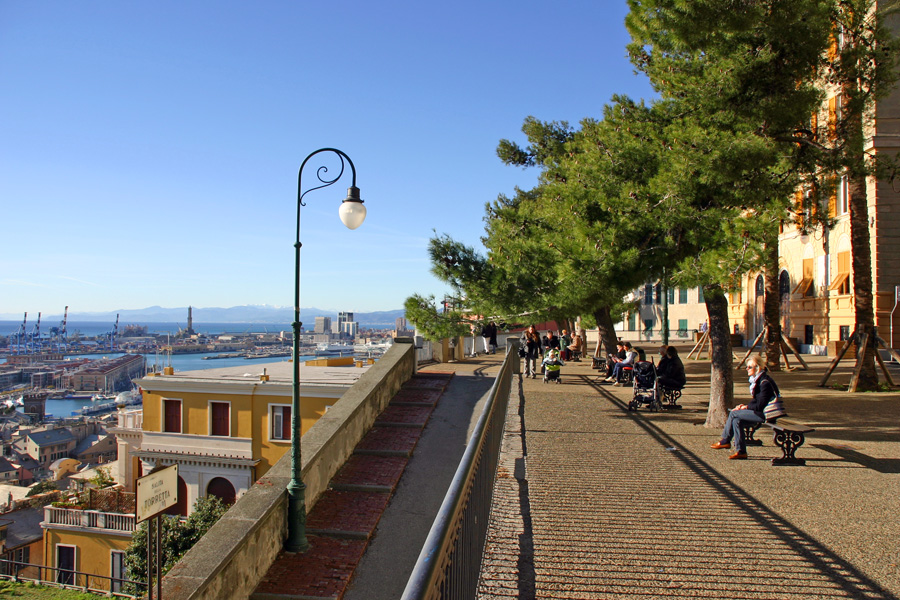
The belvedere in the Spianata di Castelletto, the location of the dismantled fort that gave the quarter its name.

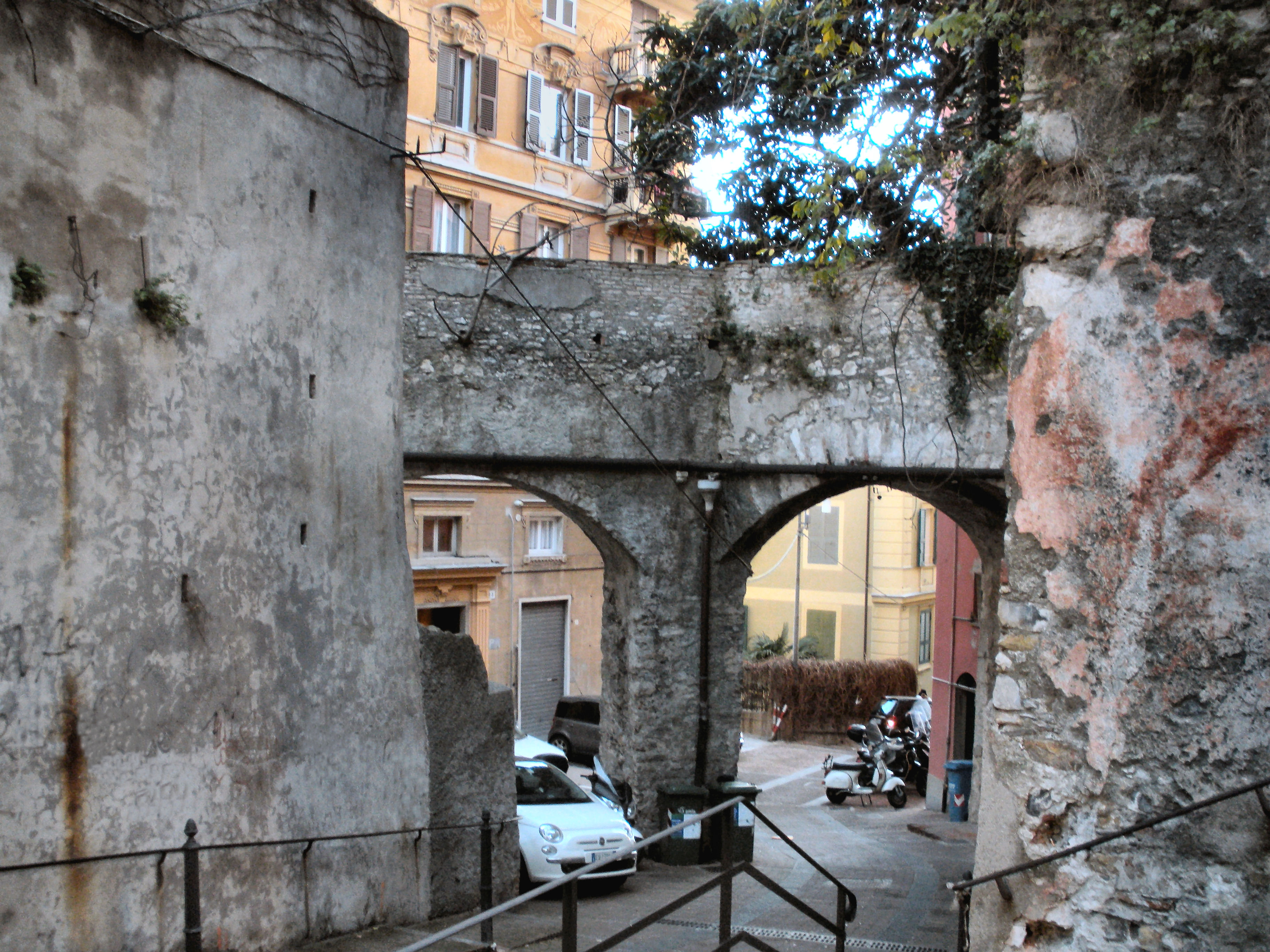
Ancient bridge-aqueduct, belonging to the Historical Aqueduct of Genoa.

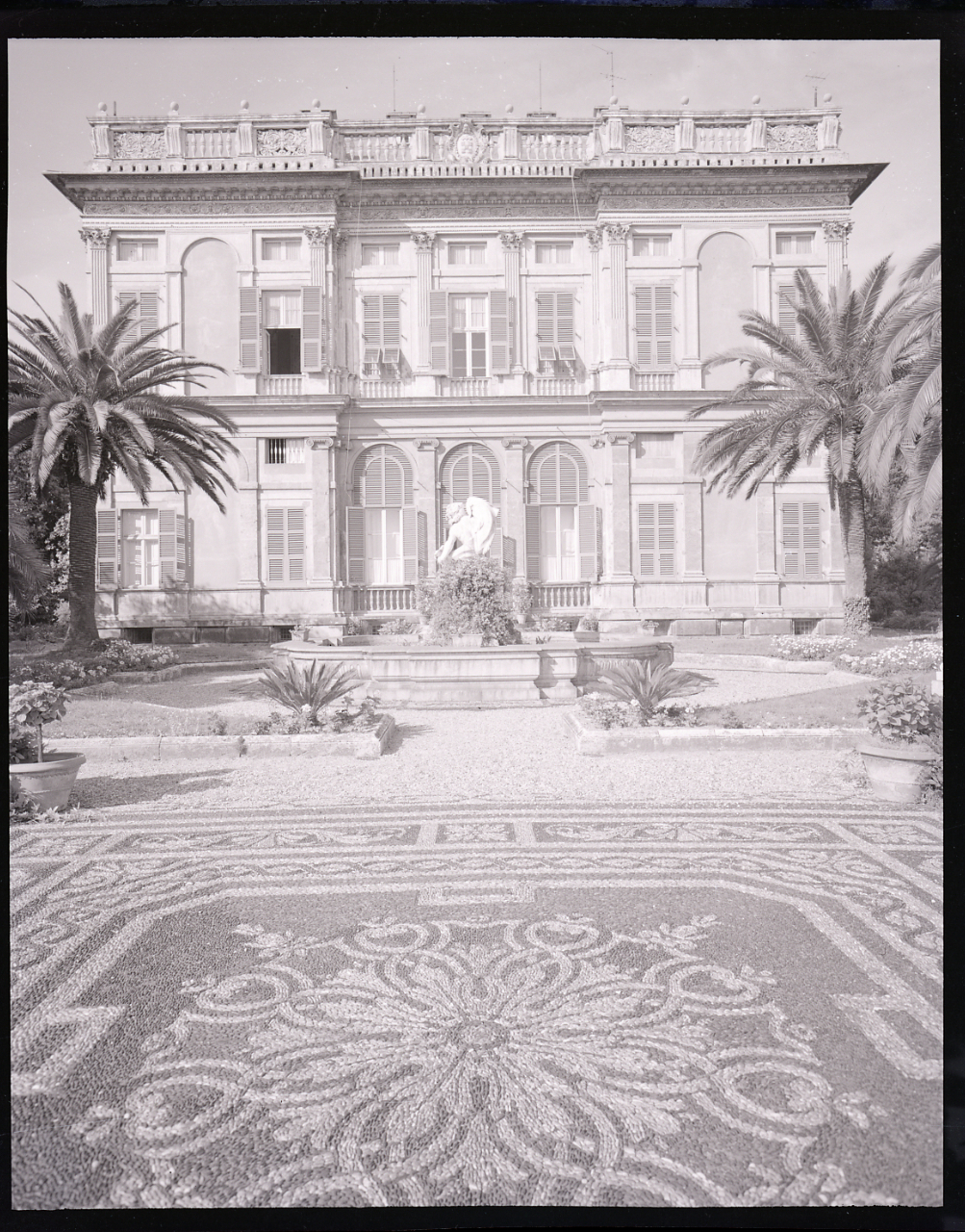
Villa Pallavicino called "delle Peschiere" photographed by Paolo Monti in 1963

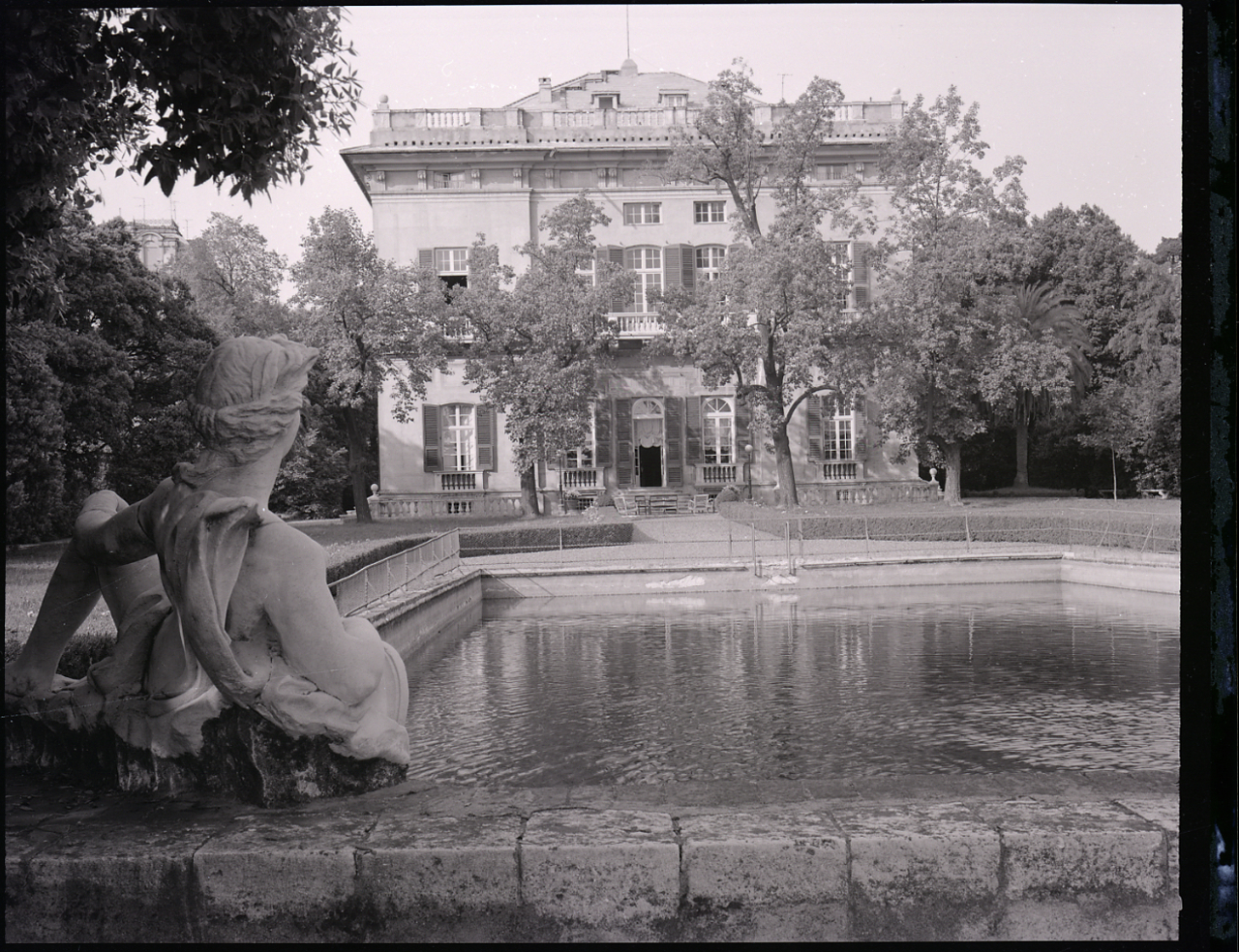
Villa Gropallo dello Zerbino photographed by Paolo Monti in 1963

== Sources ==
- Caraceni Poleggi, Fiorella (1984). Genova - Guida Sagep. SAGEP Editrice - Automobile Club di Genova.
