= Villa del Sole =

Villa in Sanremo, Italy

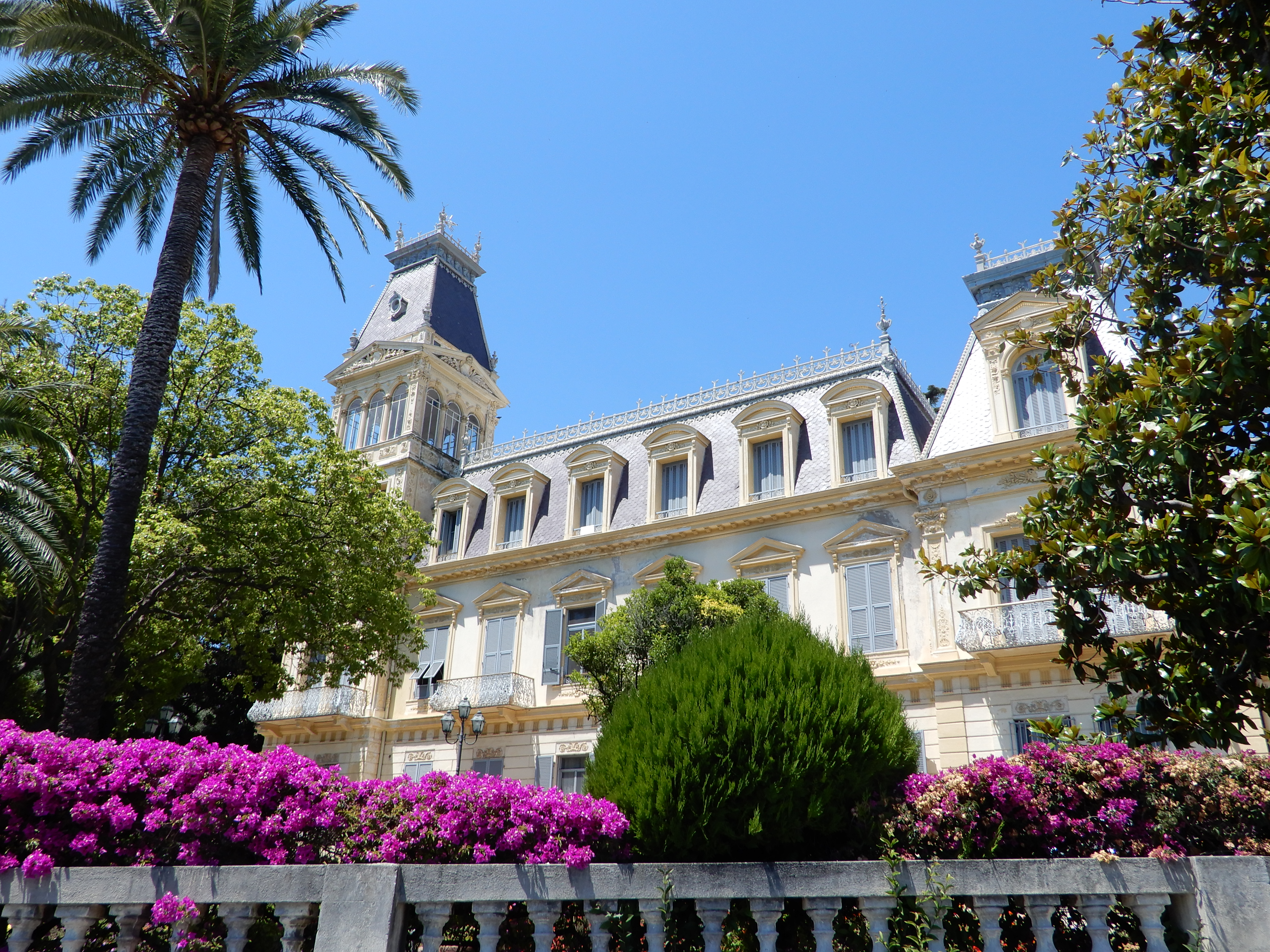
- Villa del Sole in Sanremo
- Click on the map for a fullscreen view

General information
- Architectural style: Eclectic
- Location: Sanremo, Italy
- Coordinates: 43°49′26.1″N 7°48′00.3″E

Design and construction
- Architect(s): Pio Soli

Villa del Sole is an eclectic villa situated in Sanremo, Italy.

== History ==
The villa, designed by architect Pio Soli, was built in 1898.

The property belonged for many years to Pietro d'Acquarone, 1st Duke d'Acquarone, who served as Minister of the Royal Household between 1939 and 1944. The villa also occasionally hosted Elena of Montenegro, Queen consort of Italy during her stays in Sanremo.

== Description ==
The villa, which features an eclectic style, has a mansard roof.

== Gallery ==
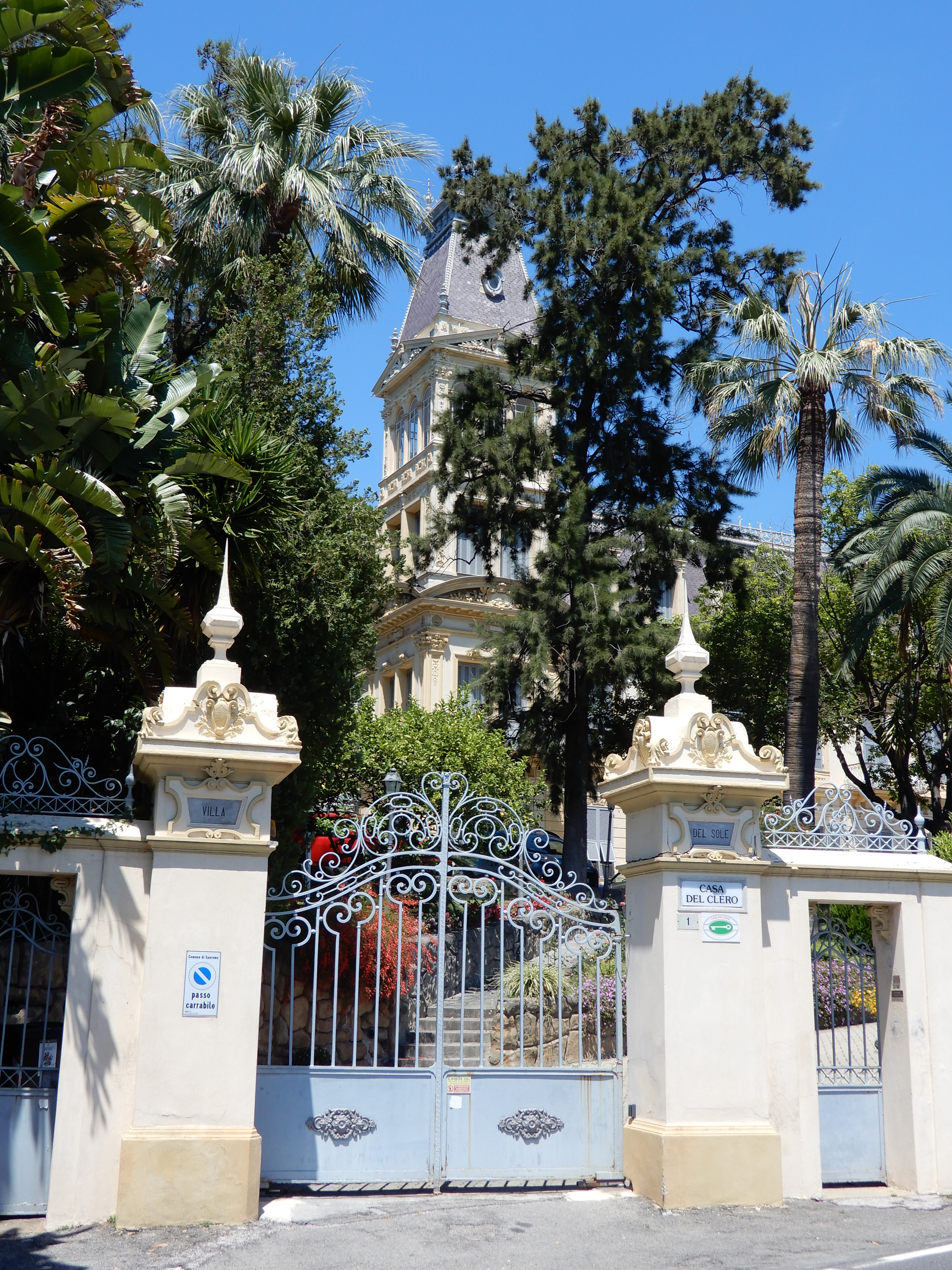

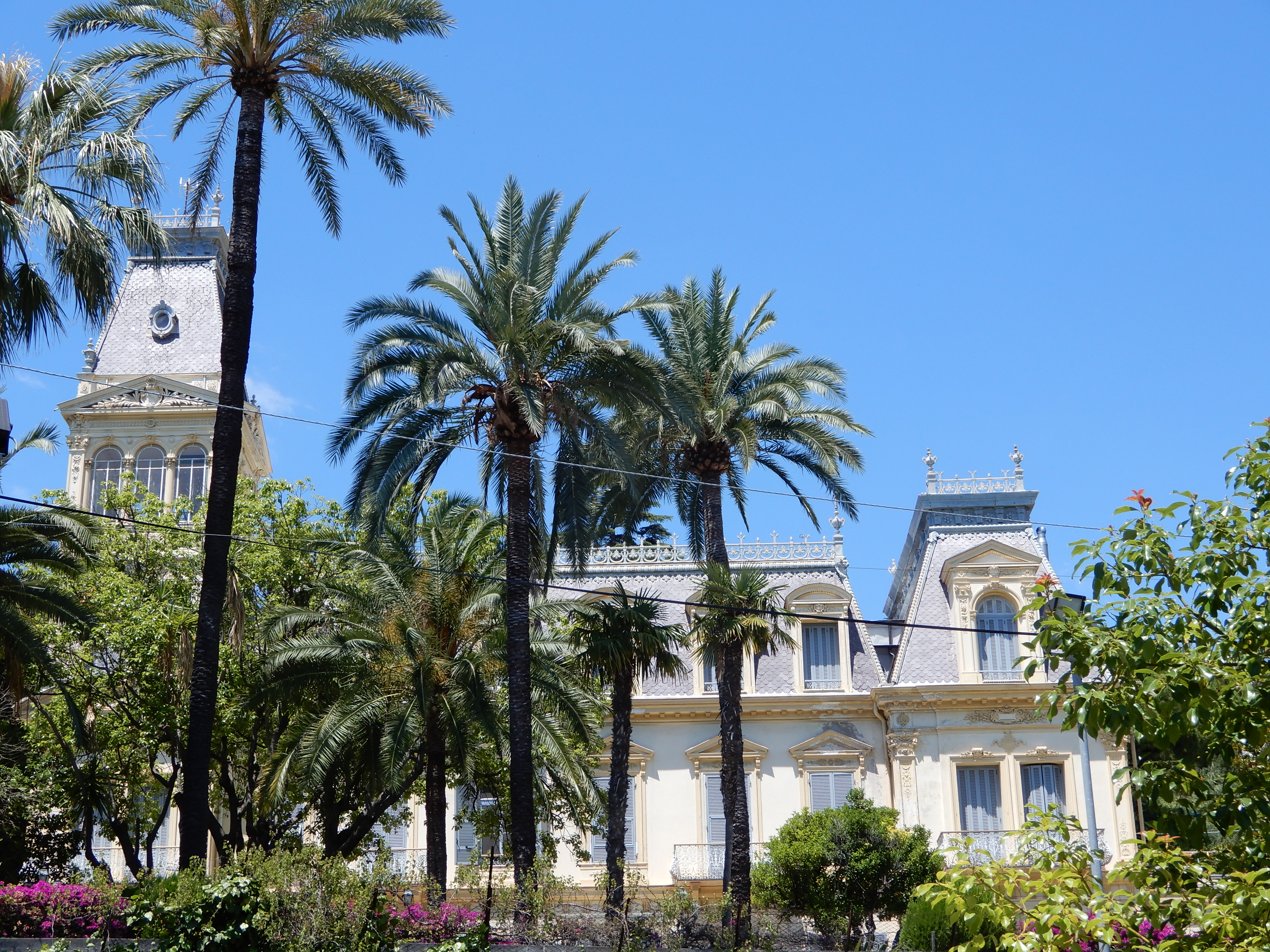

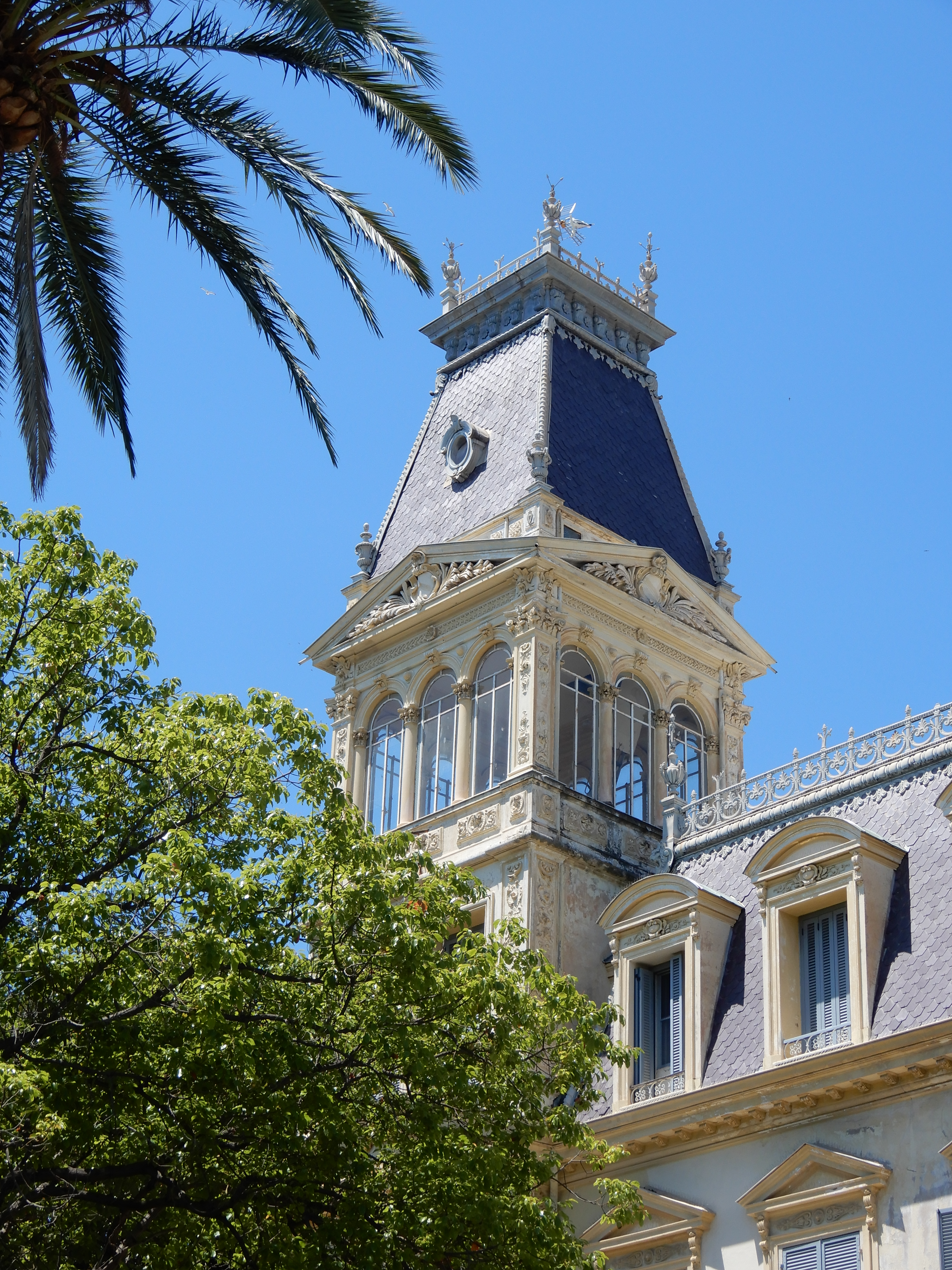
