= Villa Stefania =

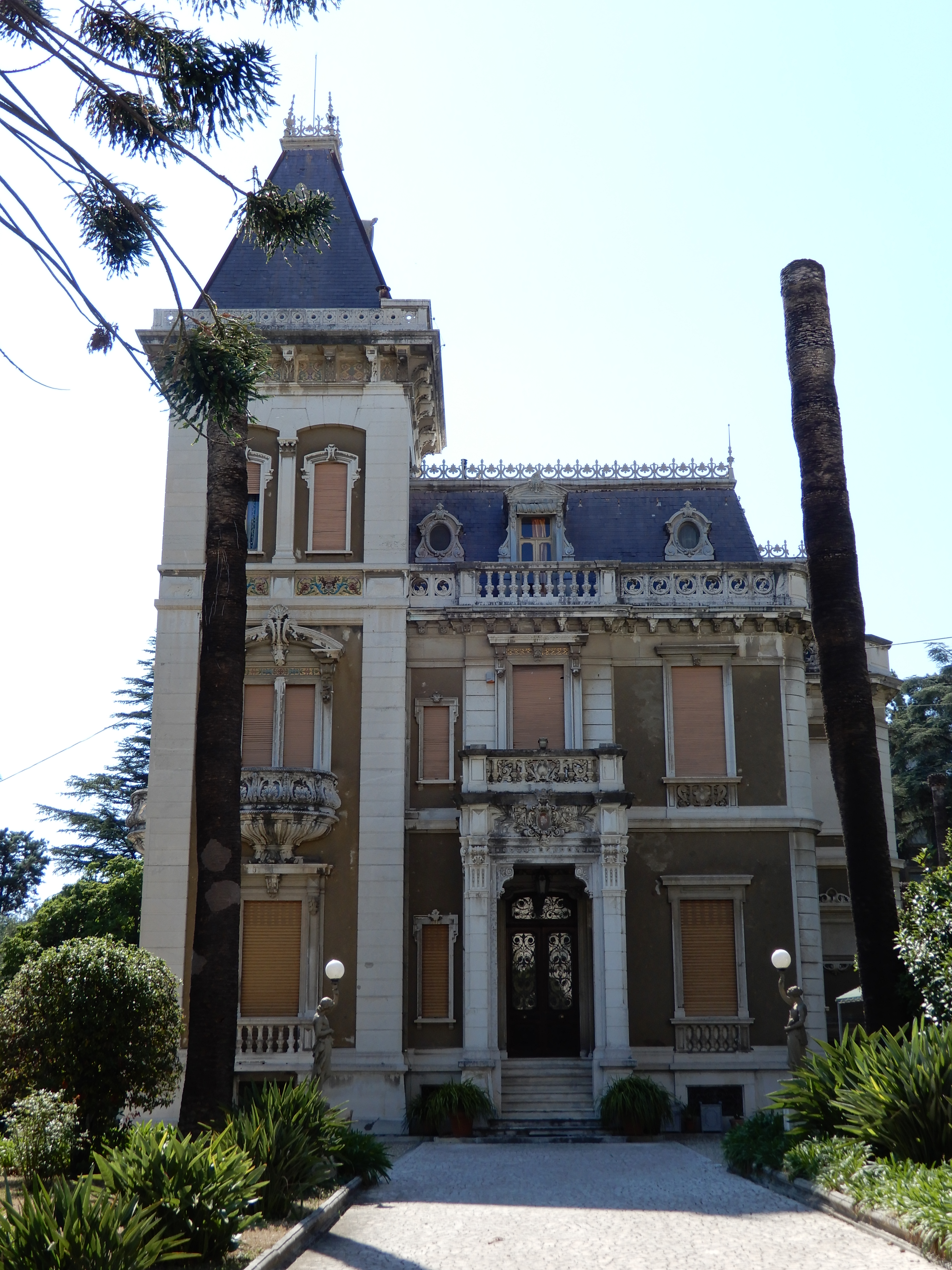
- Villa Stefania in Sanremo
- Click on the map for a fullscreen view

General information
- Location: Sanremo, Italy
- Coordinates: 43°48′56.2″N 7°46′02.75″E

Villa Stefania, also known as Villa Stefania Bevilacqua Marsaglia, is a historic villa located in Sanremo, Italy.

== History ==
The villa was built in 1896 and designed by Italian architect Pio Soli. It was commissioned by engineer Giovanni Marsaglia to celebrate the marriage of his daughter Stefania to Bologna nobleman Lamberto Bevilacqua Ariosti.

== Description ==
The villa, which features a Second Empire style, has a mansard roof.

== Gallery ==
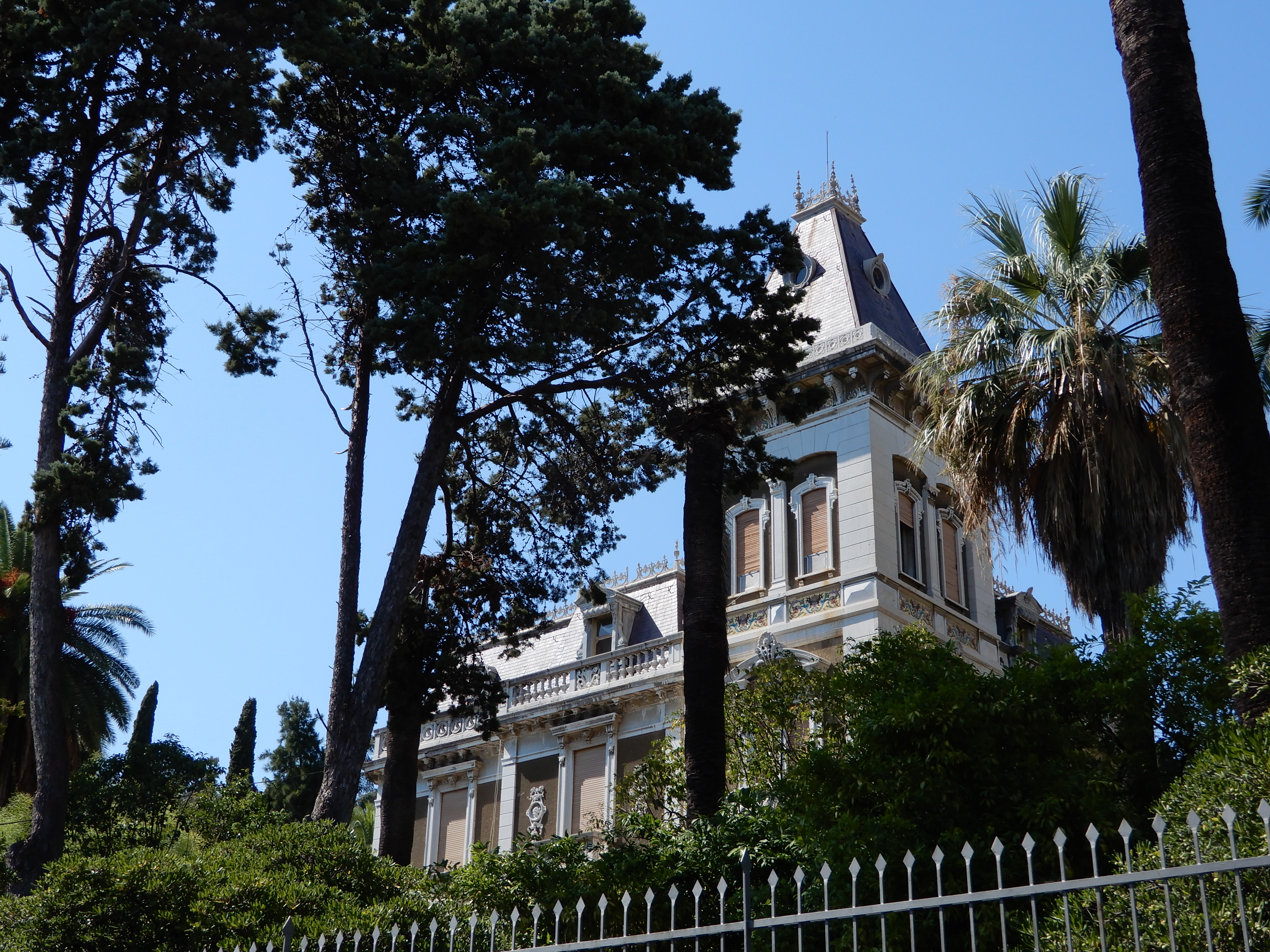

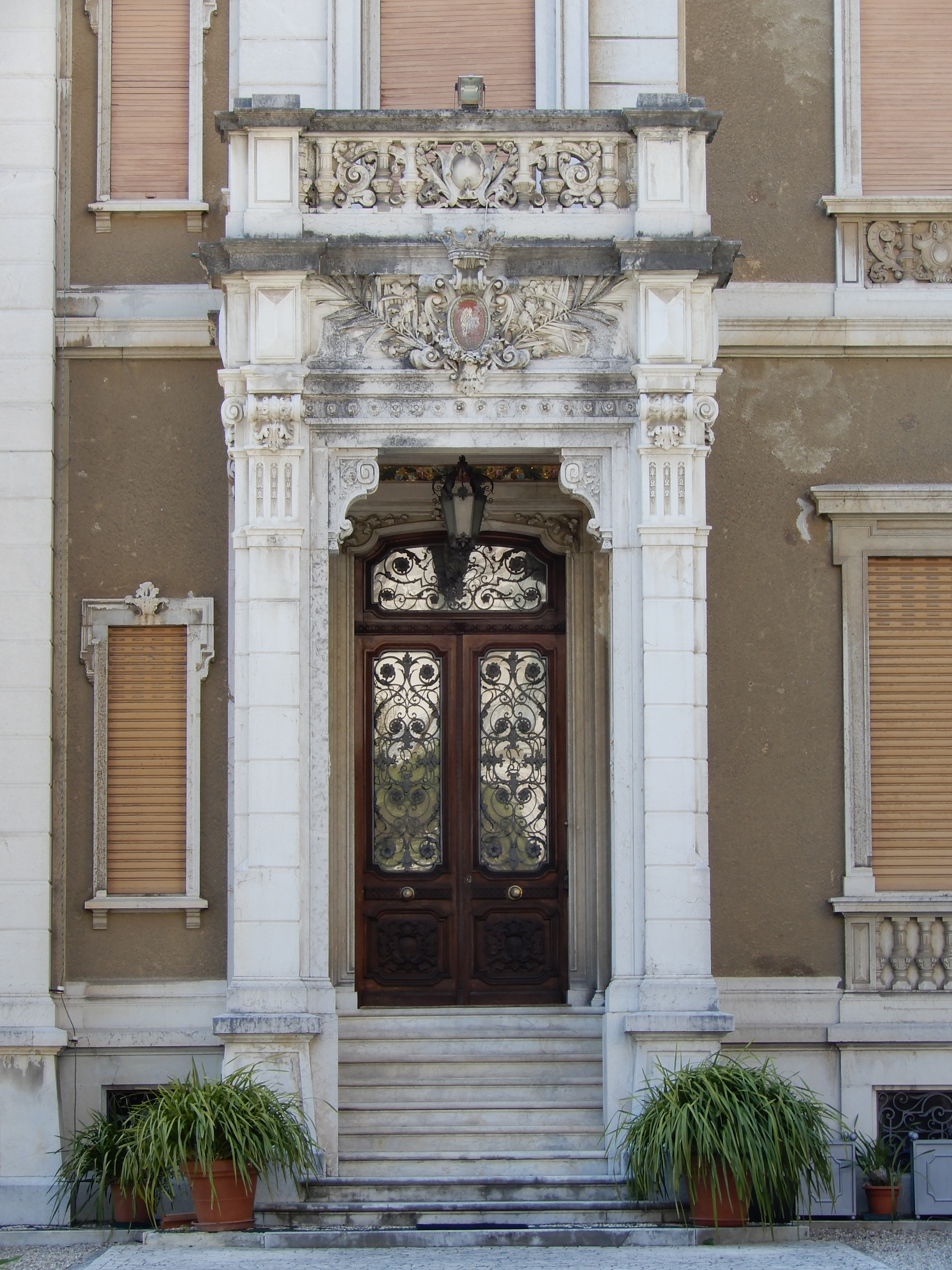

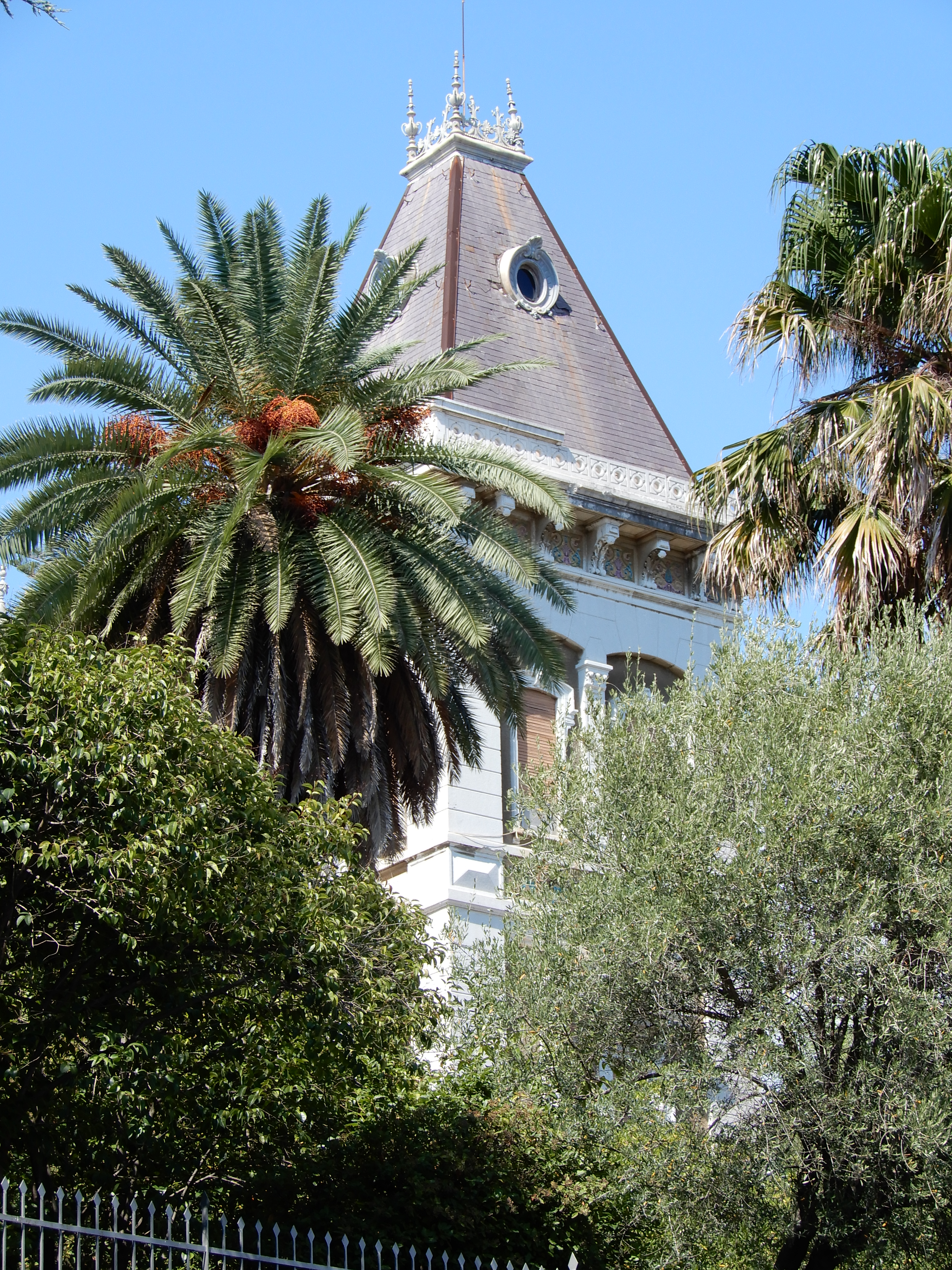
