= Villa Bel Respiro =

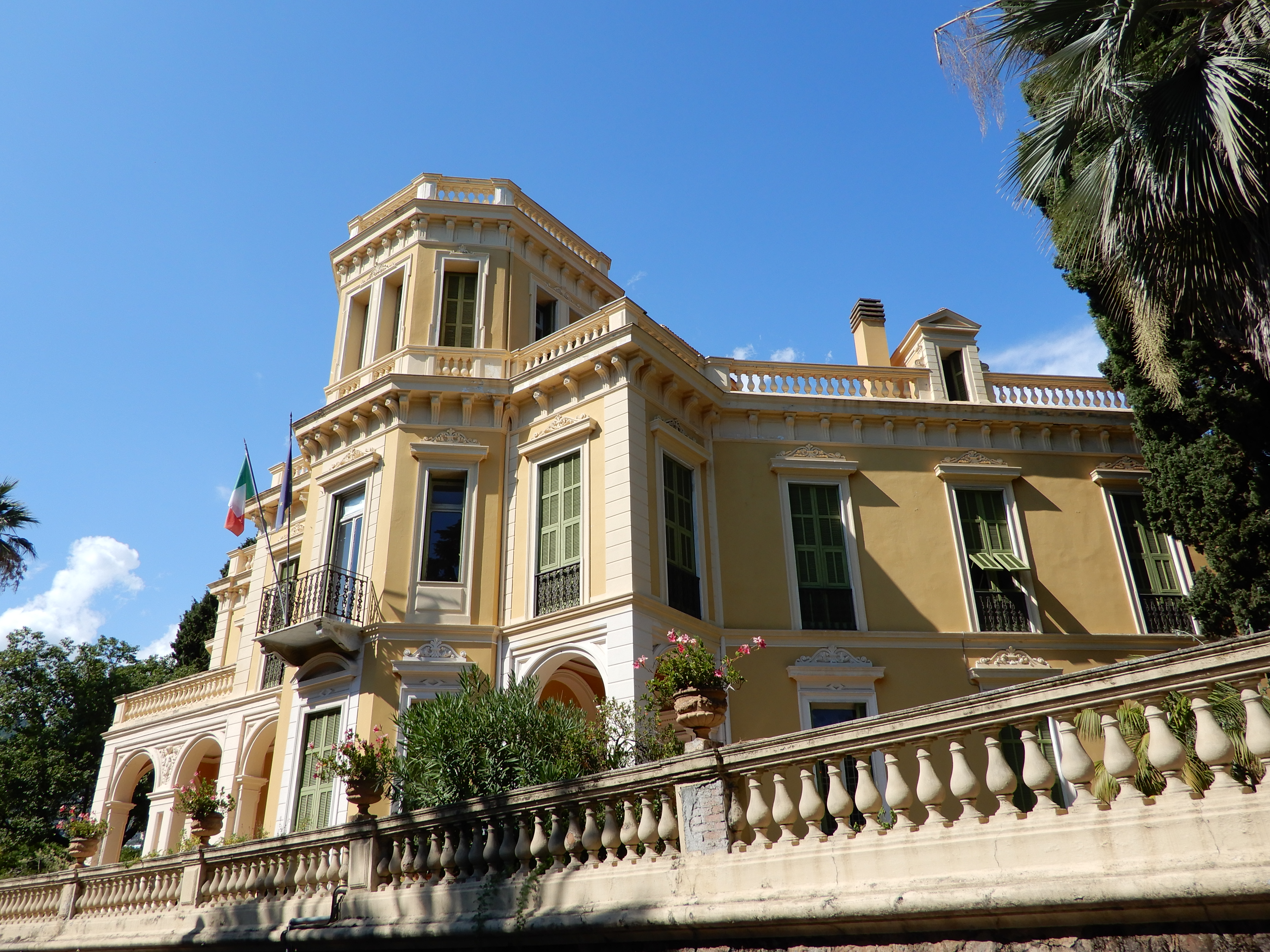
- Villa Bel Respiro in 2021
- Click on the map for a fullscreen view

General information
- Location: Sanremo, Italy
- Coordinates: 43°49′01.14″N 7°45′29.75″E

Villa Bel Respiro is a historic villa located in Sanremo, Italy.

== History ==
The villa, designed by architect Pio Soli, was built in 1893. The property belonged for some time to a British antique collector, and was later purchased in 1918 by Count Paolo Ruggeri Laderchi, who, during the 1930s, organized frequent receptions there, hosting the most prominent personalities visiting Sanremo. The villa remained his property until his death in 1940.

Since 1953, it has housed the headquarters of the Experimental Institute for Floriculture.

== Description ==
The villa stands along Corso degli Inglesi and features an eclectic style with Neo-Renaissance influences. The structure is characterized by protruding wings, loggias, and terraces.

== Gallery ==
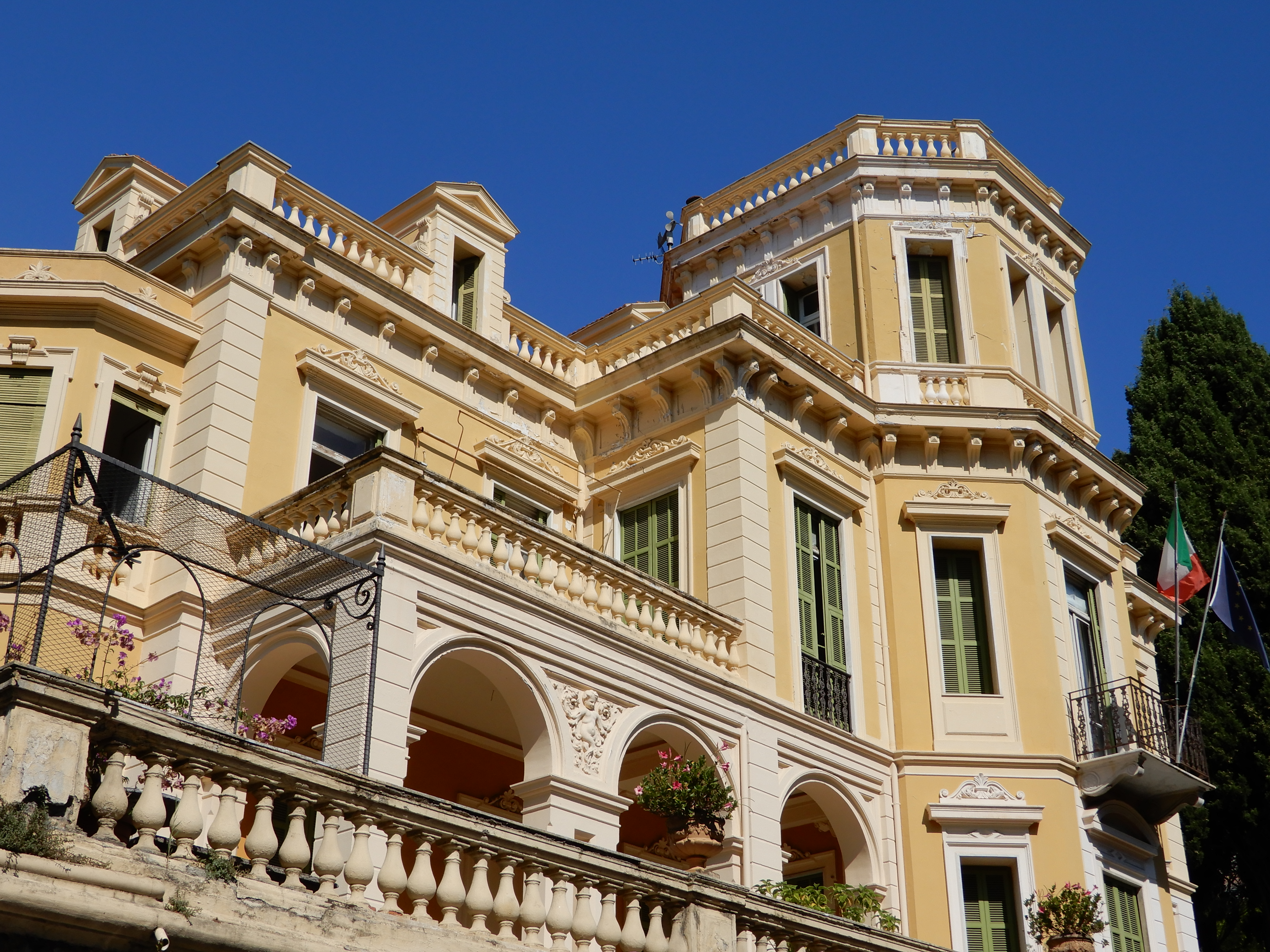

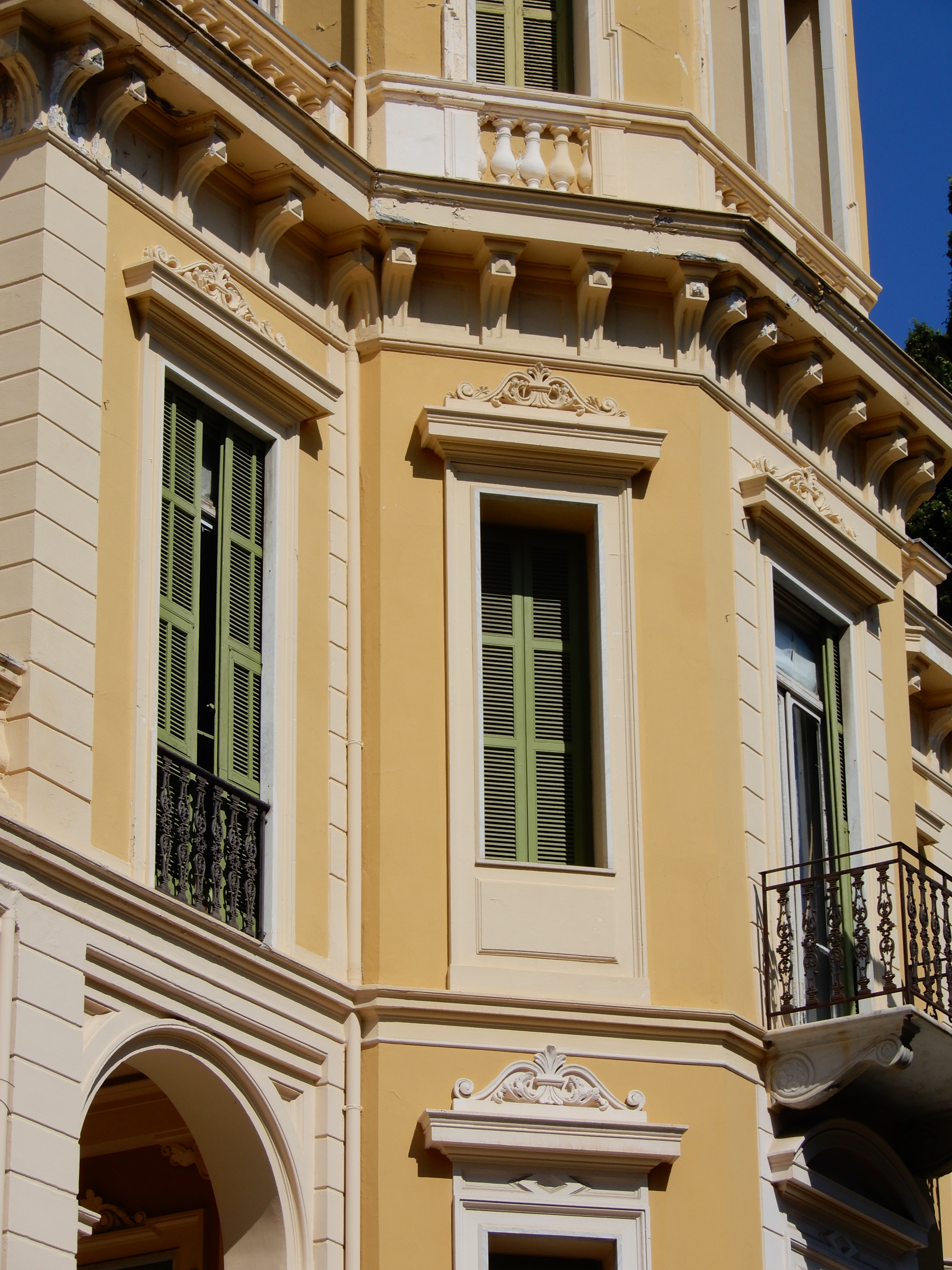

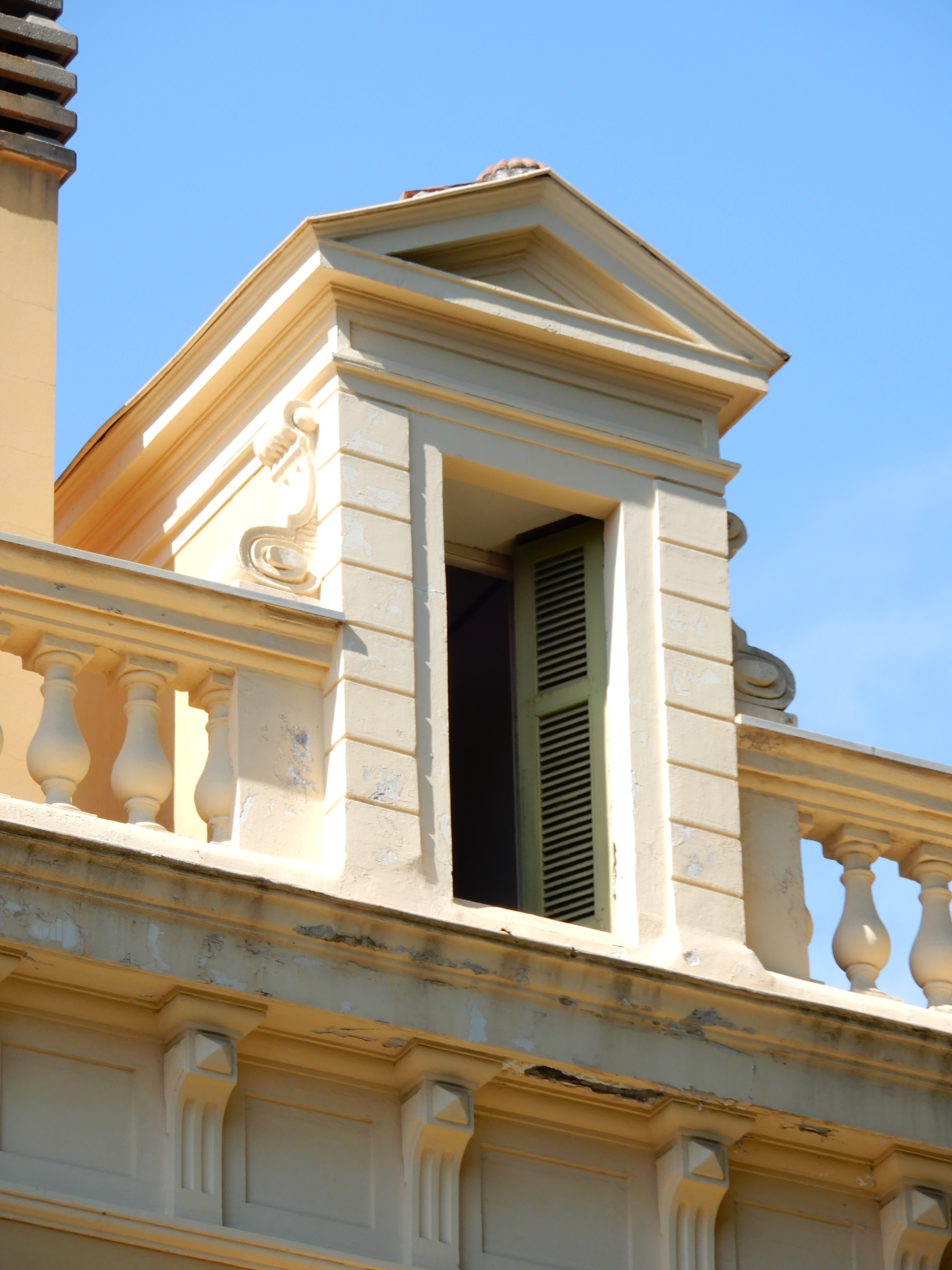
