= Villa Nobel =

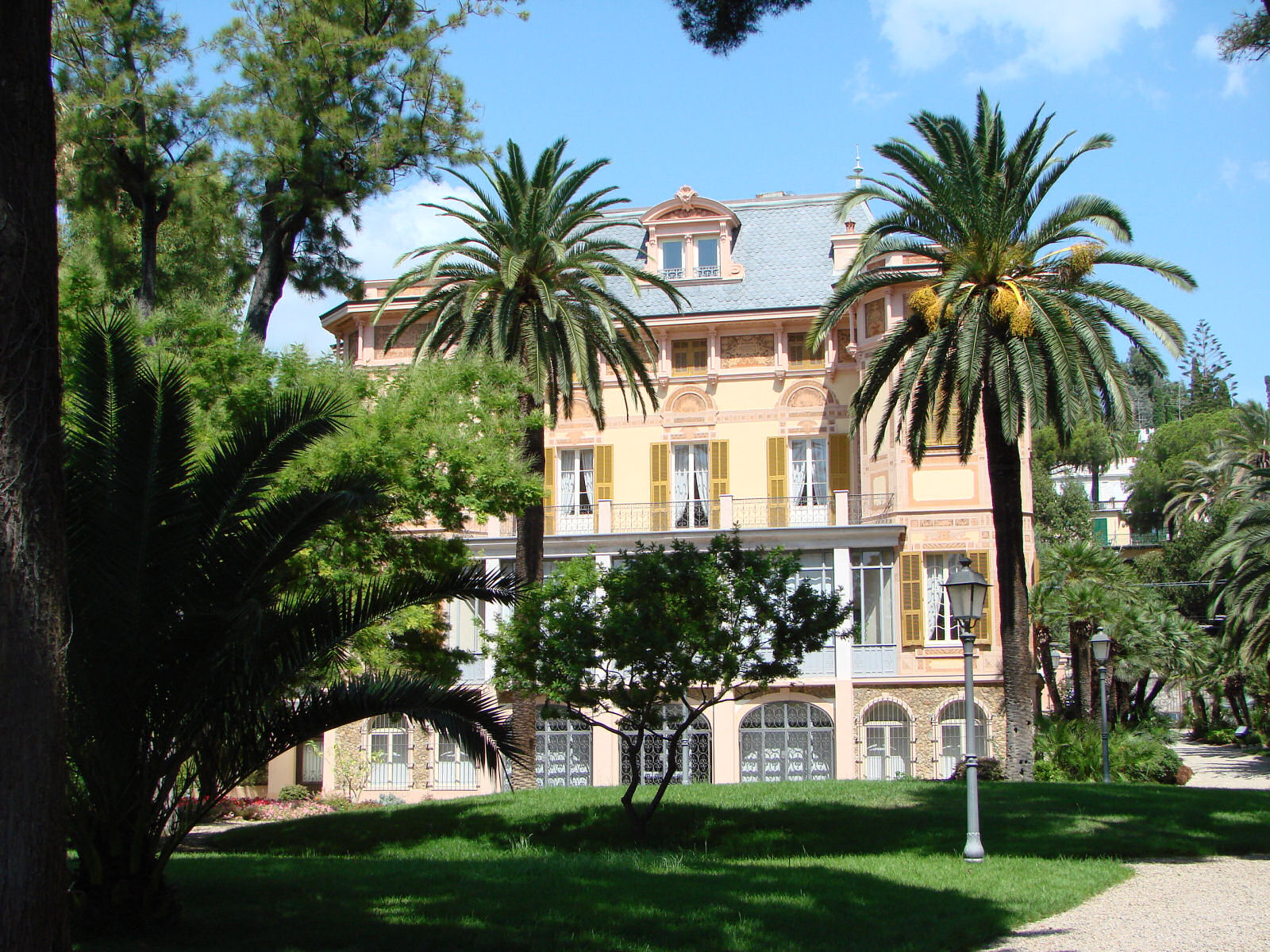
- Villa Nobel in Sanremo
- Click on the map for a fullscreen view

General information
- Location: Sanremo, Italy
- Coordinates: 43°49′16.56″N 7°47′33.97″E

Villa Nobel is a historic villa located in Sanremo, Italy, once owned by Alfred Nobel.

== History ==
Villa Nobel, built in 1871 and located on Corso Cavallotti in Sanremo, was commissioned by Rivoli pharmacist Pietro Vacchieri, who had purchased the land there a year earlier. It was designed by architect Filippo Grossi. On July 28, 1874, Vacchieri sold the property to Genoese knight Lazzaro Patrone, whose heir in turn resold it to Swedish scientist Alfred Nobel in 1891.

In 1892, Nobel commissioned architect Pio Soli to completely renovate the villa. A new floor and a mansard roof were thus added. Alfred Nobel lived in the villa the last years of his life, and died there on December 10, 1896.

== Description ==
The villa originally featured a Moorish Revival style. Later renovations accentuated the extravagance of the building.

== Gallery ==
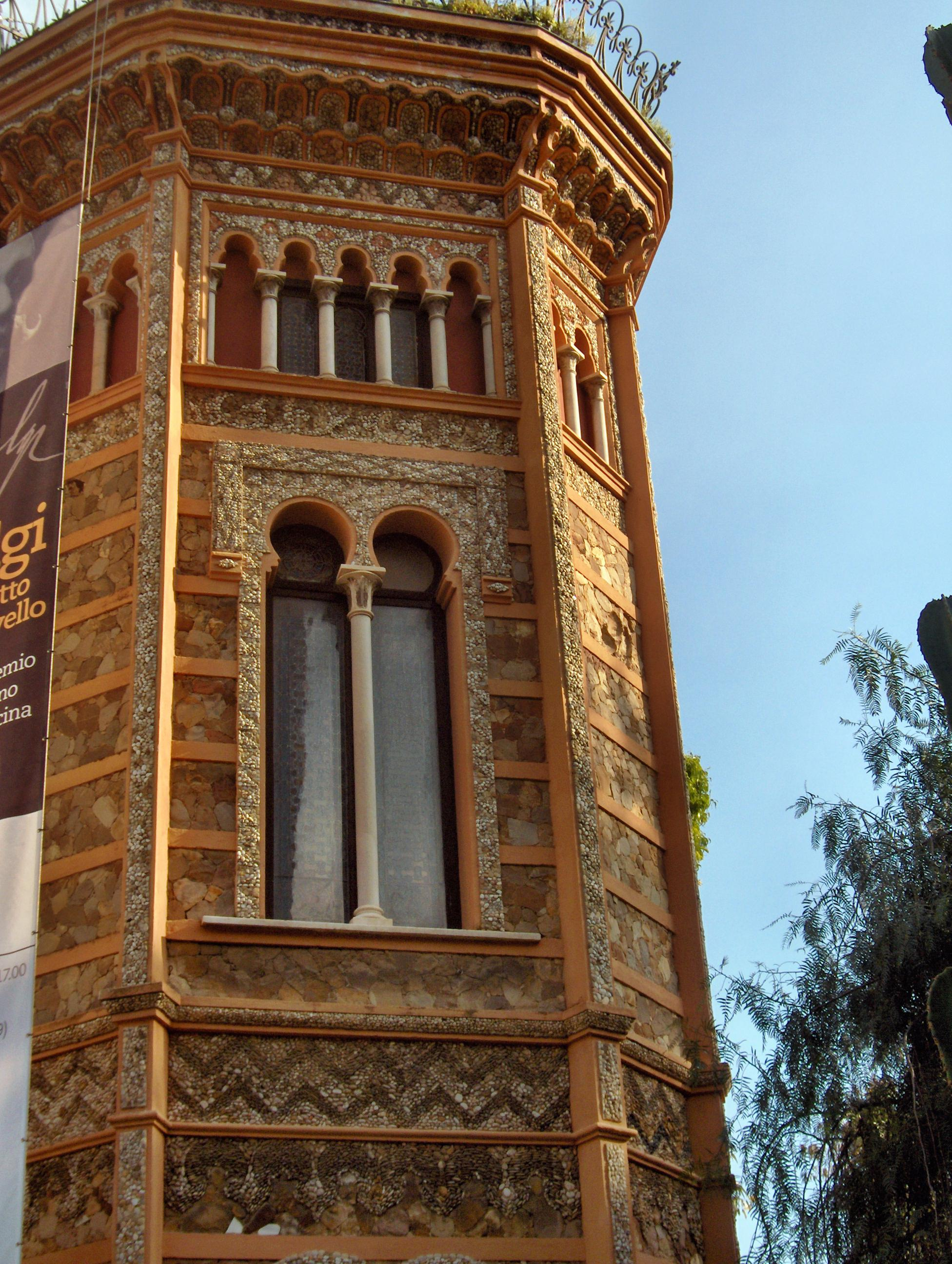

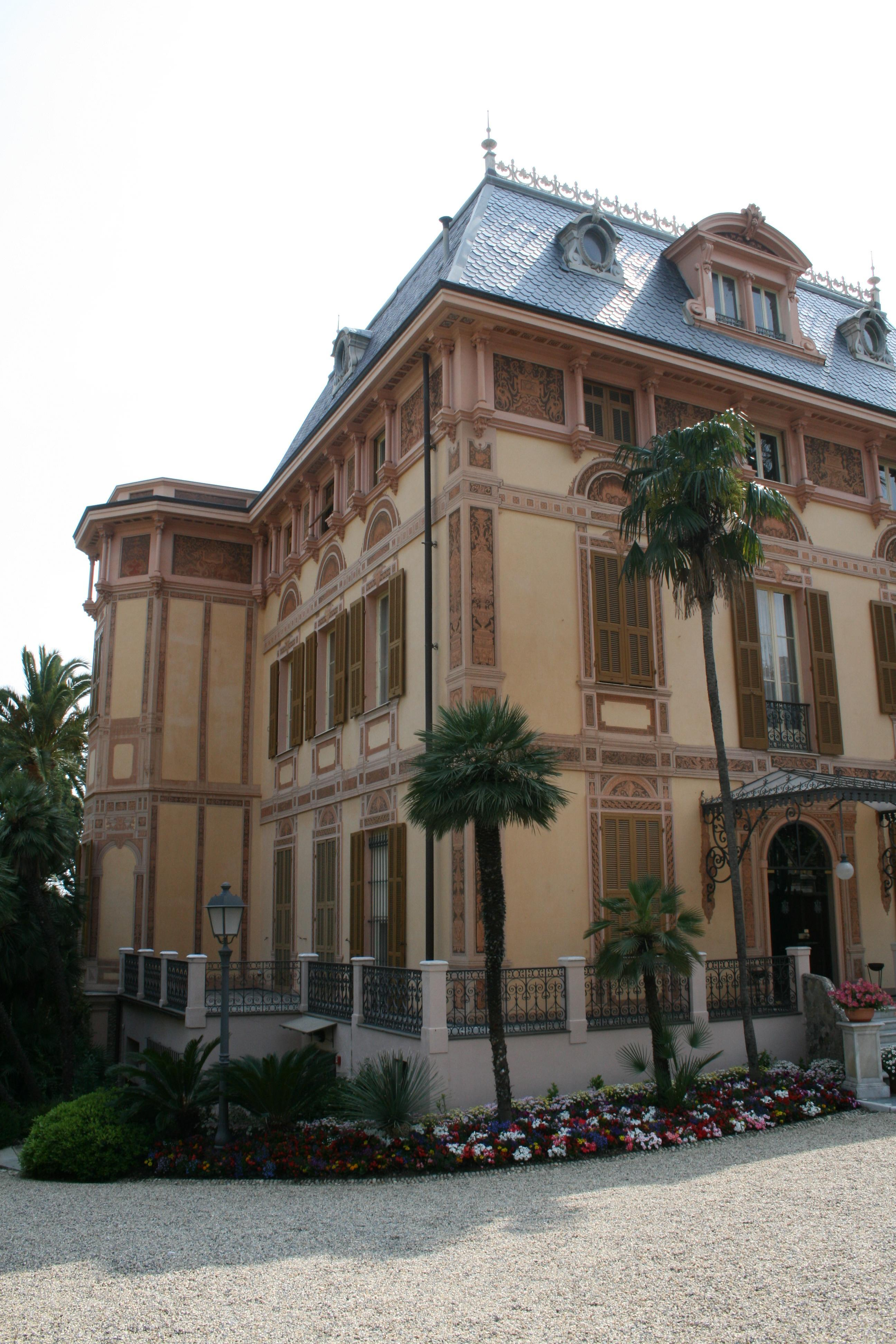

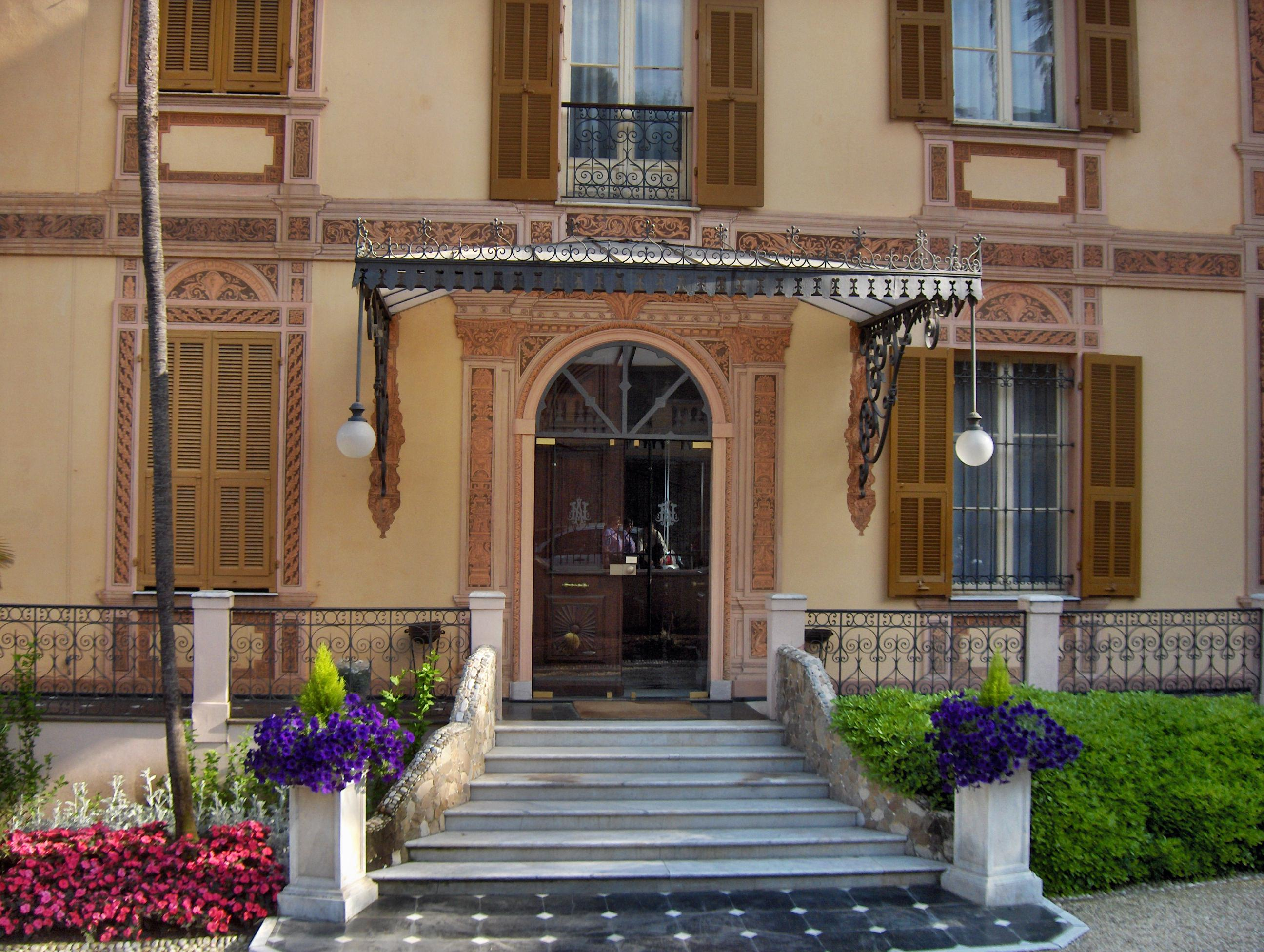
