= Pio Soli =

Italian architect

- Born: 1847; Castelnuovo Scrivia
- Died: 21 May 1906 (aged 58–59); Sanremo
- Occupation: Architect

Pio Soli (1847 – 21 May 1906) was an Italian architect. He primarily worked in the town of Sanremo on the Italian Riviera, designing numerous elegant villas that still characterize the town to this day.

== Biography ==
Soli was from Castelnuovo Scrivia, where he was born on March 22, 1847, to Antonio and Maria Corni. He later settled in Sanremo, where he arrived as the trusted architect of Giovanni Marsaglia.

In his work, he was a follower of the French architect Charles Garnier, who had long been operating in the nearby town of Bordighera.

His works include, among others, Villa Nobel (1892), Villa Bel Respiro (1893), Villa Stefania (1896), and Villa del Sole (1898).
