= Musei di Strada Nuova =

Art museums in Genoa, Italy

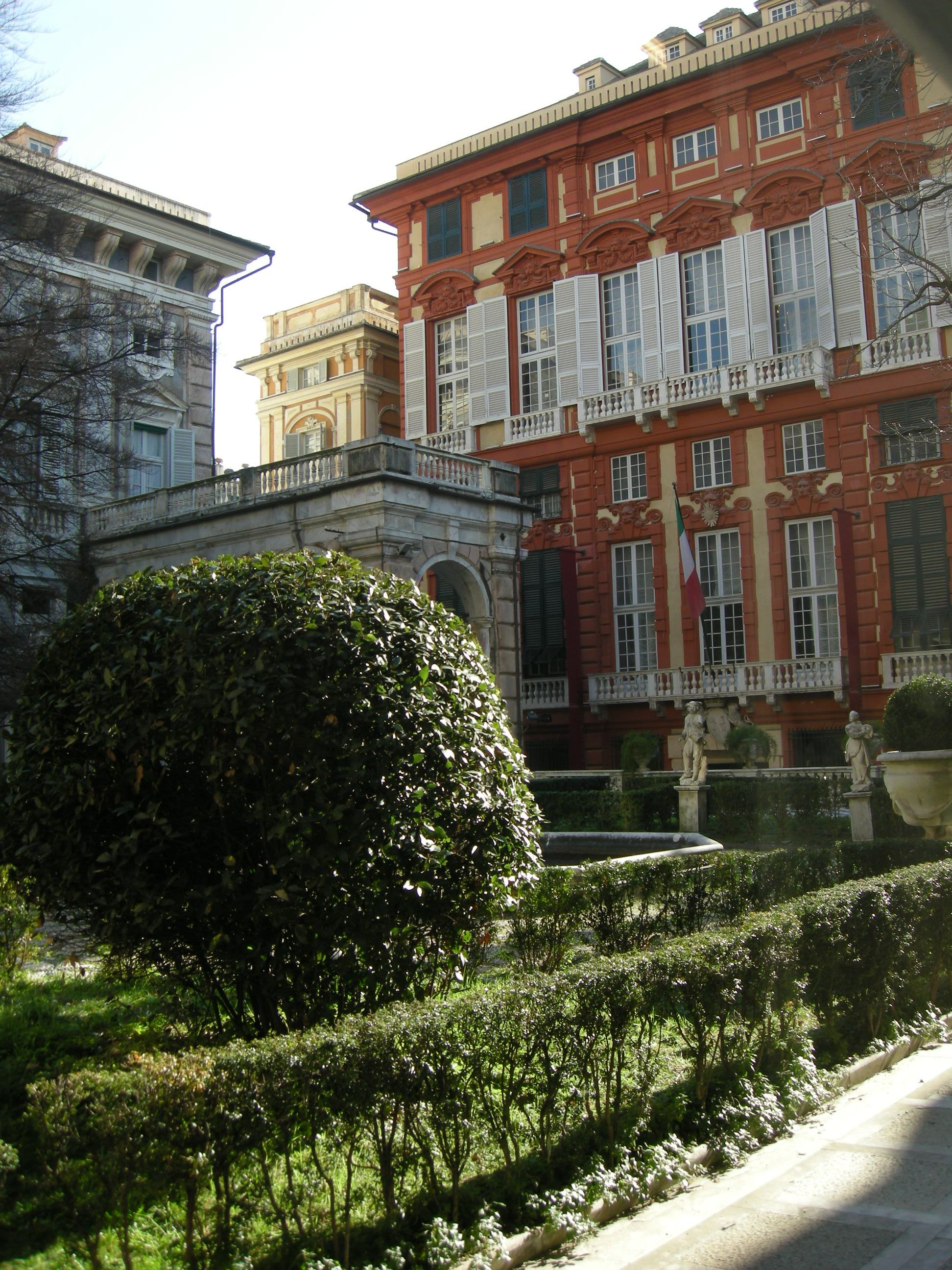
- The Palazzo Rosso seen from the Palazzo Bianco
- Interactive fullscreen map
- Location: Genoa, Italy
- Coordinates: 44°24′41″N 8°55′56″E

The Musei di Strada Nuova is the main art gallery in the Italian city of Genoa and comprises three museums which together form a single complex, housed in three adjacent historical buildings: Palazzo Rosso, Palazzo Bianco and Palazzo Tursi, located at the end of monumental Via Garibaldi (formerly Strada Nuova). Palazzo Tursi is also Genoa's city hall.

The unified collection was founded in 2004 with the decision to create a single visitor route linking all three palaces, all with a single owner. Palazzo Rosso and Palazzo Bianco had already been independent museums since 1874 and 1892 respectively, whilst parts of Palazzo Tursi had been given over to cultural uses since 2004. The route begins with 15th–20th century paintings in the Palazzo Rosso, followed by art produced in Genoa and Liguria by Spanish, Flemish and Italian artists from the 15th century onwards in the Palazzo Bianco, and concludes in the Palazzo Tursi with Antonio Canova's Penitent Magdalene and the ceramic, numismatic and Paganini collections.

== Highlights ==
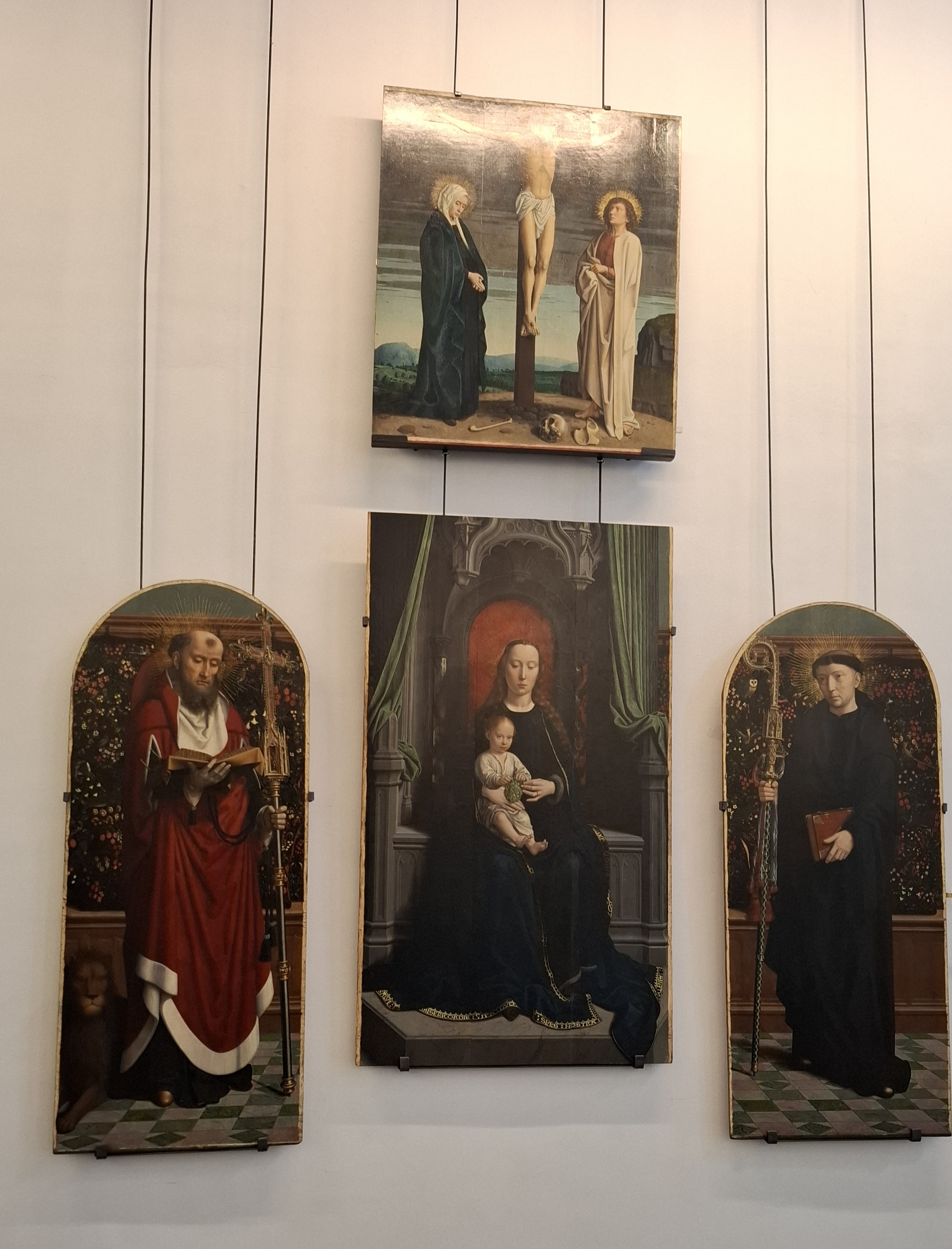
- Gerard David, Cervara Altarpiece
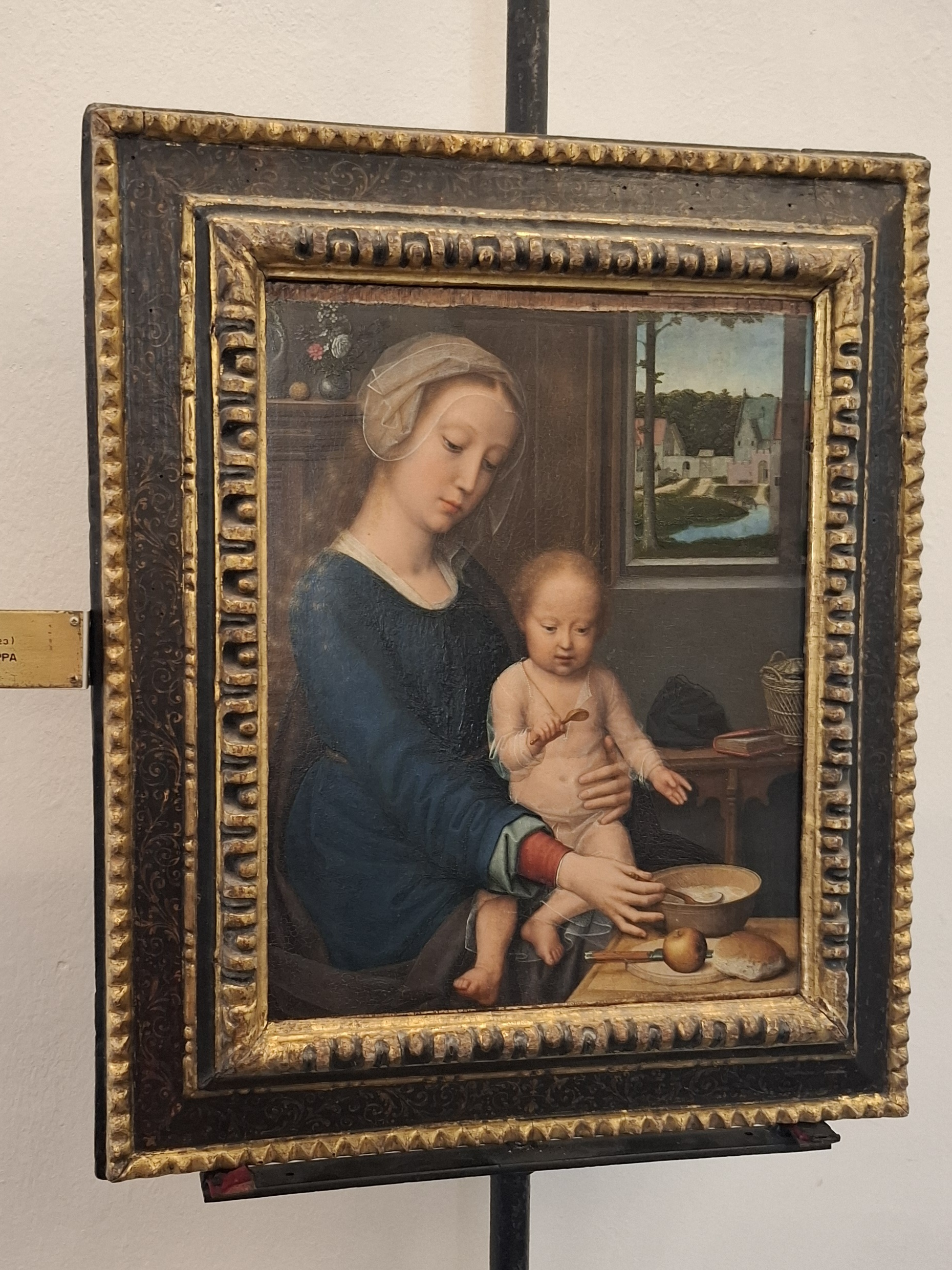
- Gerard David, Madonna and child with the milk soup
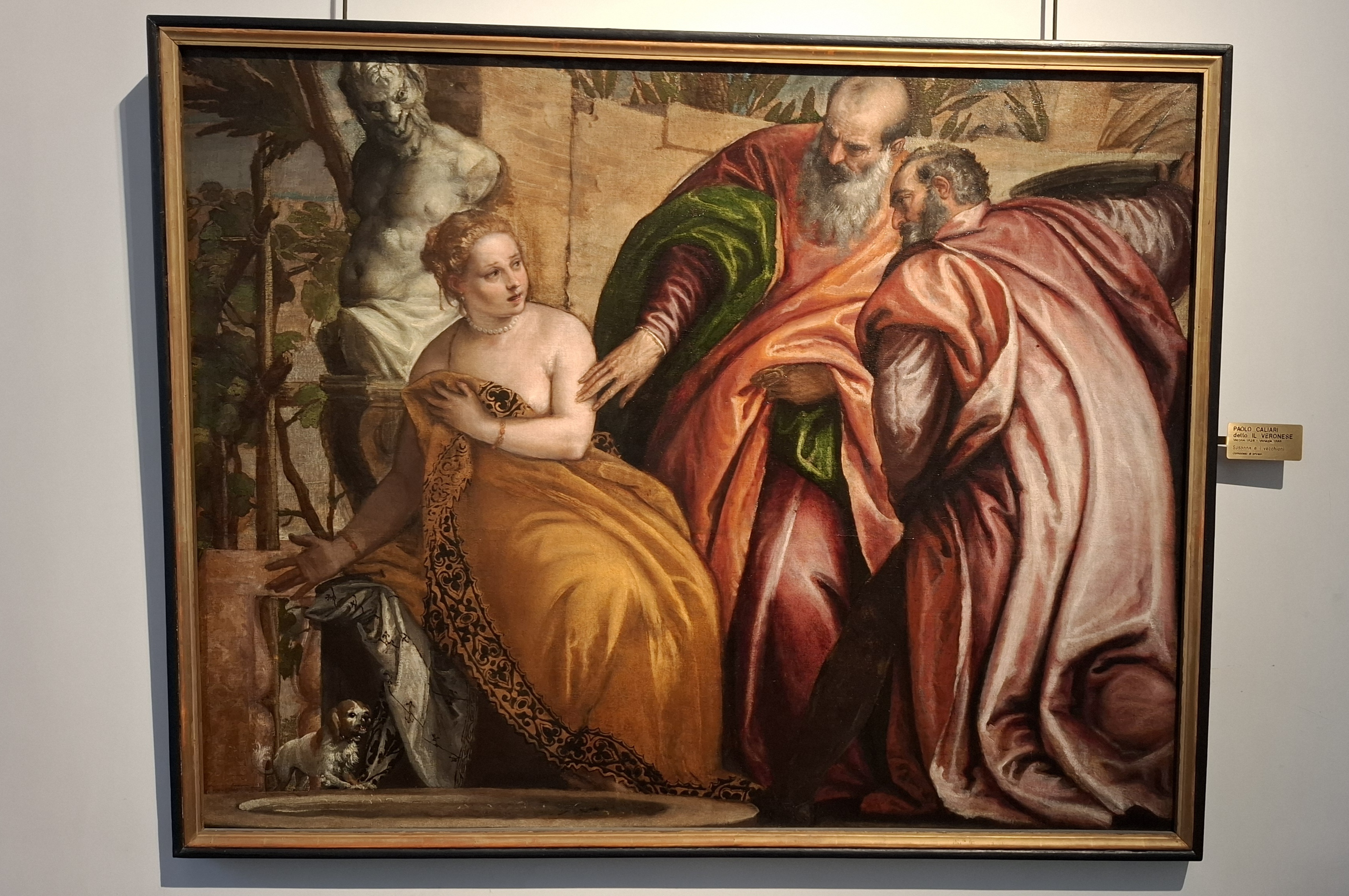
- Paolo Veronese, Susannah and the Elders
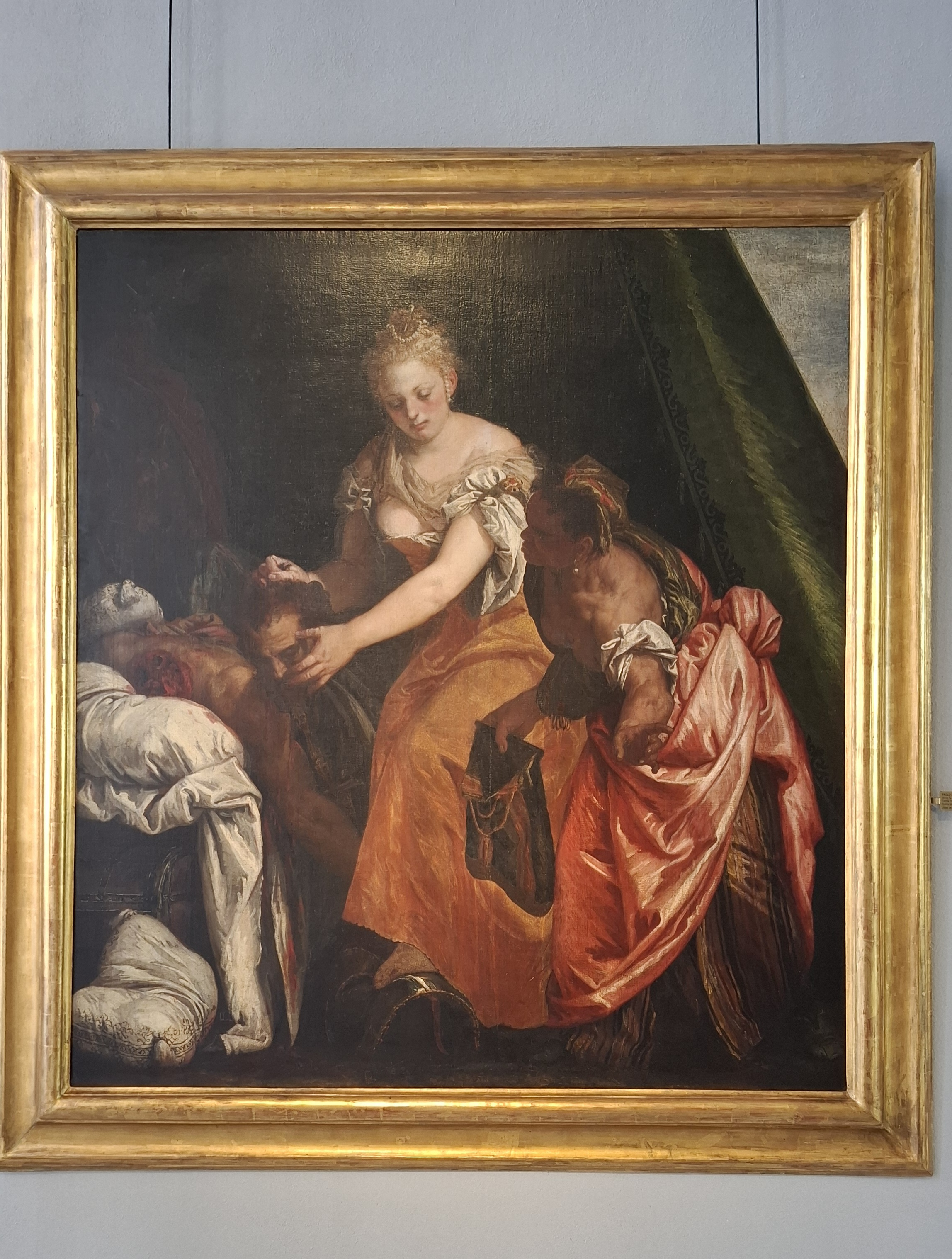
- Paolo Veronese, Judith beheading Holofernes
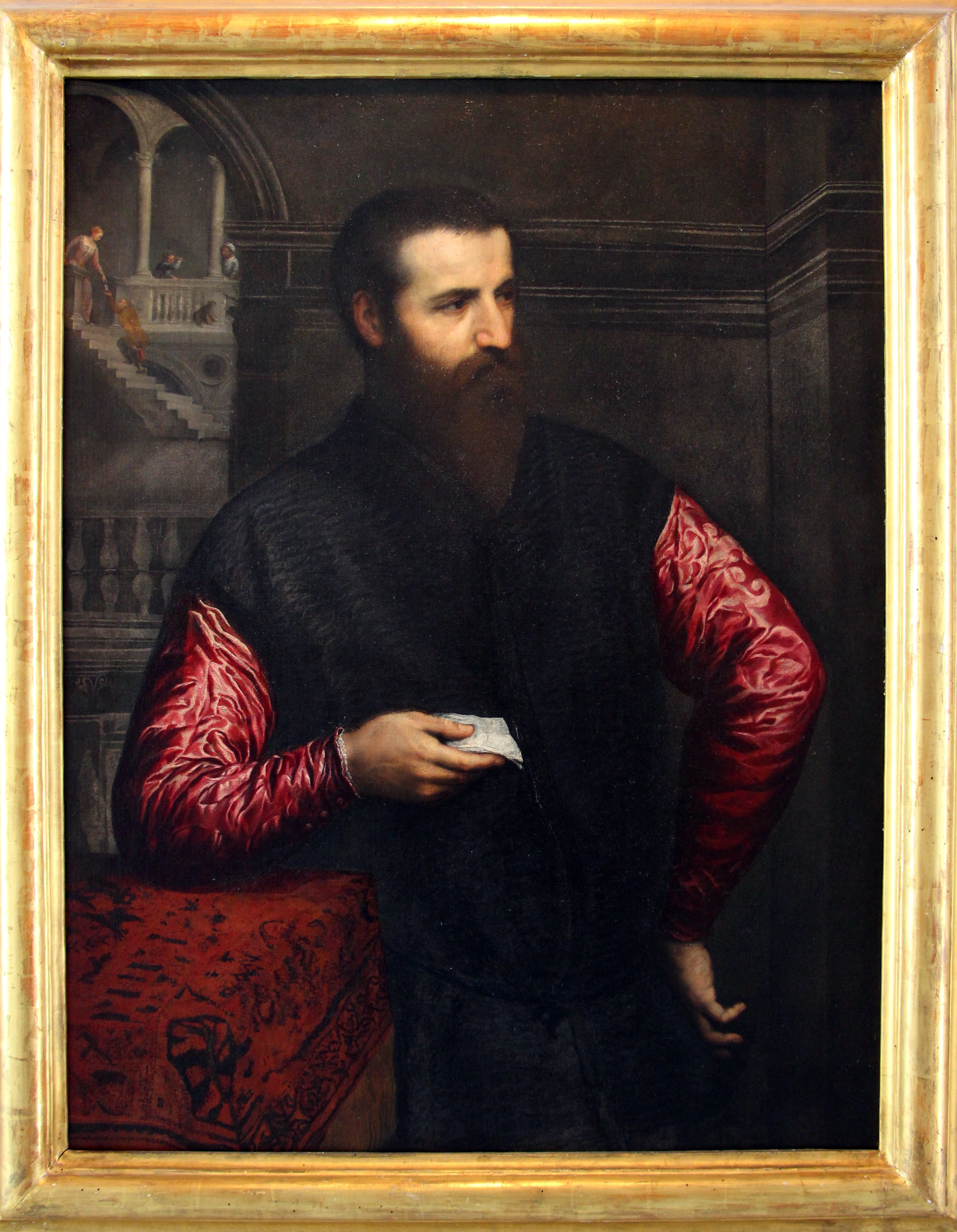
- Paris Bordone, Portrait of a man in red sleeves
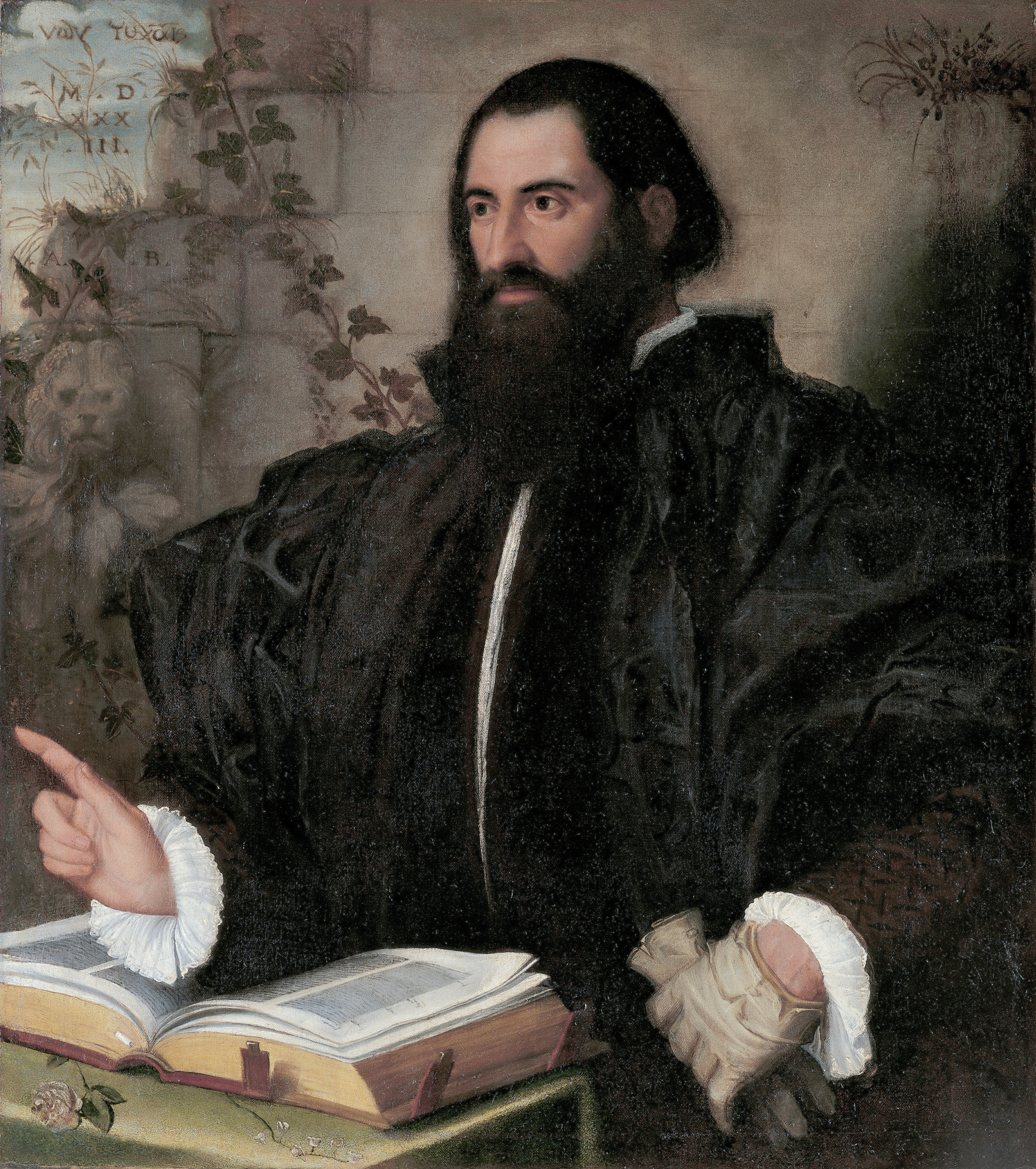
- Moretto da Brescia, Portrait of Pietro Andrea Mattioli
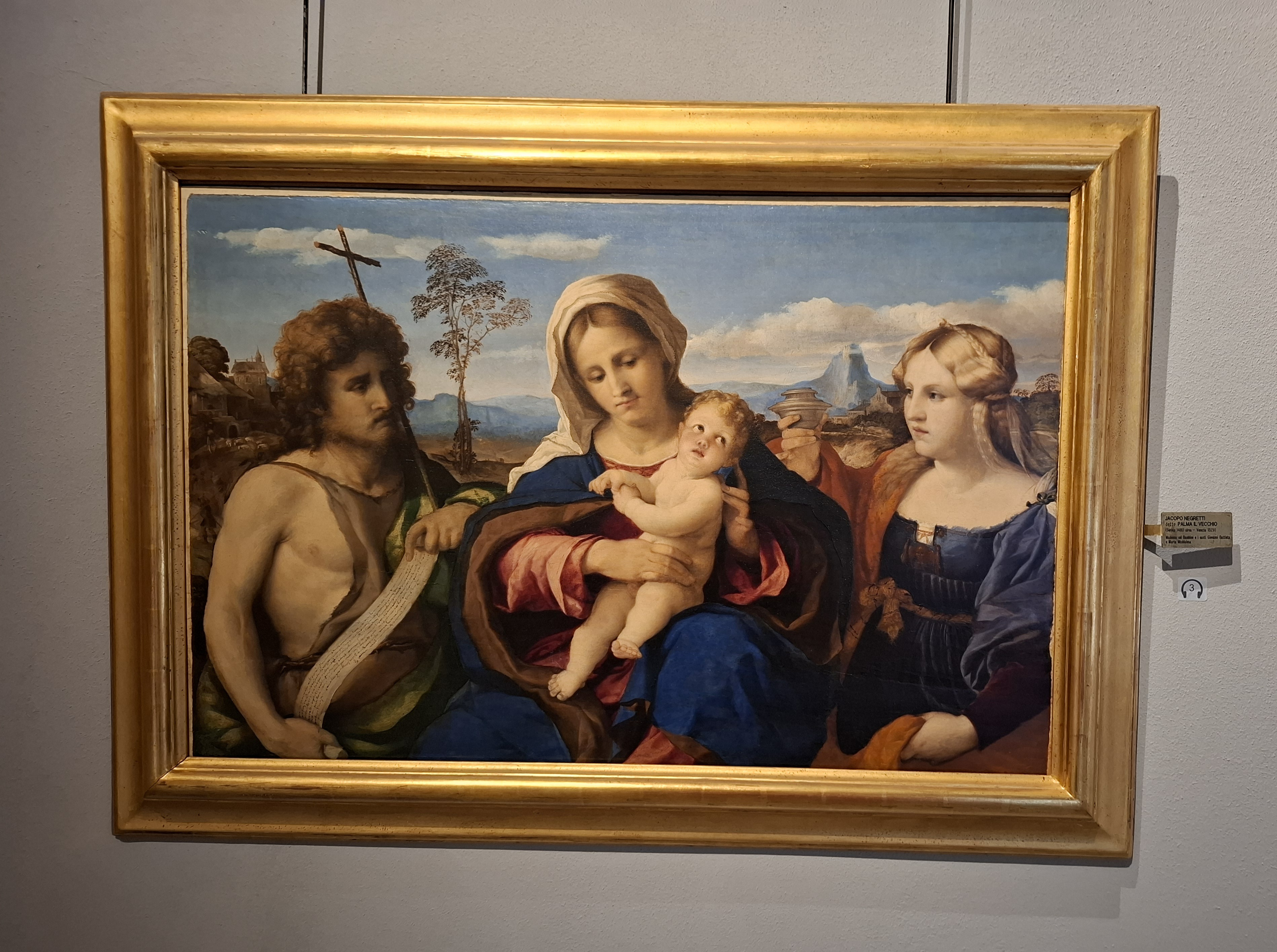
- Palma il Vecchio, Virgin and child between two saints
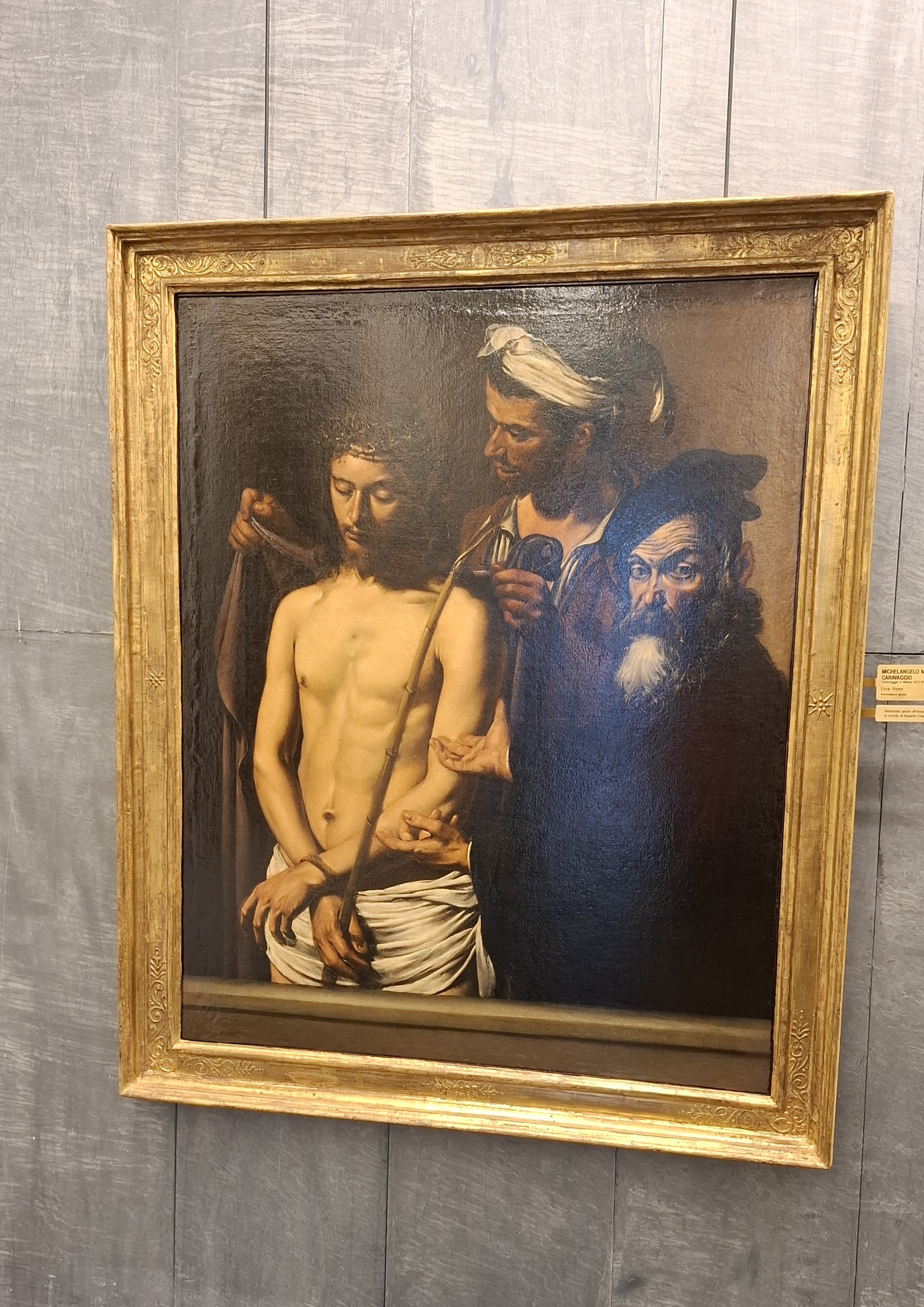
- Caravaggio, Ecce Homo
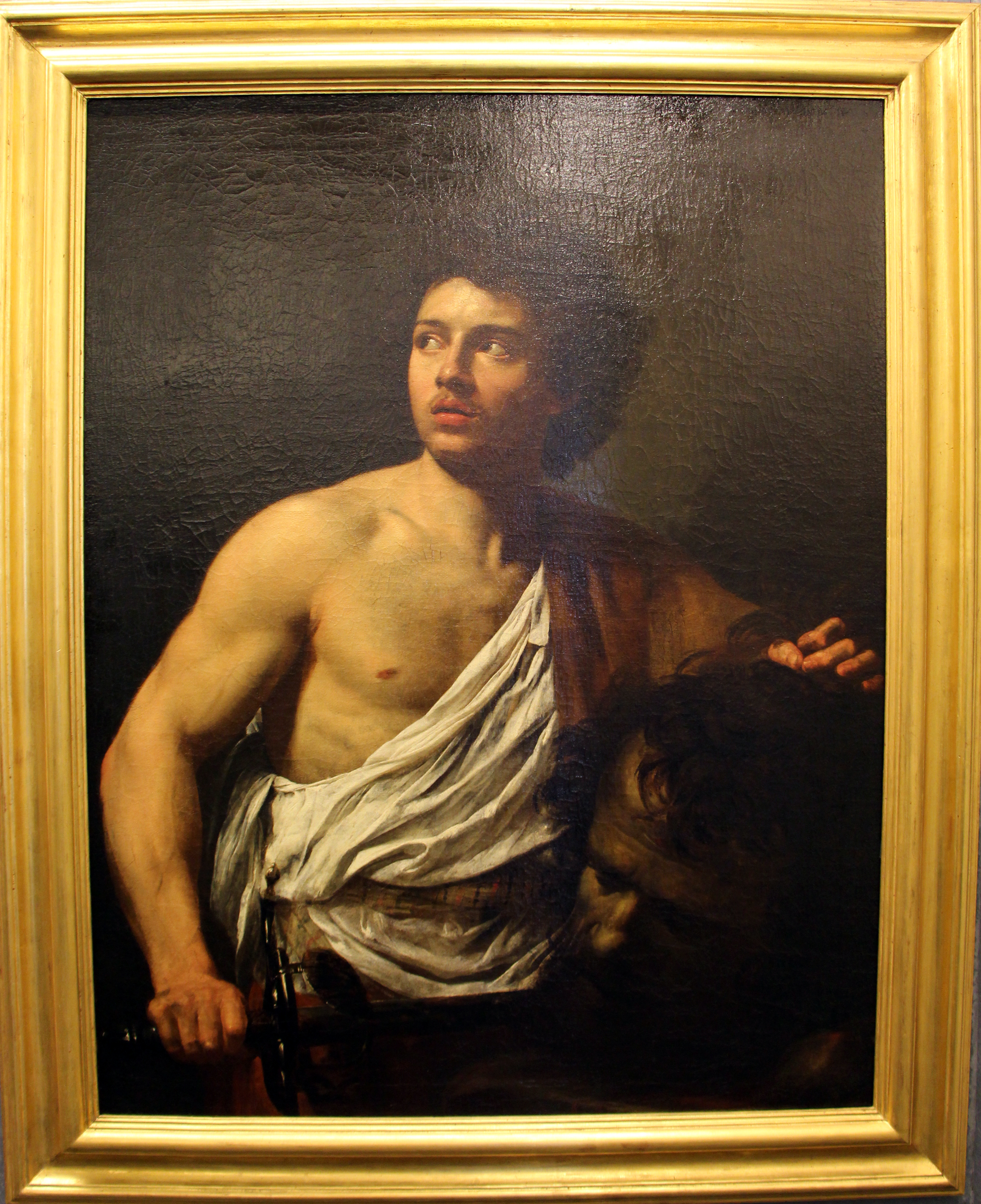
- Simon Vouet, David with the head of Goliath
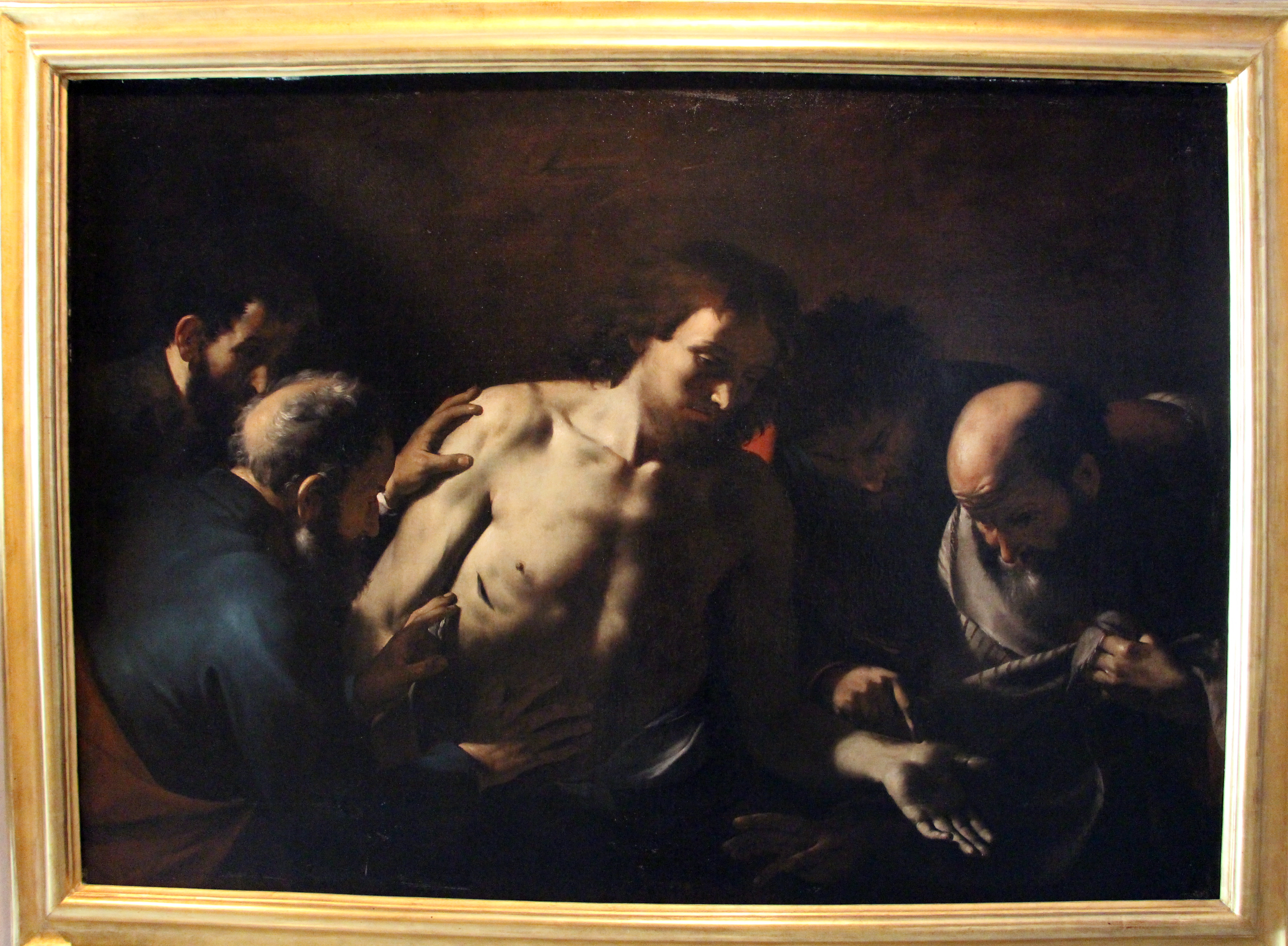
- Mattia Preti, The incredulity of Saint Thomas
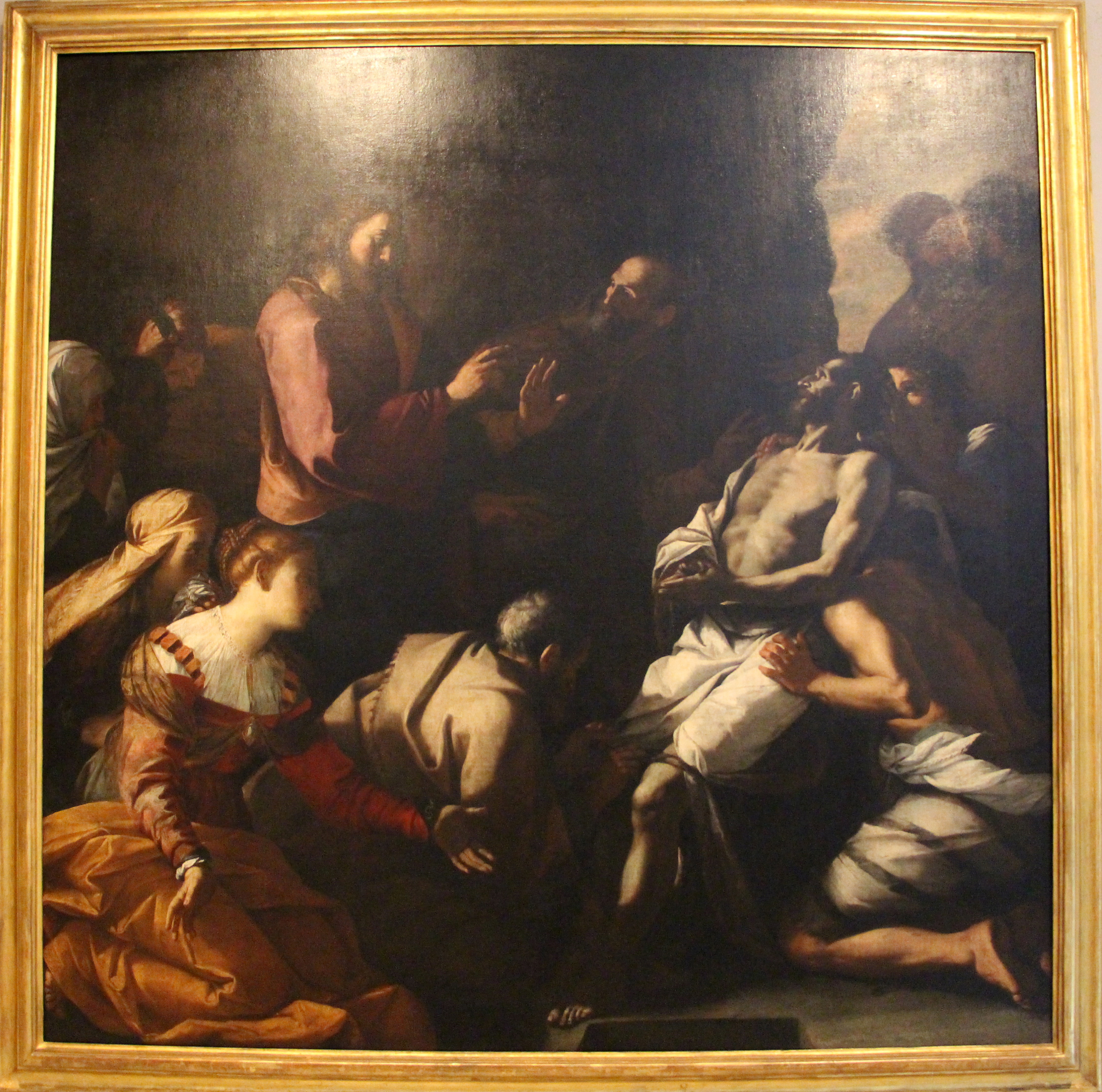
- Mattia Preti, The resurrection of Lazarus
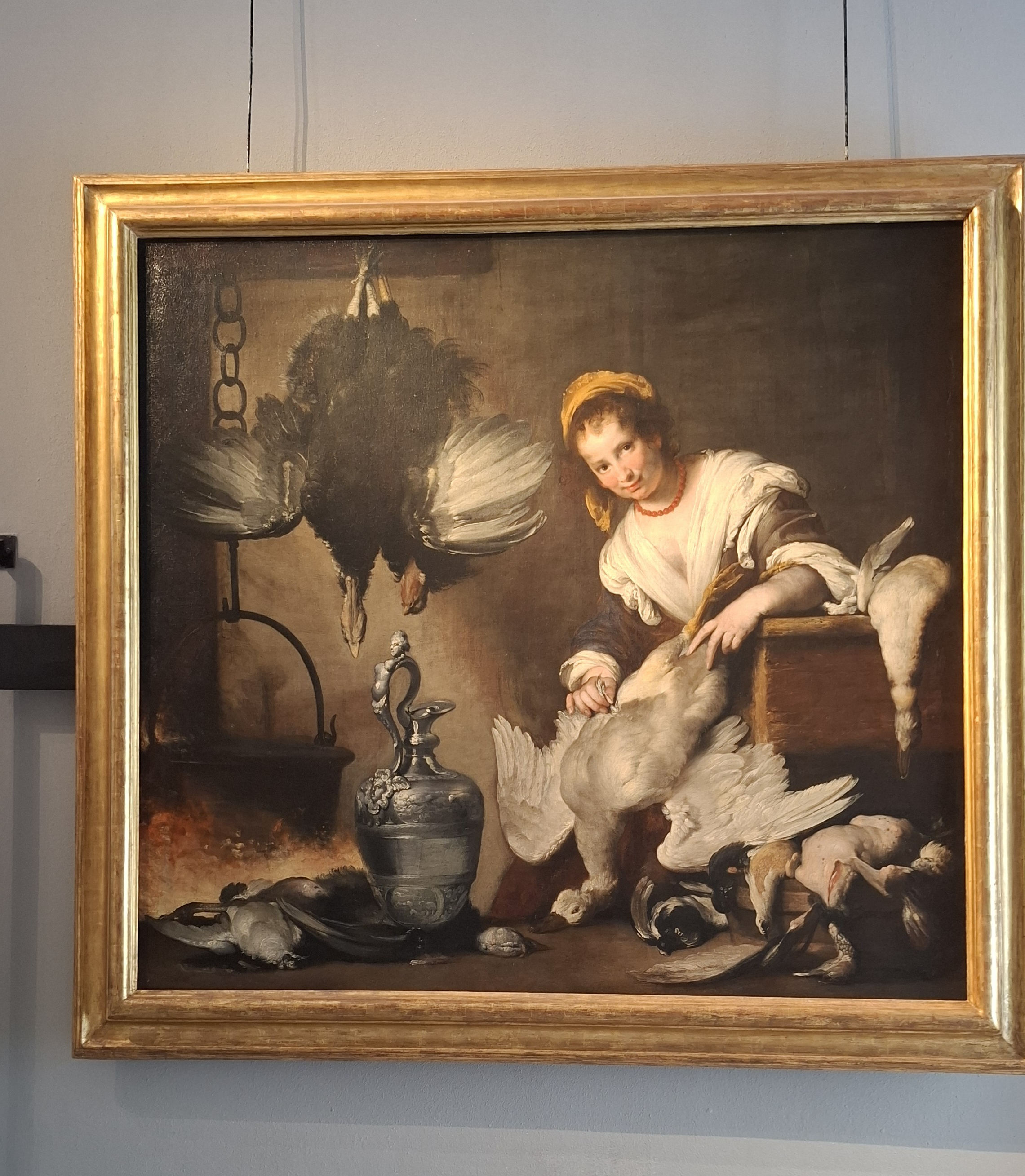
- Bernardo Strozzi, Woman Cooking
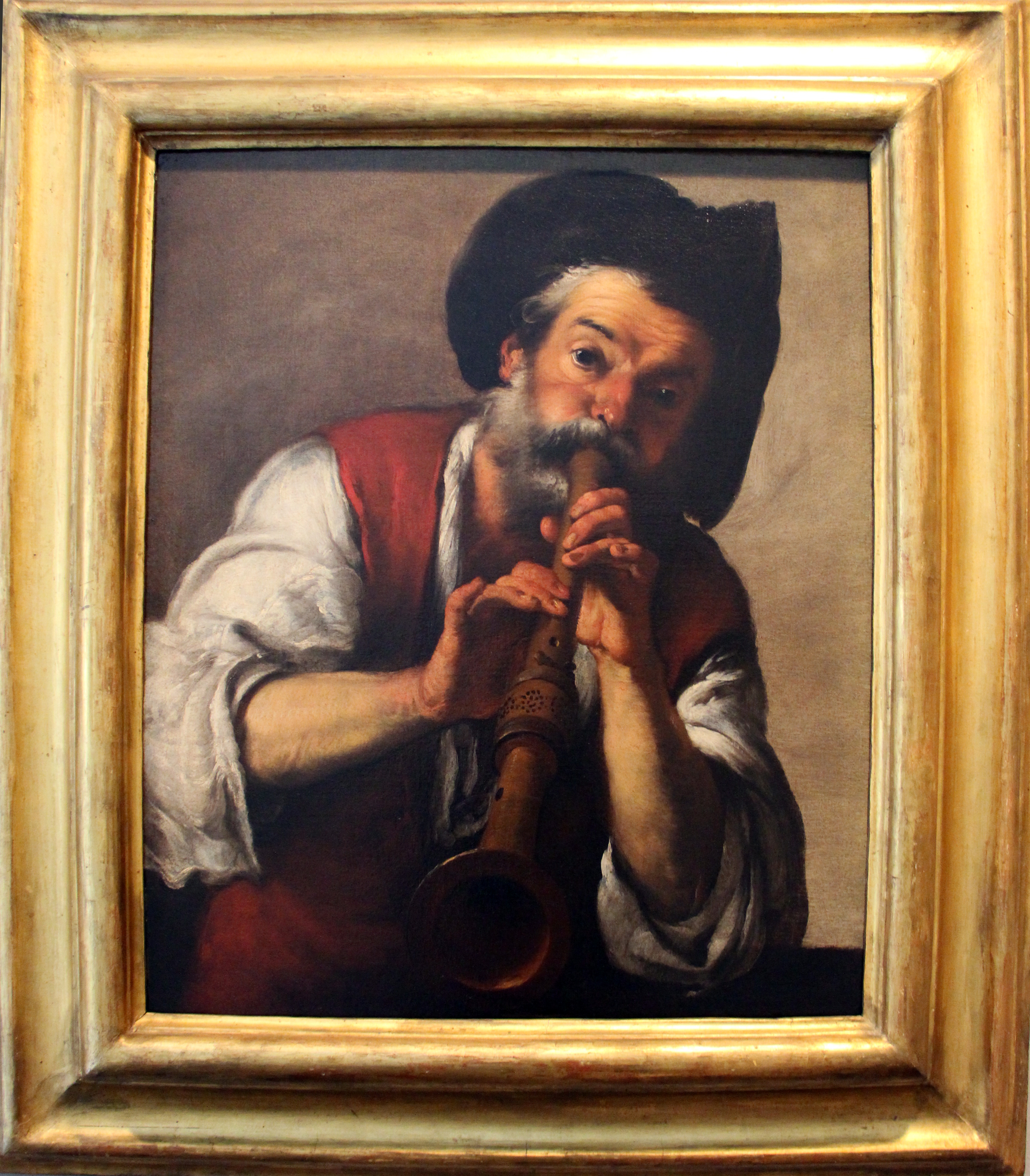
- Bernardo Strozzi, The piper
- Il Cannone Guarnerius
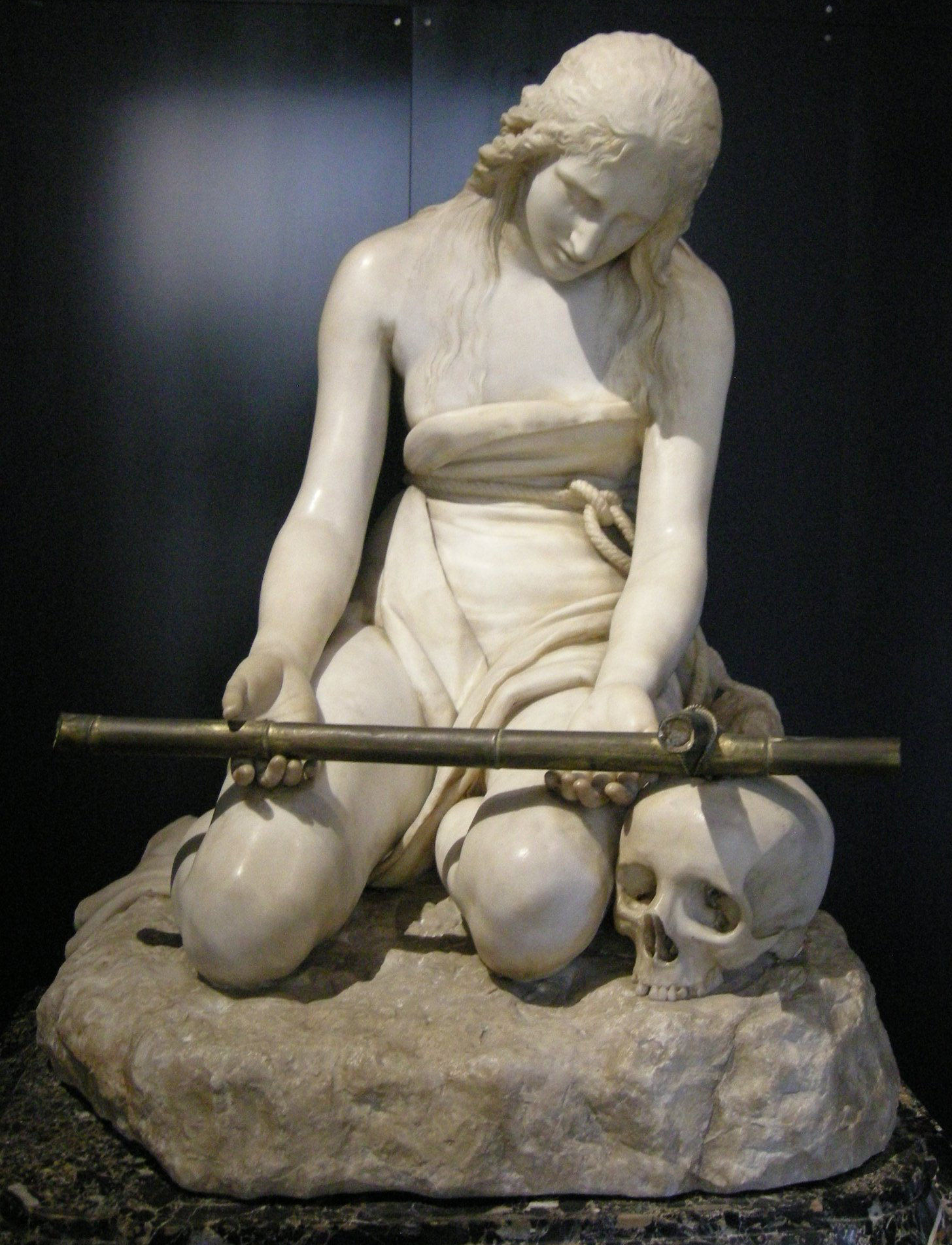
- Antonio Canova, Penitent Magdalene
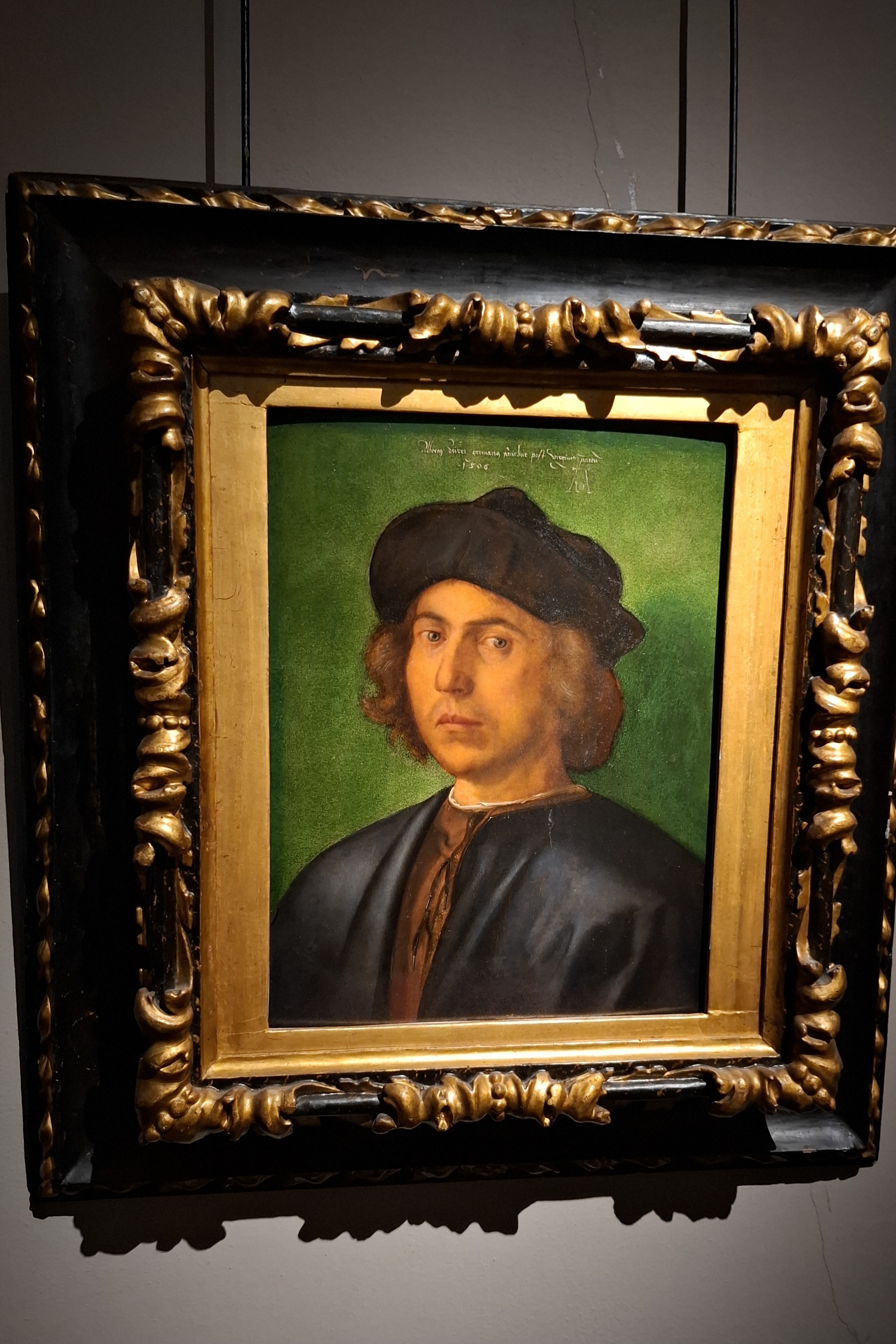
- Albrecht Dürer, Portrait of a young Venetian
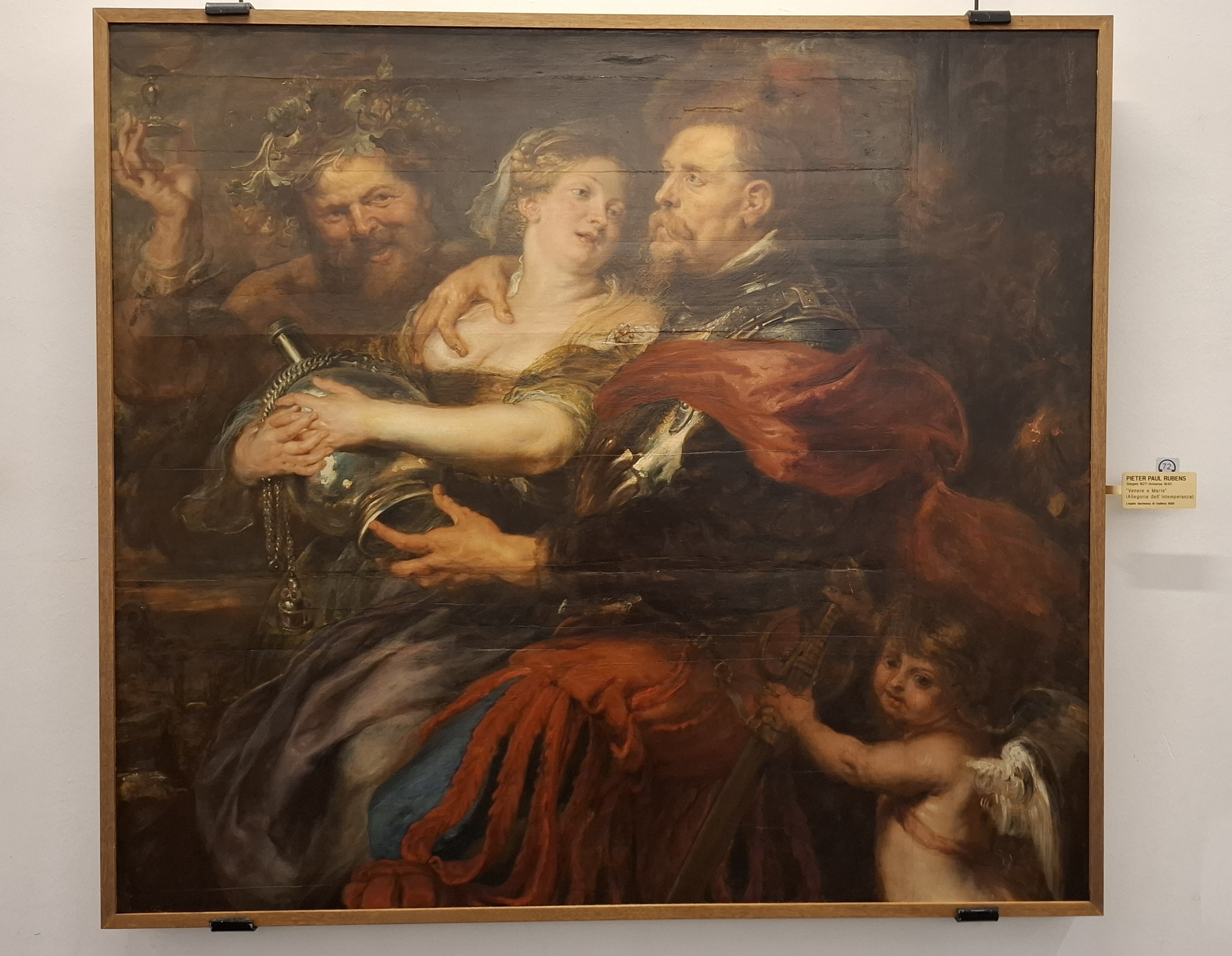
- Peter Paul Rubens, Venus and Mars
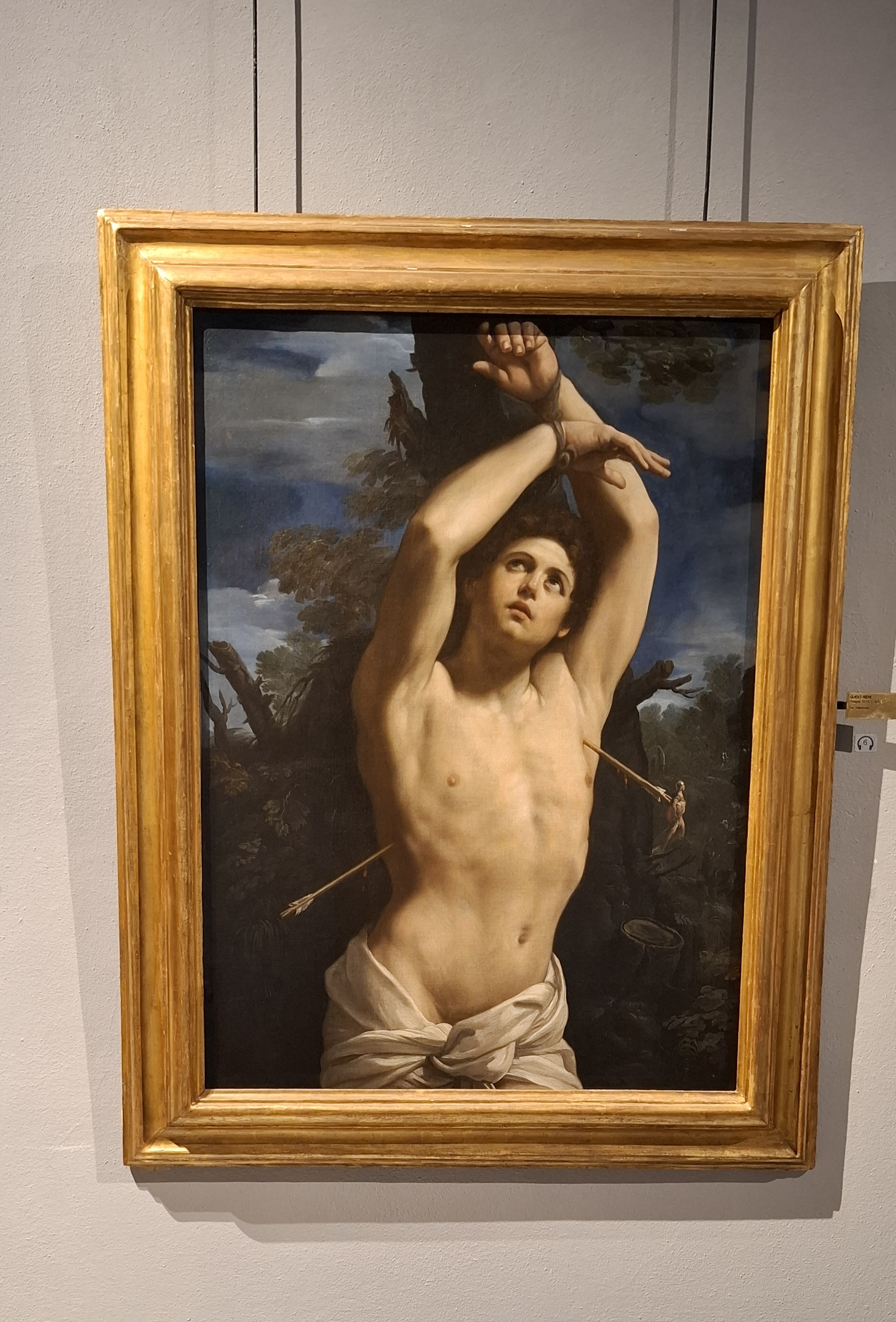
- Guido Reni, Saint Sebastian
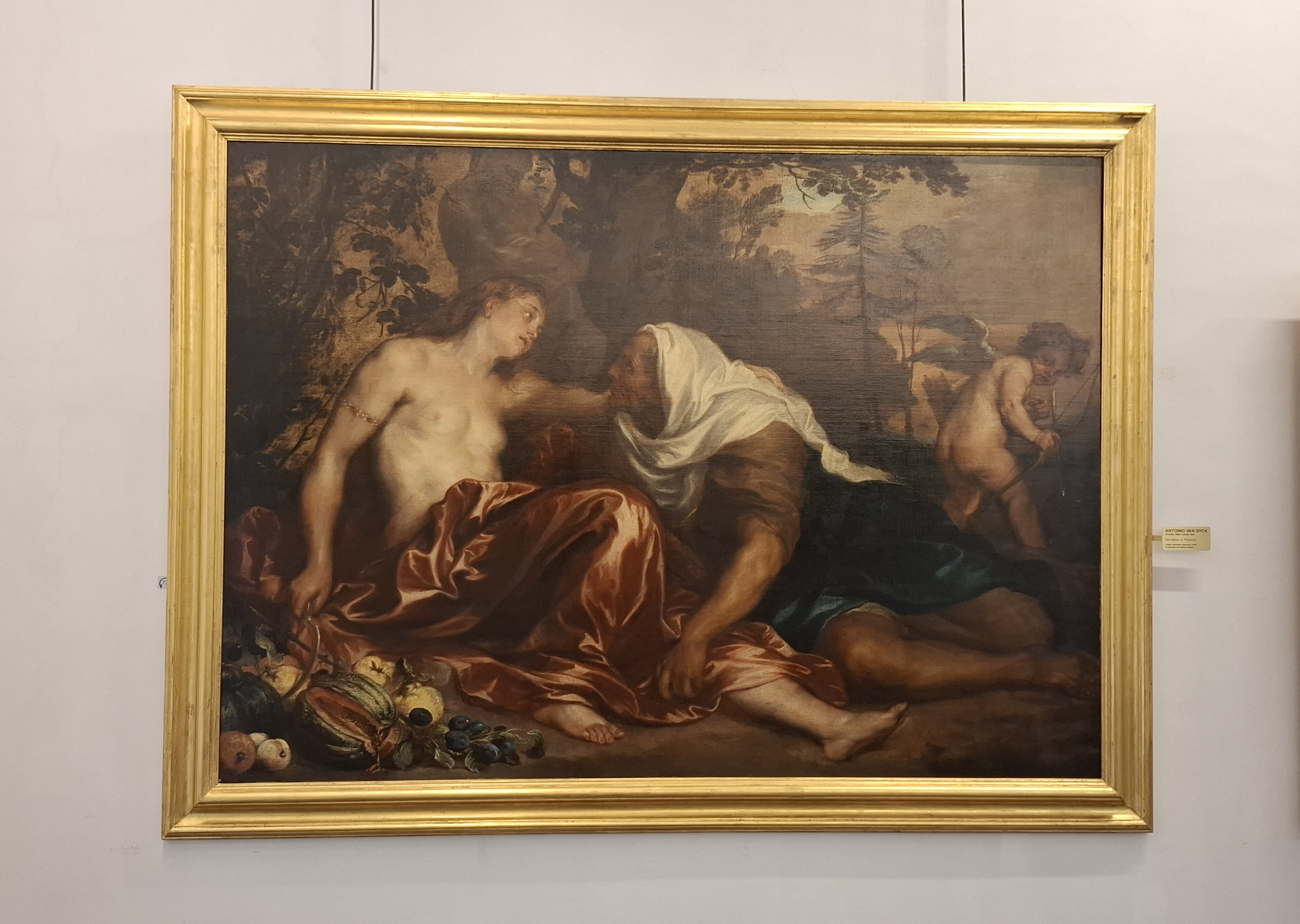
- Anthony van Dyck, Vetumnus and Pomona
- Anthony van Dyck, The tribute money
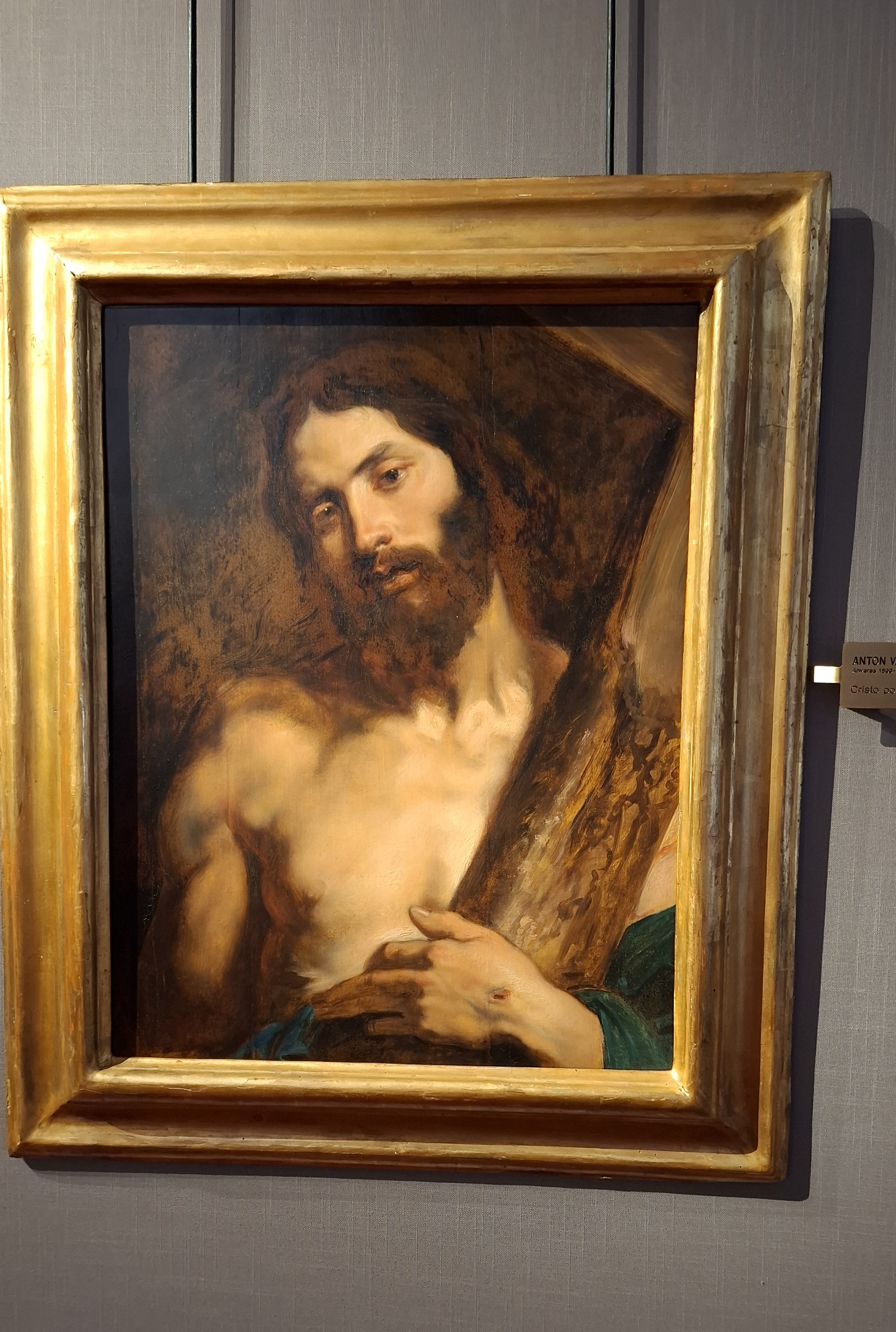
- Anthony van Dyck, Christ carrying the cross
- Anthony van Dyck, Portrait of Paolina Adorno Brignole Sale
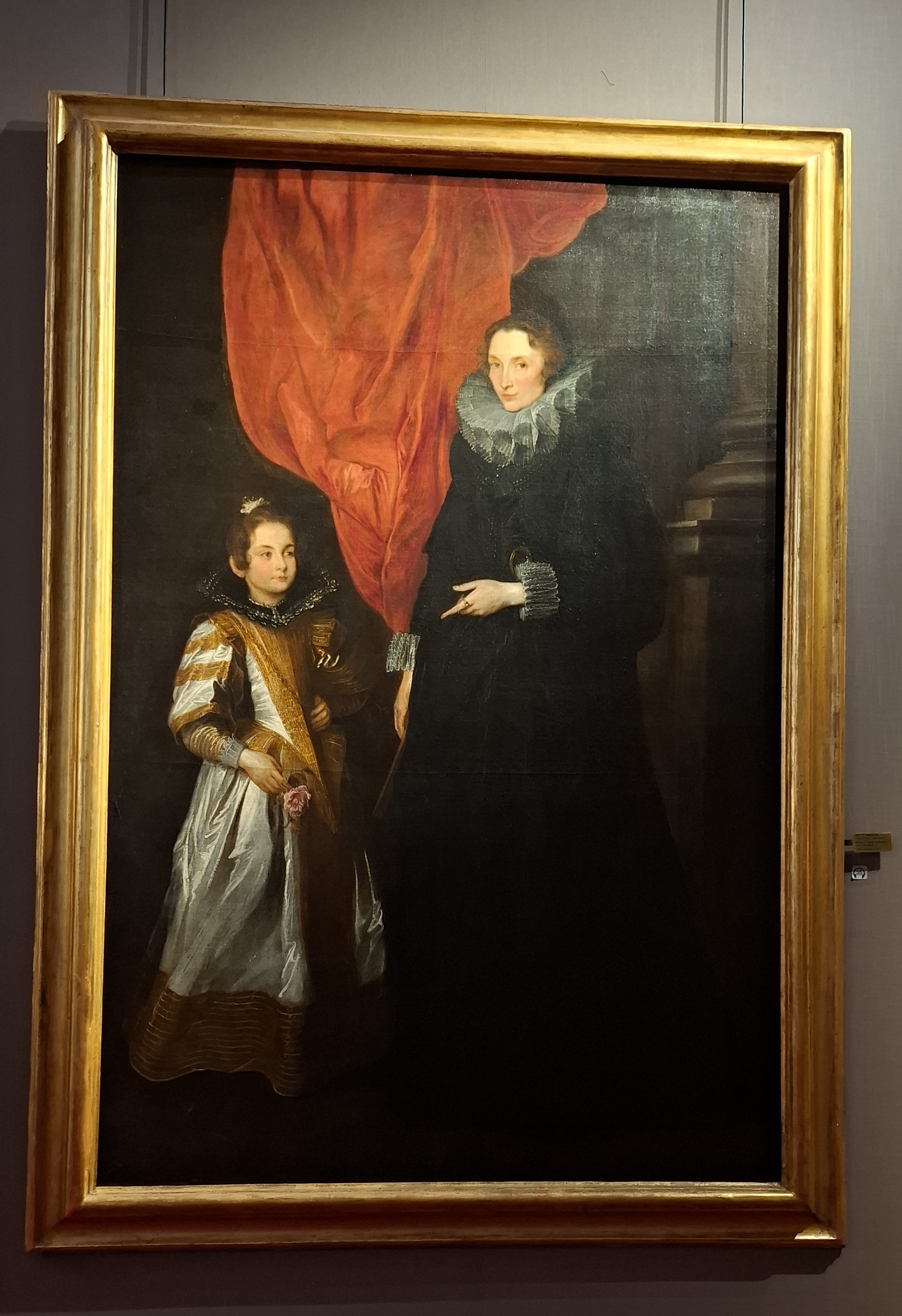
- Anthony van Dyck, Portrait of Geronima Sale Brignole with her daughter Maria
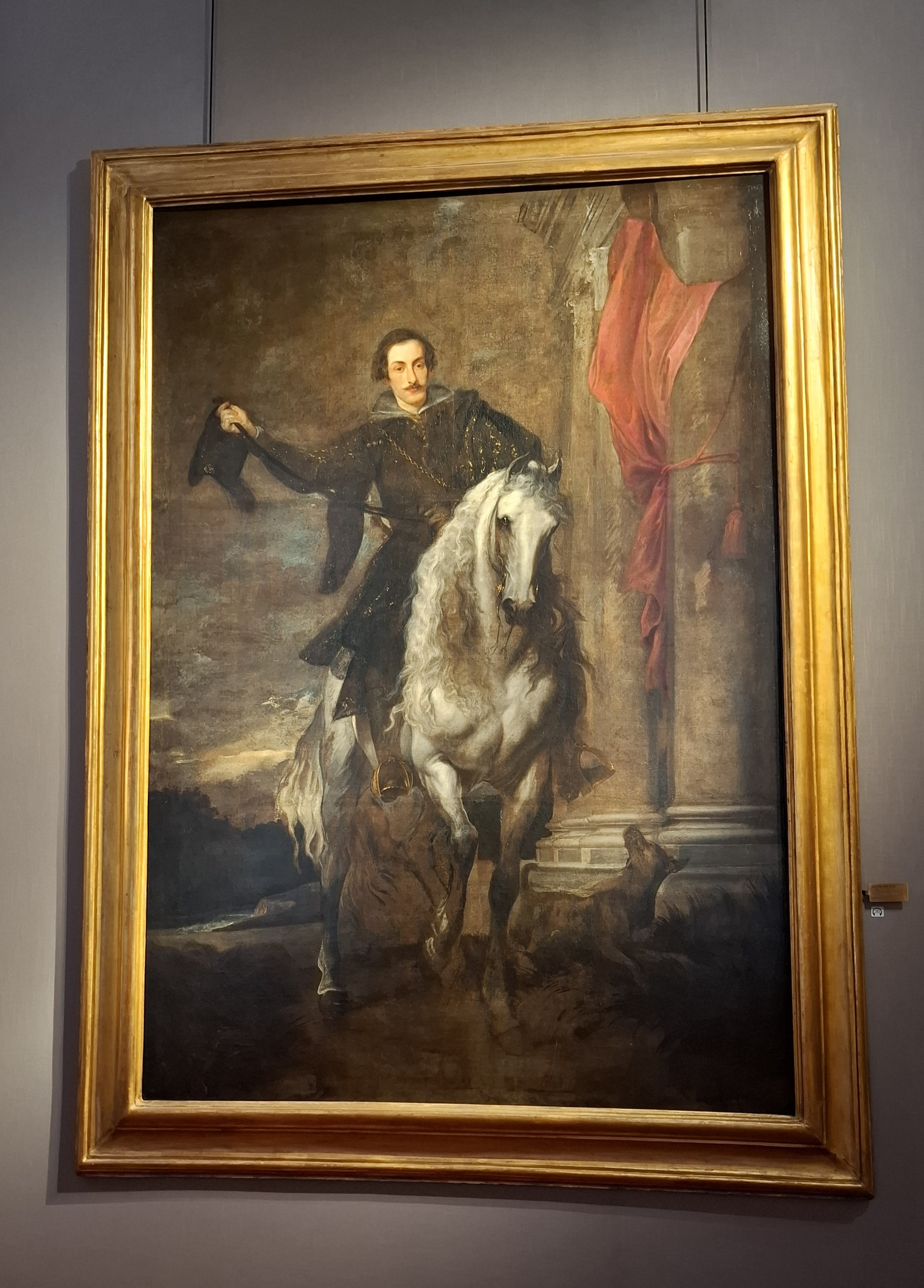
- Anthony van Dyck, Portrait of Anton Giulio Brignole Sale on horseback
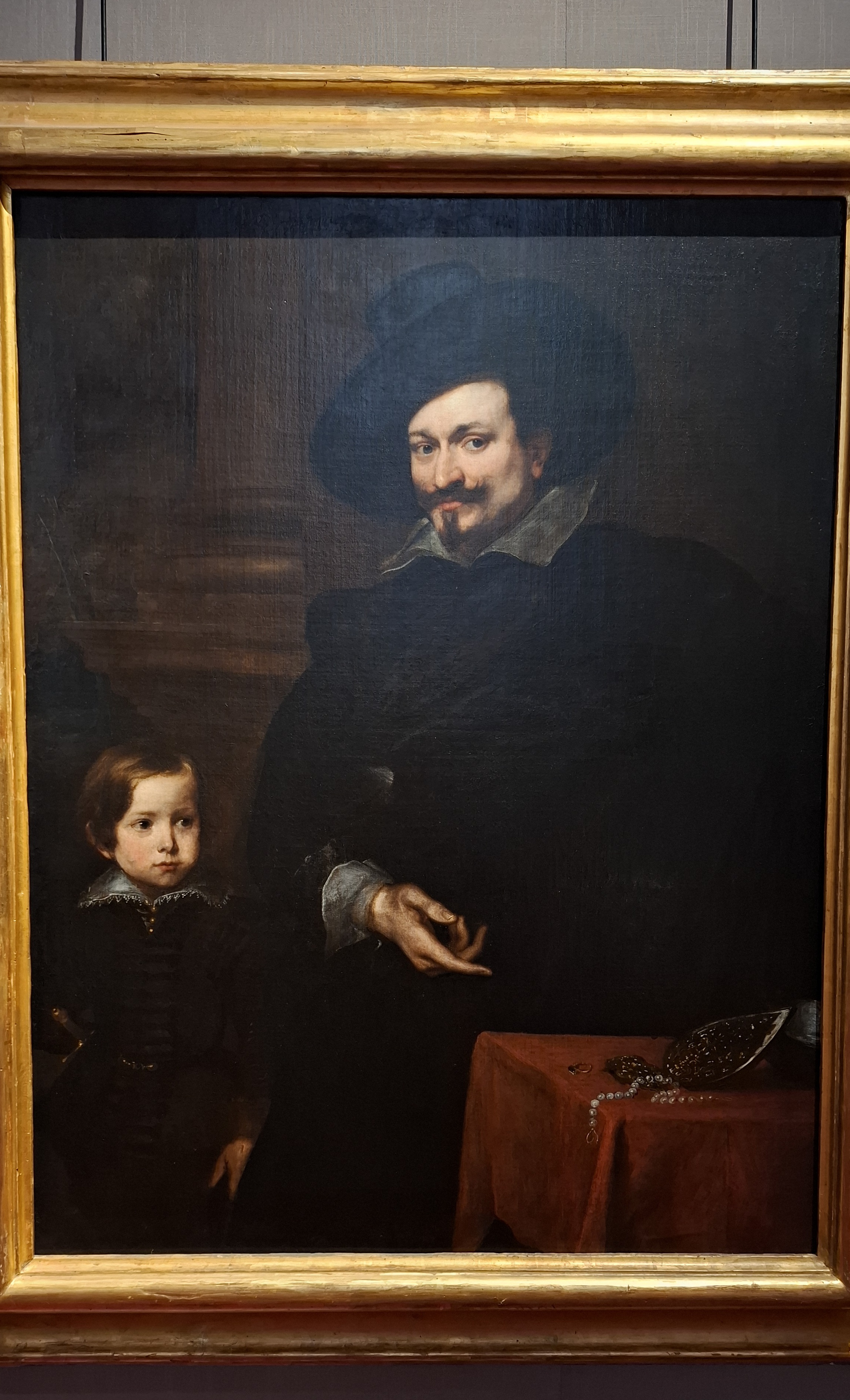
- Anthony van Dyck, Portrait of the jeweler Pucci and son
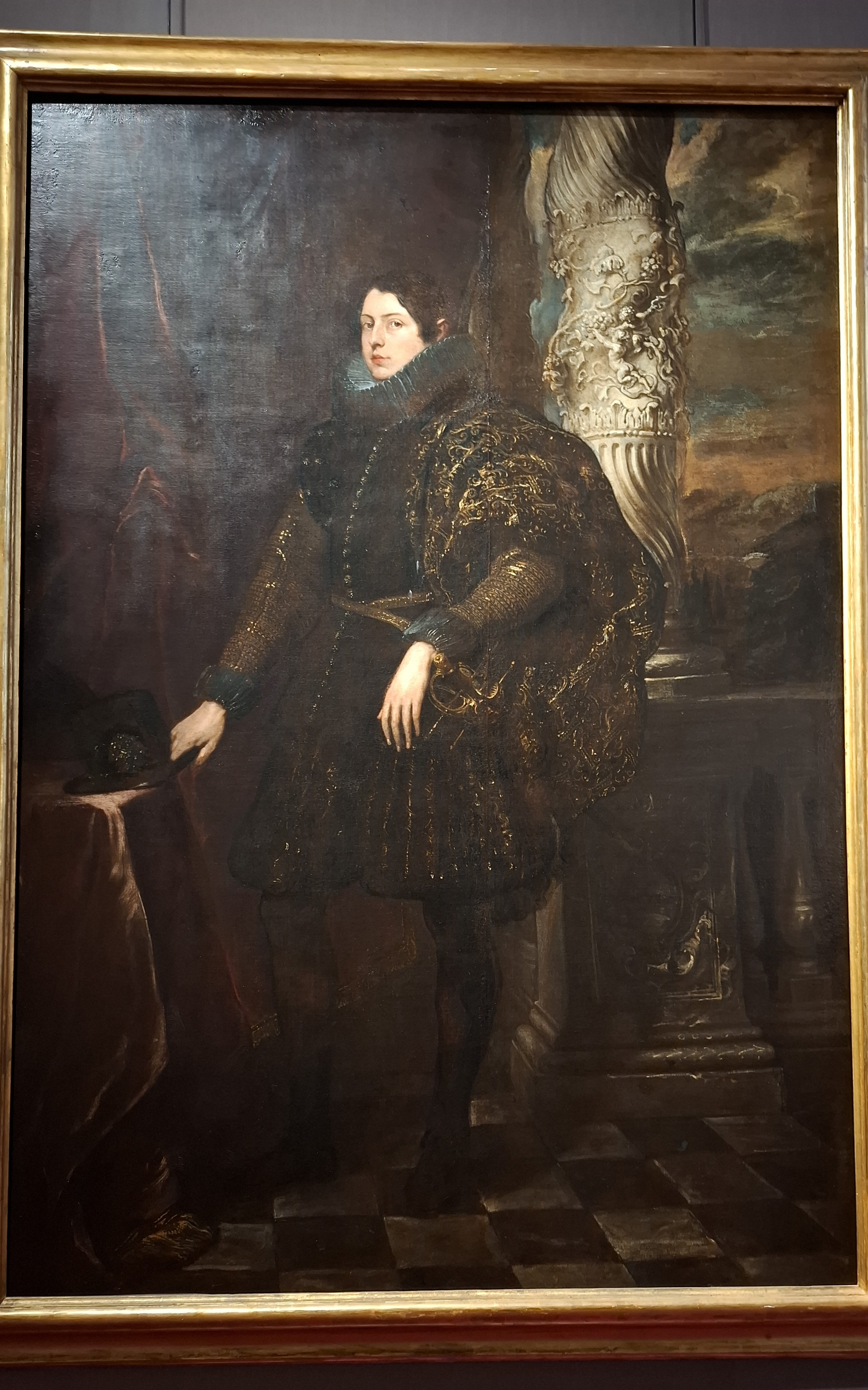
- Anthony van Dyck, Portrait of a gentleman of the Spinola family
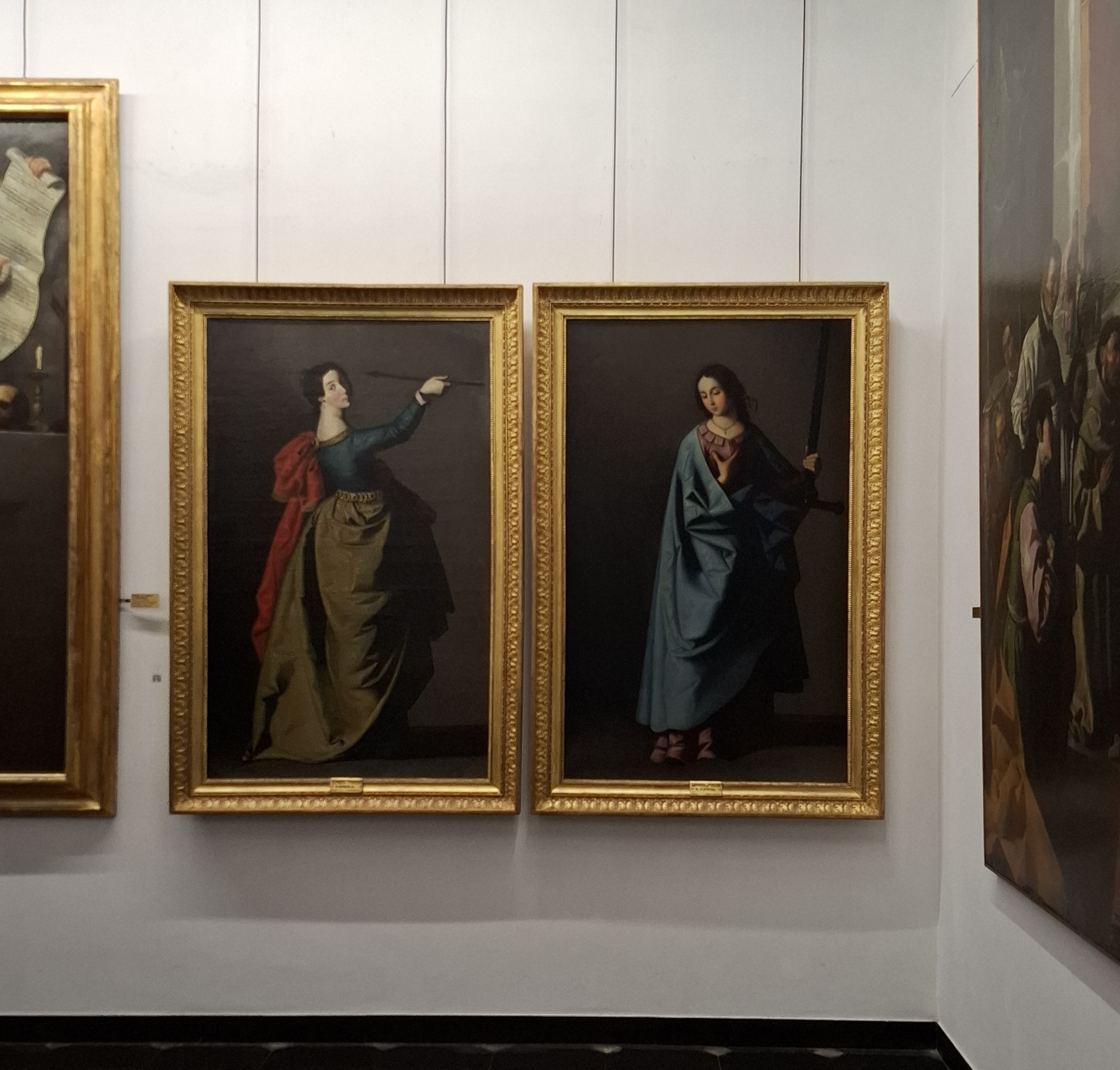
- Francisco de Zurbaran, Saint Ursula, Saint Euphemia
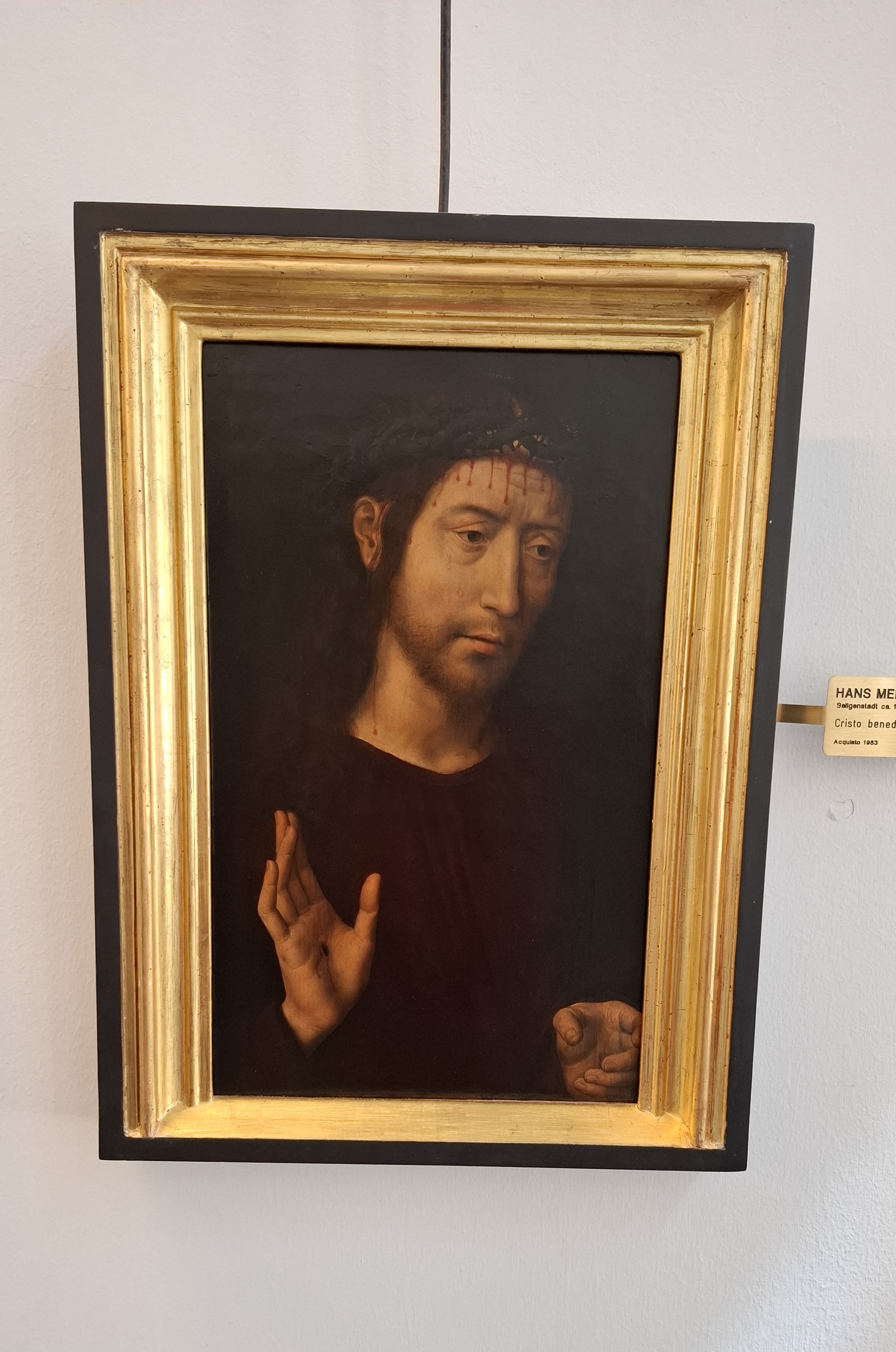
- Hans Memling, Blessing Christ
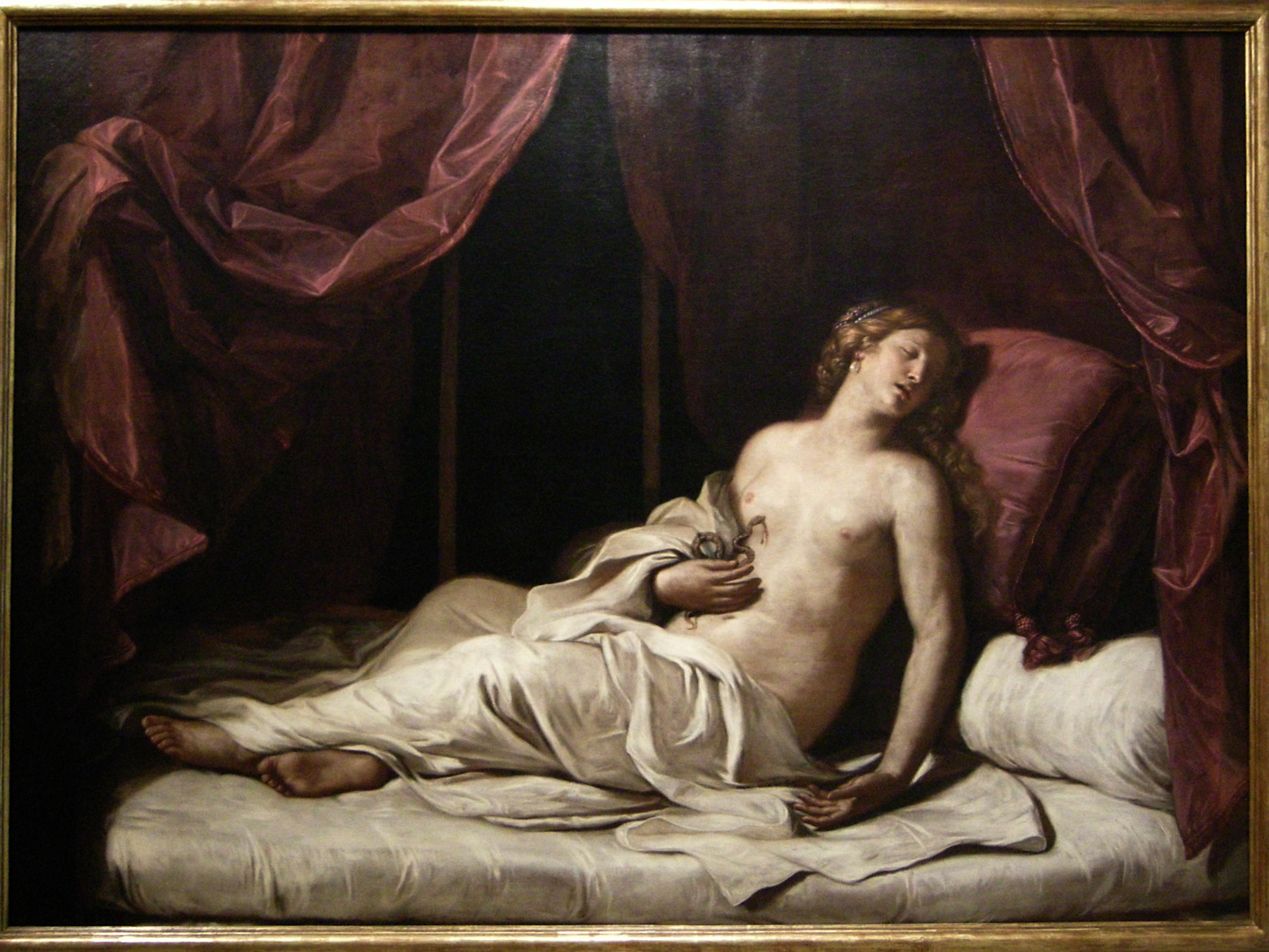
- Guercino, Dying Cleopatra
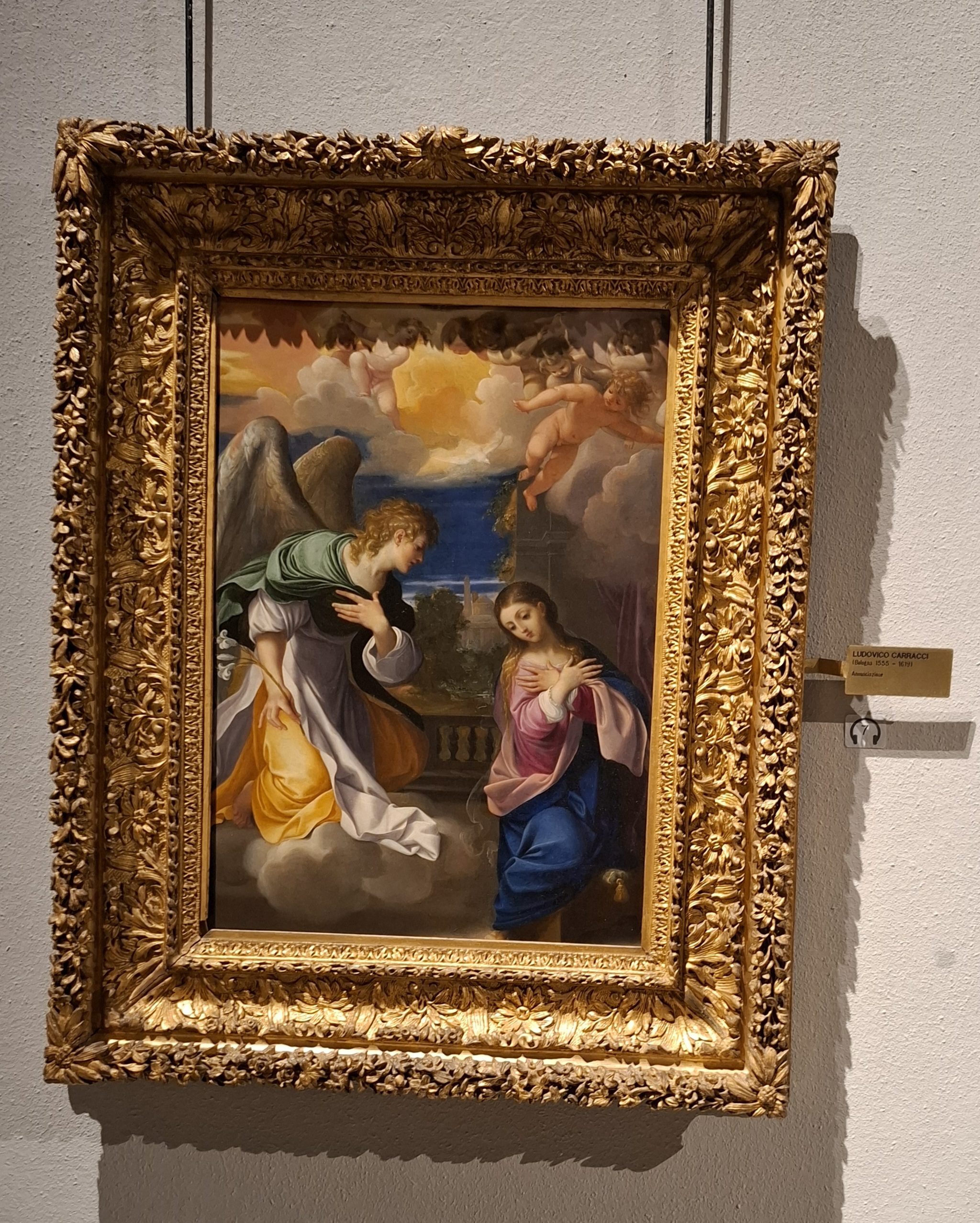
- Ludovico Carracci, Annunciation
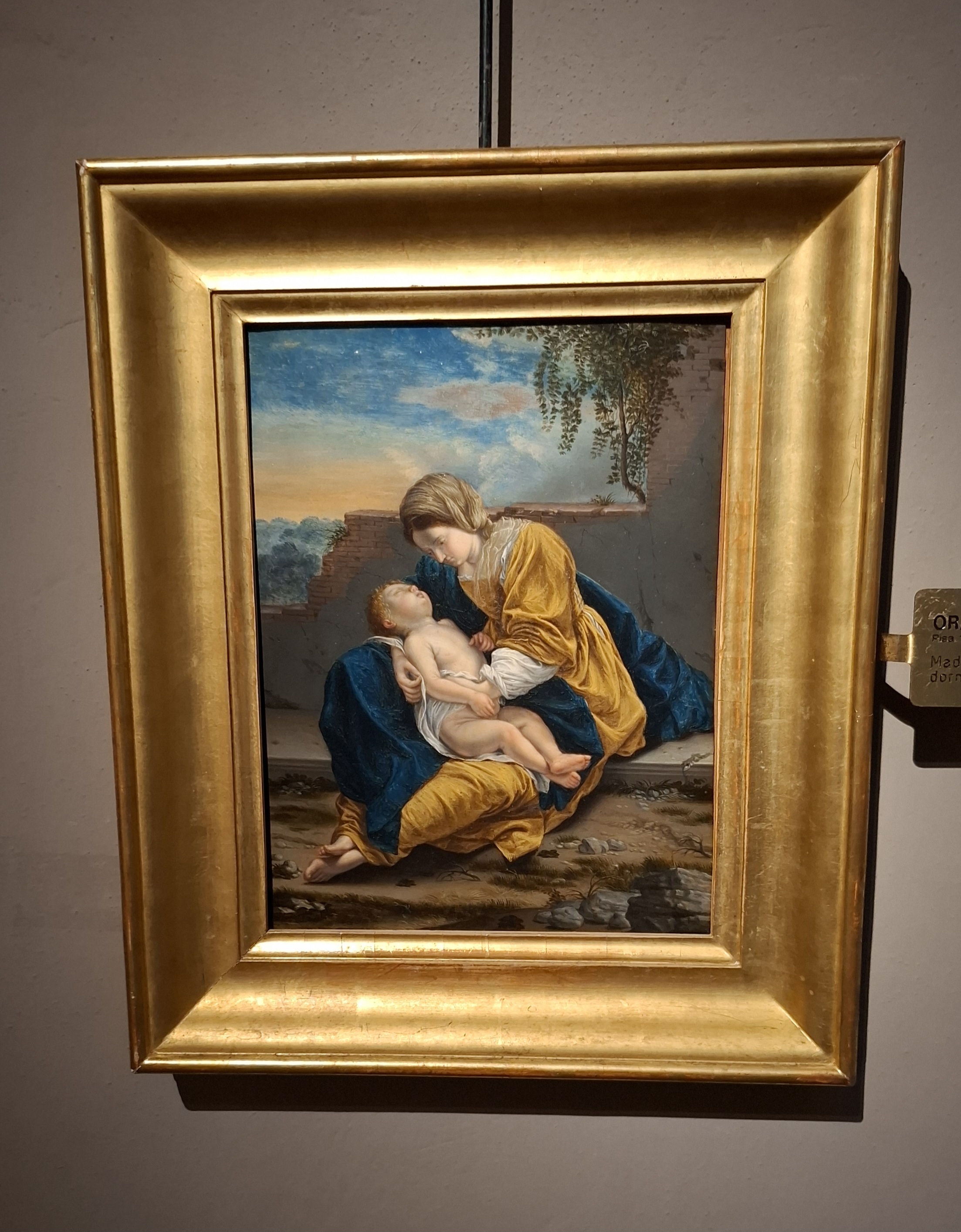
- Orazio Gentileschi, Virgin and sleeping child
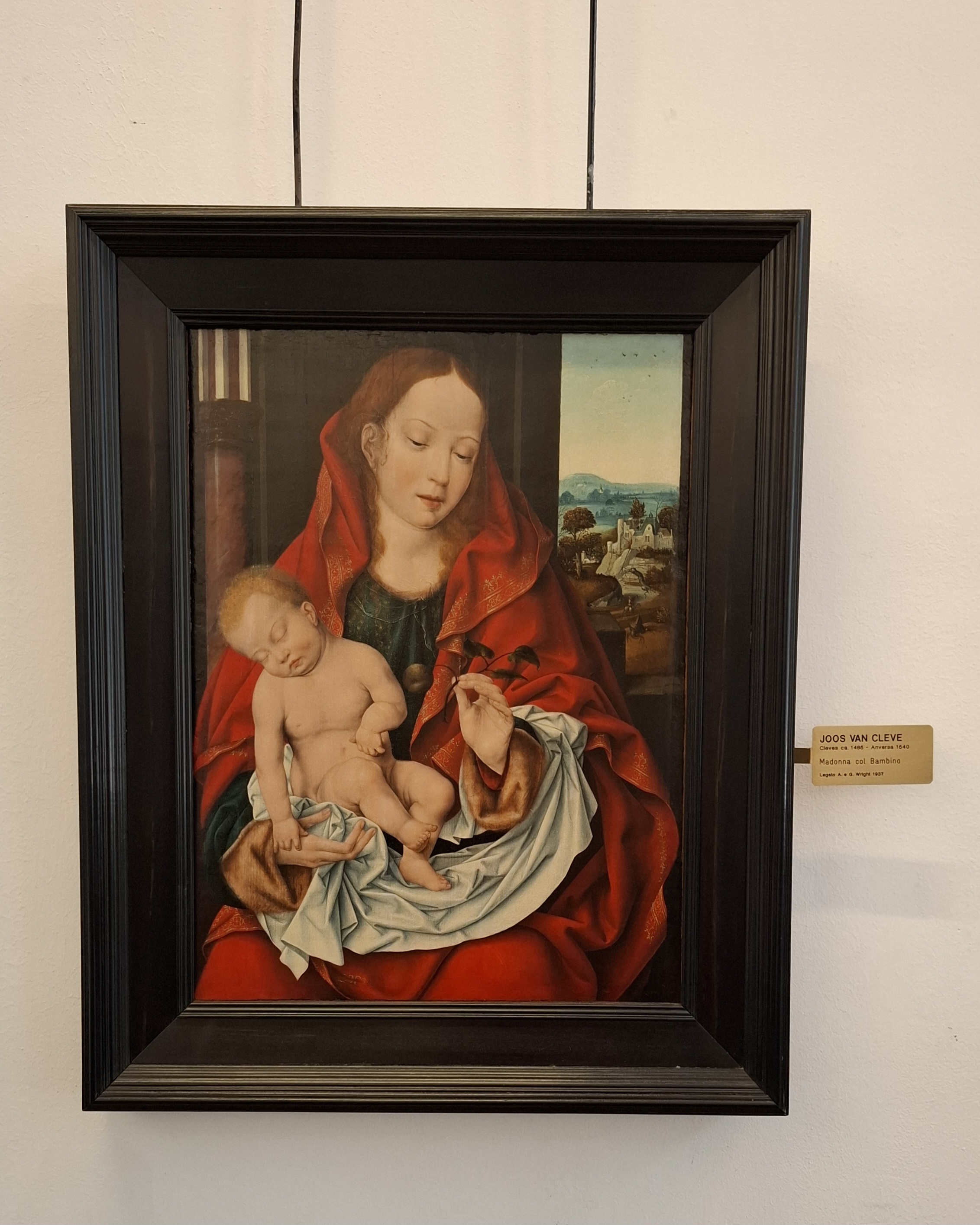
- Joos van Cleve, Virgin and child
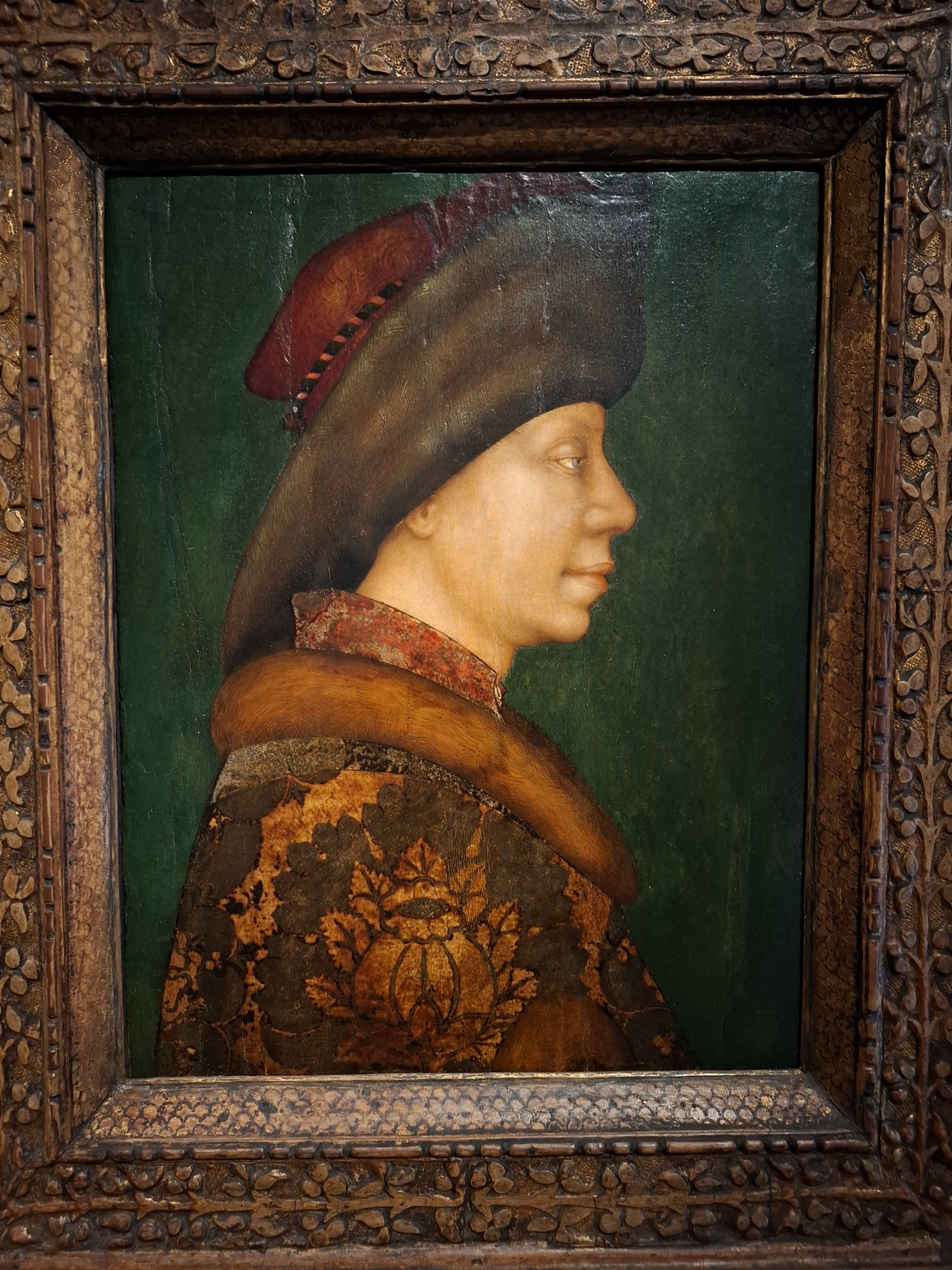
- Michele Giambono or Pisanello, Portrait of a Muscovite Prince
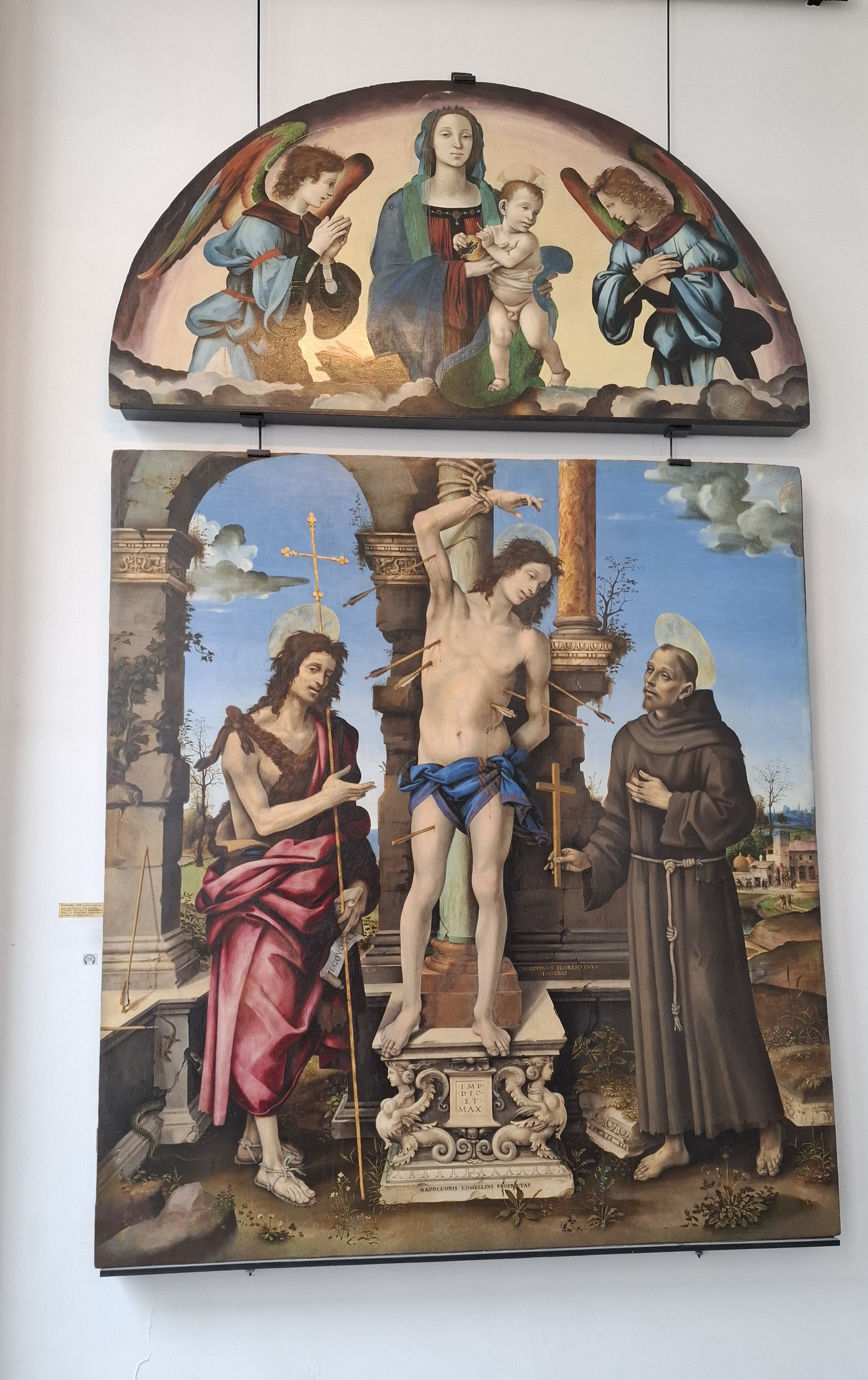
- Filippino Lippi, The Lomellini altarpiece
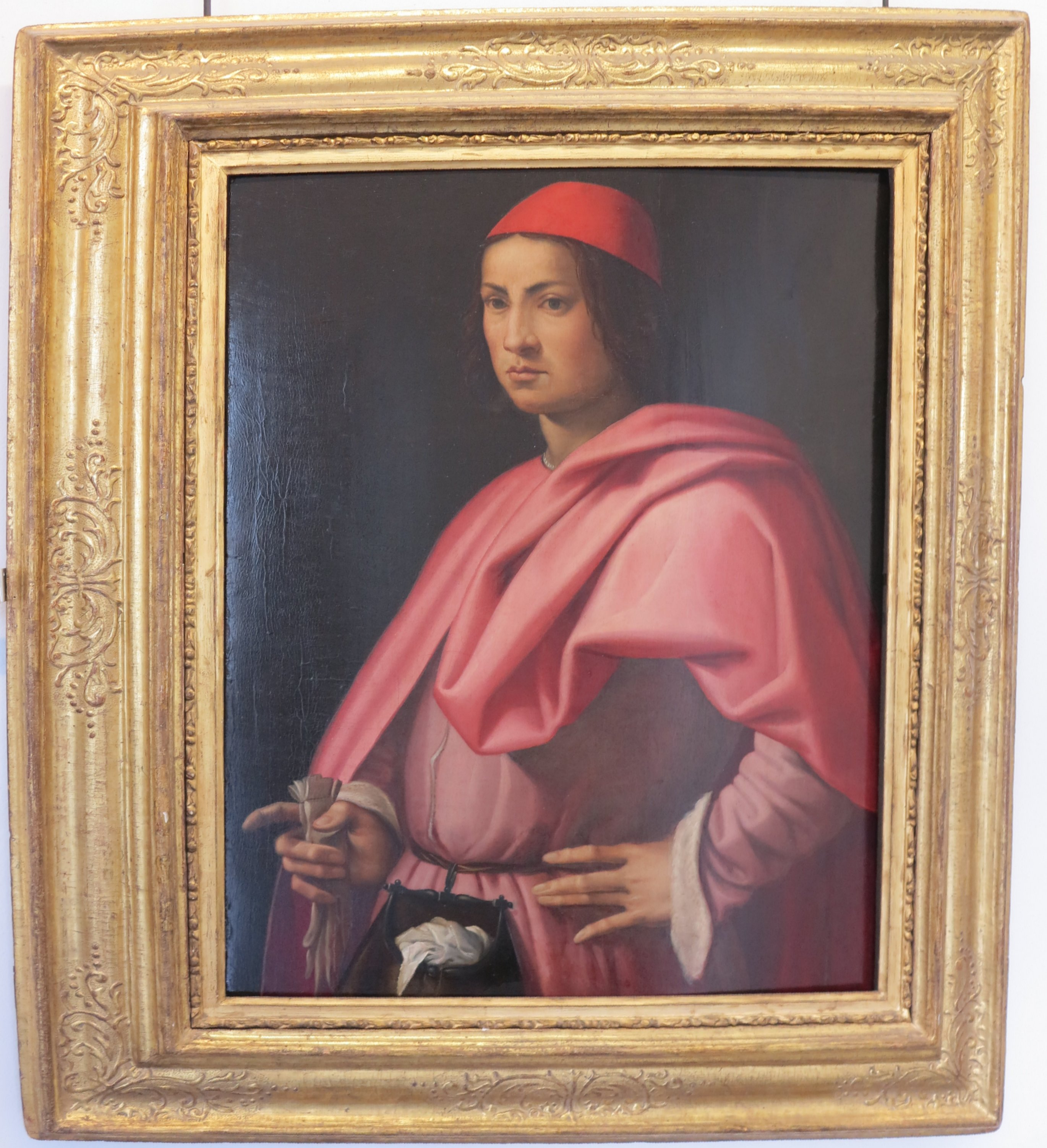
- Giorgio Vasari, Portrait of a Florentine gentleman
