= List of paintings by Bernardo Strozzi =

Paintings by the Baroque artist Bernardo Strozzi may be found in the Palazzo Rosso in Genoa, several churches and museums in Venice, the Hermitage Museum in St Petersburg, the Musée des beaux-arts in Chambéry, the Alte Pinakothek in Munich, the Kunsthistorisches Museum in Vienna, the Museum of Fine Arts in Budapest, the National Gallery in London and the Museo del Prado in Madrid.

== Australia ==
- The release of St Peter (c. 1635), oil on canvas, Art Gallery of New South Wales, Sydney

== Austria ==
- Elijah and the Widow of Zarephath (c. 1630), oil on canvas, Kunsthistorisches Museum, Vienna

== France ==
- Saint Anthony of Padua holding the Infant Jesus (c. 1625), oil on canvas, Musée des Beaux-Arts, Strasbourg

== Italy ==
=== Genoa ===
- Lament over the Dead Christ (1615–1617), St John the Baptist (1625) and St Augustine Washing Christ's Feet (1629), all oil on canvas – Accademia ligustica di belle arti
- Madonna and Child with the Infant John the Baptist (c. 1620) and Woman Cooking (c. 1625), both oil on canvas – Palazzo Rosso
- Curtius Rufus Throwing Himself into the Chasm and Horatius Cocles Defending the Sublician Bridge against the Etruscans, frescoes, Villa Centurione Carpaneto, Genova – San Pier d'Arena

=== Other ===
- St Lawrence Giving Alms (1615–1620), oil on canvas, Galleria nazionale d'arte antica di Palazzo Barberini, Rome
- The Miracle of Saint Diego d'Alcalà (1625), oil on canvas, Santissima Annunziata church, Levanto
- Portrait of a Knight of Malta (c. 1629), oil on canvas, Pinacoteca di Brera, Milan
- Blessed Salvatore da Horta Blessing the Sick (c. 1630), oil on canvas, Civic Collection, Novi Ligure
- St Francis, parish church, Campagnola Cremasca
- Madonna and Child with Saints Peter, Bartholomew, Simon and Anthony Abbot and the Donors, oil on canvas, Santi Pietro e Paolo church, Tiarno di Sopra, Ledro

== Poland ==
- The Abduction of Europa (early 1640s), oil on canvas, National Museum, Poznań. One of Strozzi's largest paintings (225 cm × 342 cm)

== Russia ==
- Old Woman at a Mirror (c. 1615), oil on canvas – Pushkin Museum, Moscow
- Allegory of the Arts, St John the Baptist, David and the Head of Goliath, Saint Secundus and the Angel and Tobias Heals his Blind Father, all oil on canvas – Hermitage Museum, St Petersburg

== Spain ==
- Veronica and Tobias Curing his Blind Father – Museo del Prado
- Saint Cecilia – Museo Thyssen-Bornemisza

== United States ==
- Adoration of the Shepherds (1615–1618), oil on canvas, Walters Art Museum, Baltimore
- St Cecilia, (1620–1625), oil on canvas, Nelson-Atkins Museum of Art, Kansas City
- Act of Mercy: Giving Drink to the Thirsty, (1620), oil on canvas, John and Mable Ringling Museum of Art, Sarasota
