= Penitent Magdalene (Canova) =

Sculpture by Antonio Canova

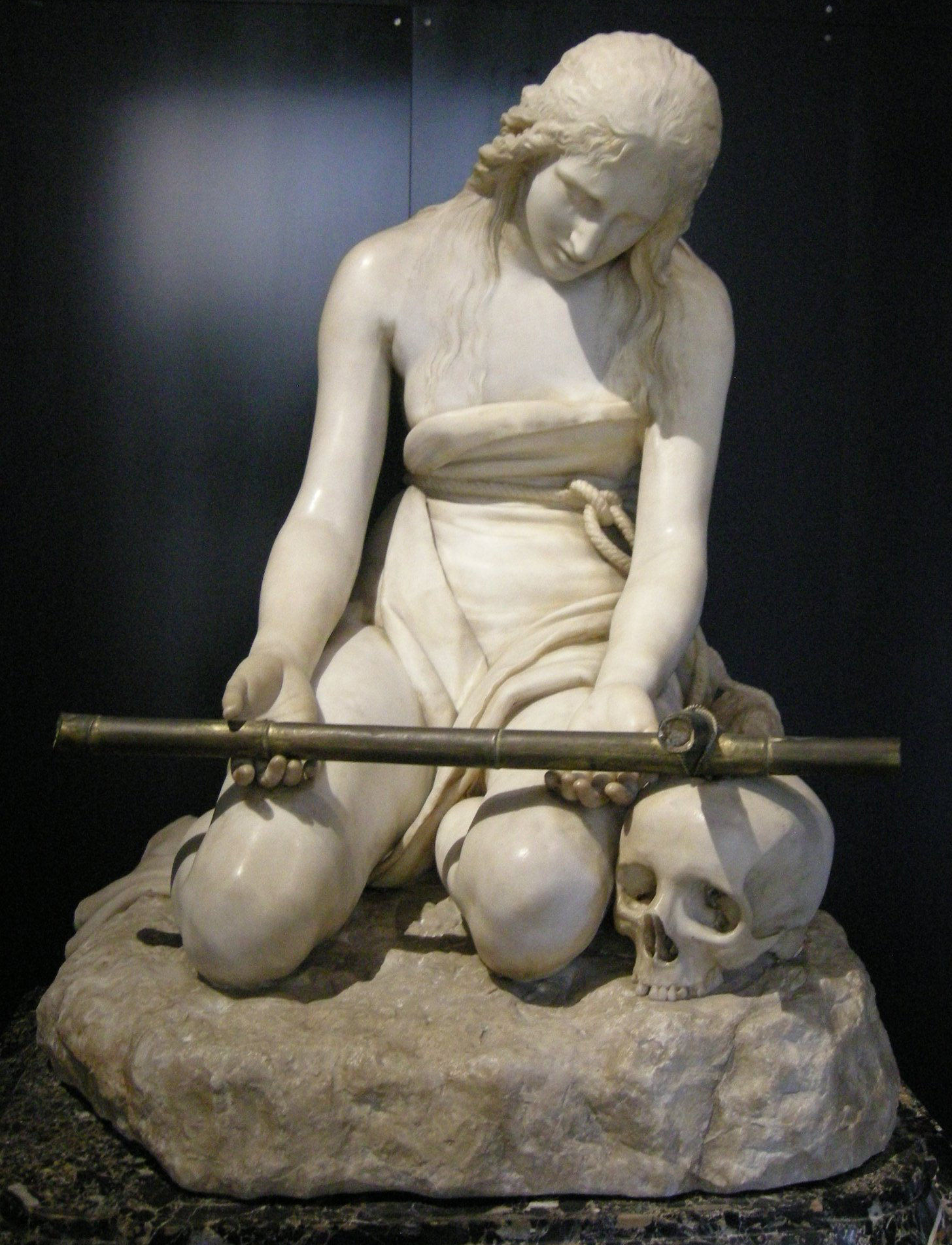
Genoa version

The Penitent Magdalene is a marble sculpture of Mary Magdalene by Antonio Canova, about 90 cm high, known in two final versions, now in Genoa and St Petersburg.

== Genoa ==
The difficulties in elaborating the theme had led Canova to produce two very different preparatory works. The original version of 1793–1796 was praised at the Salon of 1808, the first of Canova's works to be a success there. It was acquired by the French commissar Juliot and in 1808 passed into the hands of the Milanese collector Comte Masseo conte Giovanni Battista Sommariva and, after his death, to signor d'Aguado. It was acquired by Raffaele de Ferrari, Duca di Galliera and displayed in his palace in Paris, before being left to the collection of the city of Genoa in 1889 by his wife Maria Brignole-Sale de Ferrari - it is now in the Palazzo Doria-Tursi, part of the Strada Nuova Museums in Genoa.

== St Petersburg ==
Canova also produced another version between 1808 and 1809 for Eugène de Beauharnais, viceroy of Italy, who exhibited it in his palace in Munich. The initial preparatory work showed the head raised and the arms crossed, but in the final 1808–1809 work the head are lowered and the hands holding a gilded bronze cross, though that is missing in the 1808–1809 version, either subsequently lost or more likely since mixed-medium sculptures were not accepted in France at that time.

This version remained in the collection of the de Beauharnais' successors as Duke of Leuchtenberg and thus moved to St Petersburg, passing to Soviet Russia's State Museum Fund and finally in 1922 to the Hermitage Museum, where it remains.
