= Susannah and the Elders (Veronese) =

Painting by Paolo Veronese

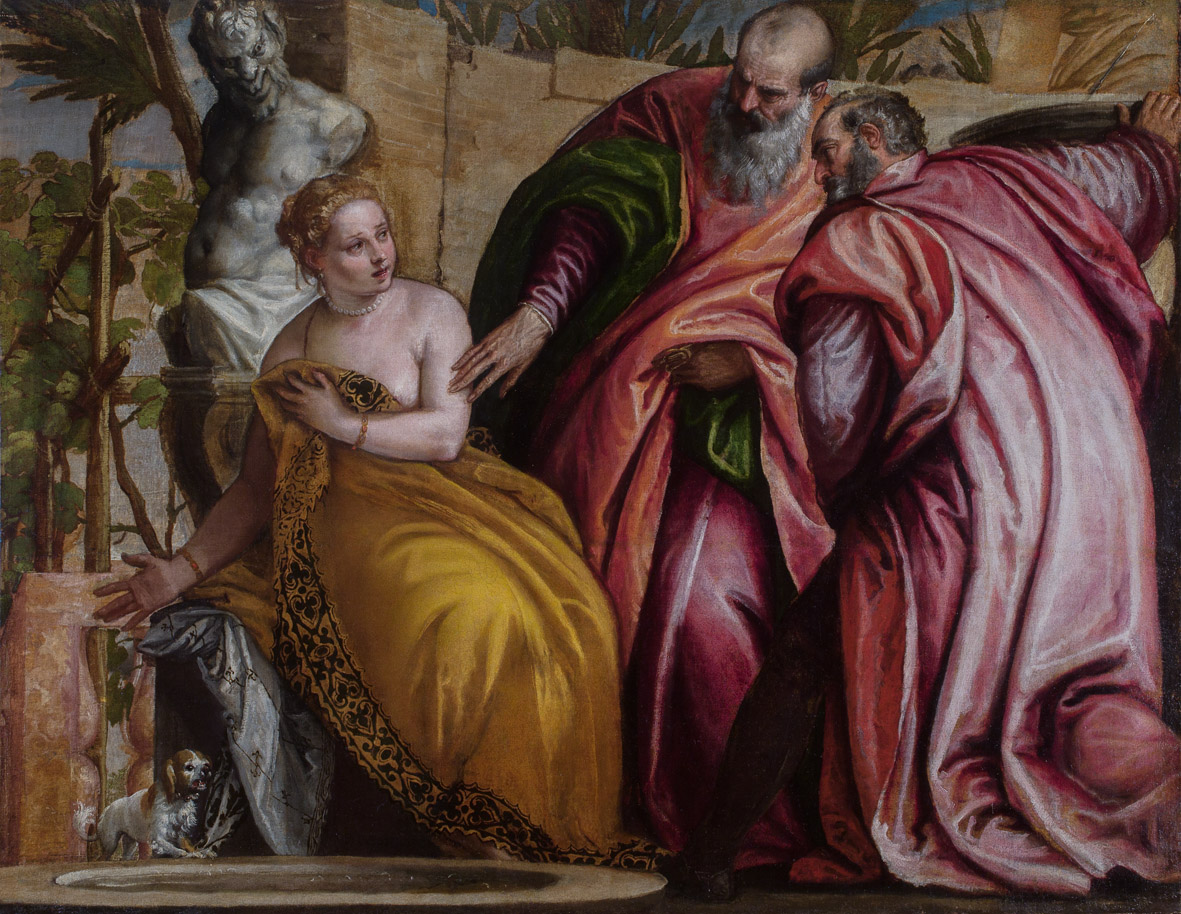
- Artist: Paolo Veronese
- Year: c. 1580
- Medium: Oil on canvas
- Dimensions: 111 cm × 245 cm (44 in × 96 in)
- Location: Palazzo Bianco; Genoa

Susannah and the Elders (Italian: Susanna e i vecchioni) is a circa 1580 oil-on-canvas painting depicting Susannah and the Elders by Paolo Veronese. It is now on permanent display at the Palazzo Bianco in Genoa. It is first recorded as being in Genoa in the 18th century. Previous owners include Gaspar Méndez de Haro, 7th Marquis of Carpio, a 17th-century Spanish collector.

A wall surrounds and encloses the scene. A small dog—a symbol of fidelity and incorruptibility—and a statue of a satyr that looks lewdly at Susannah are also depicted in the painting. Veronese used these three symbols of the wall, dog, and satyr in other paintings of the same biblical theme and around the same time period in similar works preserved at the Louvre in Paris.
