= David with the Head of Goliath =

David with the Head of Goliath may refer to many paintings, including:

- David with the Head of Goliath (Caravaggio, Rome)
- David with the Head of Goliath (Caravaggio, Vienna)
- David with the Head of Goliath (Castagno)
- David with the head of Goliath (Leyster)
- David with the Head of Goliath (Massimo Stanzione)
- David with the Head of Goliath (Pollaiuolo)
