= Saint Francis (Strozzi) =

Painting attributed to Bernardo Strozzi

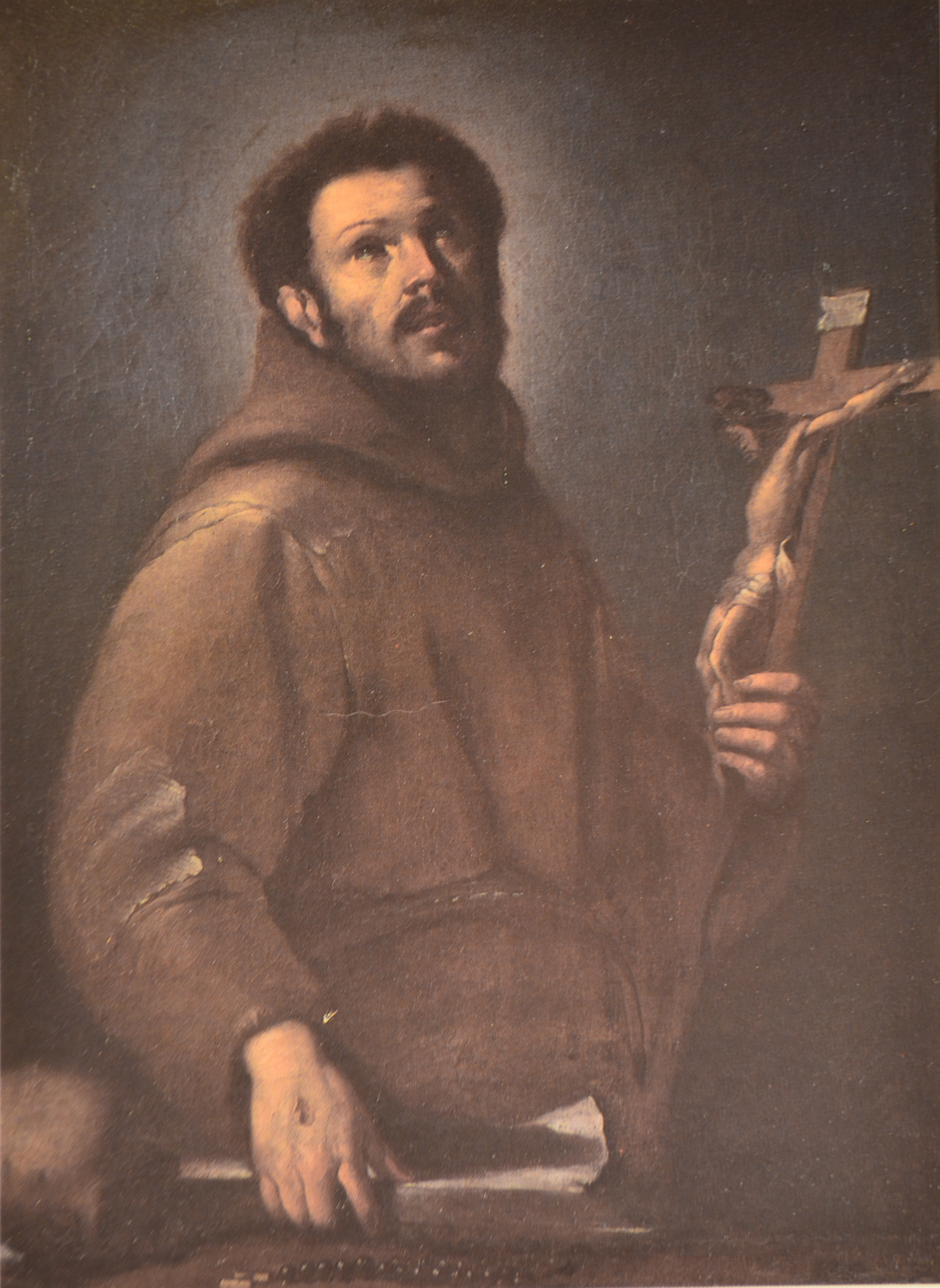
- Year: 17th century
- Dimensions: 99 cm (39 in) × 75 cm (30 in)

Saint Francis is an undated and unfinished oil painting on canvas attributed to Bernardo Strozzi in the parish church of Campagnola Cremasca, Lombardy, Italy.

It has similarities to other paintings of Francis of Assisi by Strozzi now held in Genoa (Palazzo Bianco, Palazzo Rosso and Rubinacci collection) and the Pinacoteca di Siena. Its attribution to Strozzi originated with Cesare Alpini, but the artist's uncertain chronology makes it impossible to date this work more precisely than his mature post-Mannerist period.
