= Woman Cooking =

Paintings by Bernardo Strozzi

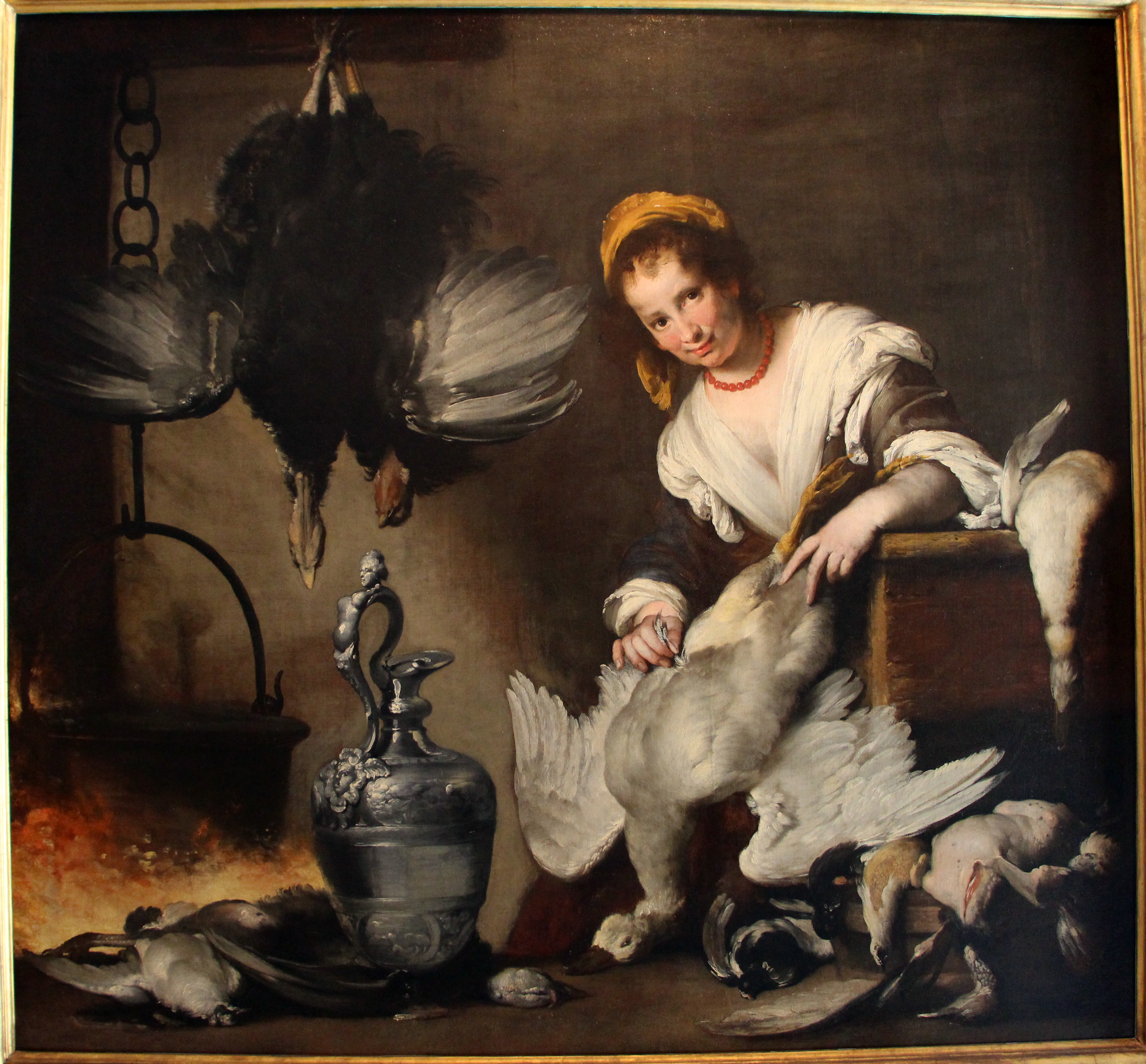
The Genoa version

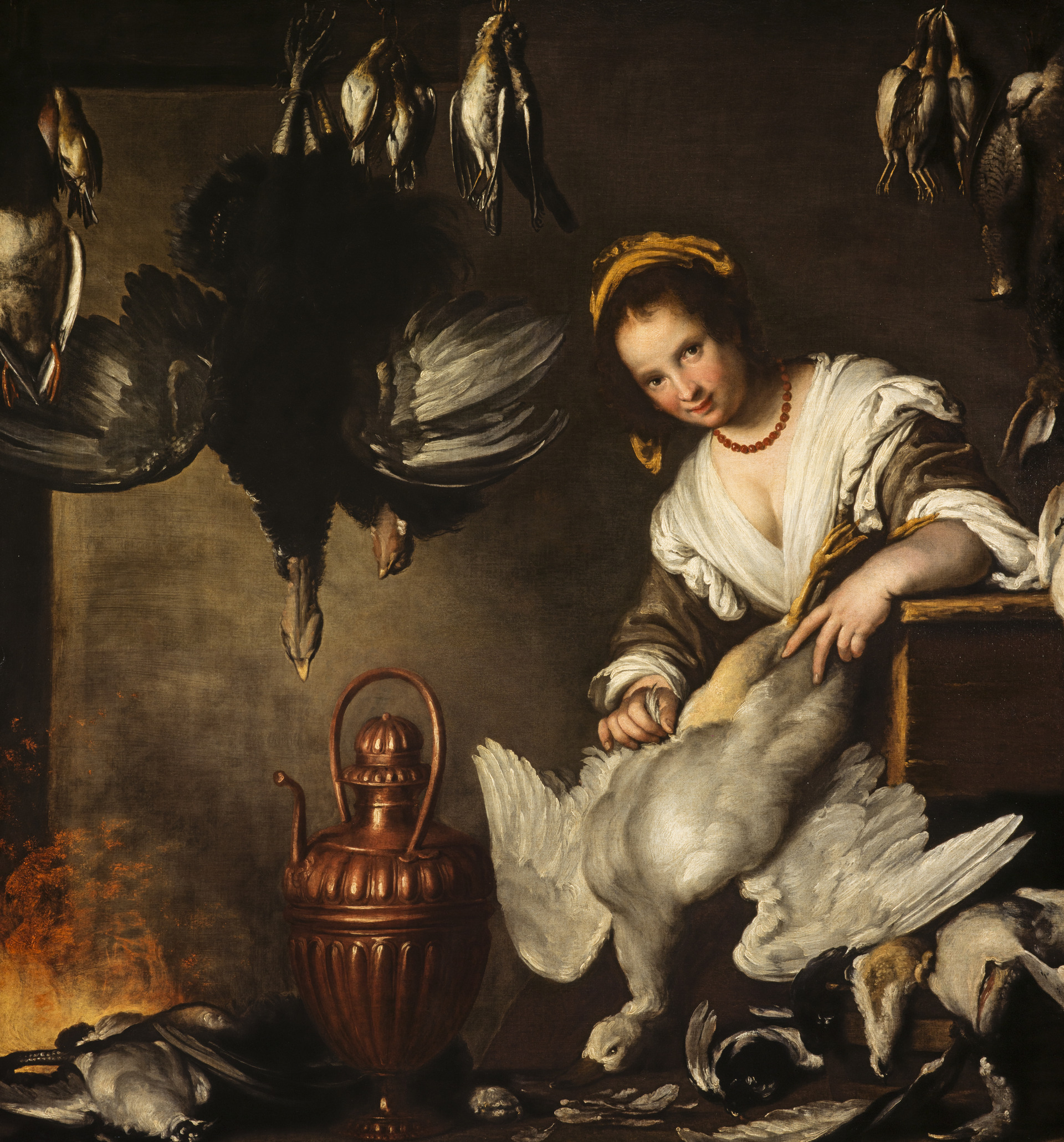
Edinburgh version

Woman Cooking or The Cook (Italian - La cuoca) is the modern title given to a circa 1625 oil on canvas genre painting by Bernardo Strozzi, produced in Genoa and still held in the Palazzo Rosso in the city, part of the Strada Nuova Museums. A second autograph version with various differences was in the painter's studio at his death and is now at the National Gallery of Scotland in Edinburgh.

The Genoa version first appears in the written record in a 1683 inventory of the goods of Gio. Francesco I Brignole-Sale del 1683, with the title "Animals and figure of a standing woman cooking by Prete Cappuccino". At the end of the 18th century, it was recorded as hanging in the Palazzo Rosso – that palace and all the artworks it contained were donated to the city of Genoa by Duchessa di Galliera Maria Brignole-Sale De Ferrari in 1874.

Despite the modern title the woman is in fact a general servant or maid rather than a cook – the precious silver plate shows the work to be set in a patrician palace kitchen, where at that date the cooks were always male. The subject derives from the Flemish kitchen-set works of Pieter Aertsen and Joachim Beuckelaer, already known in Genoa at that time. Its genre subject would have placed it low in the art hierarchy of De Ferrari's time, but it is now considered one of Strozzi's best works, with much in common with contemporary Italian Baroque art Some interpret it as an allegory of the five senses or the four elements, though this is not the majority view.
