= Anthony of Padua =

Portuguese Catholic saint (1195–1231)

Saint Anthony of Padua OFM
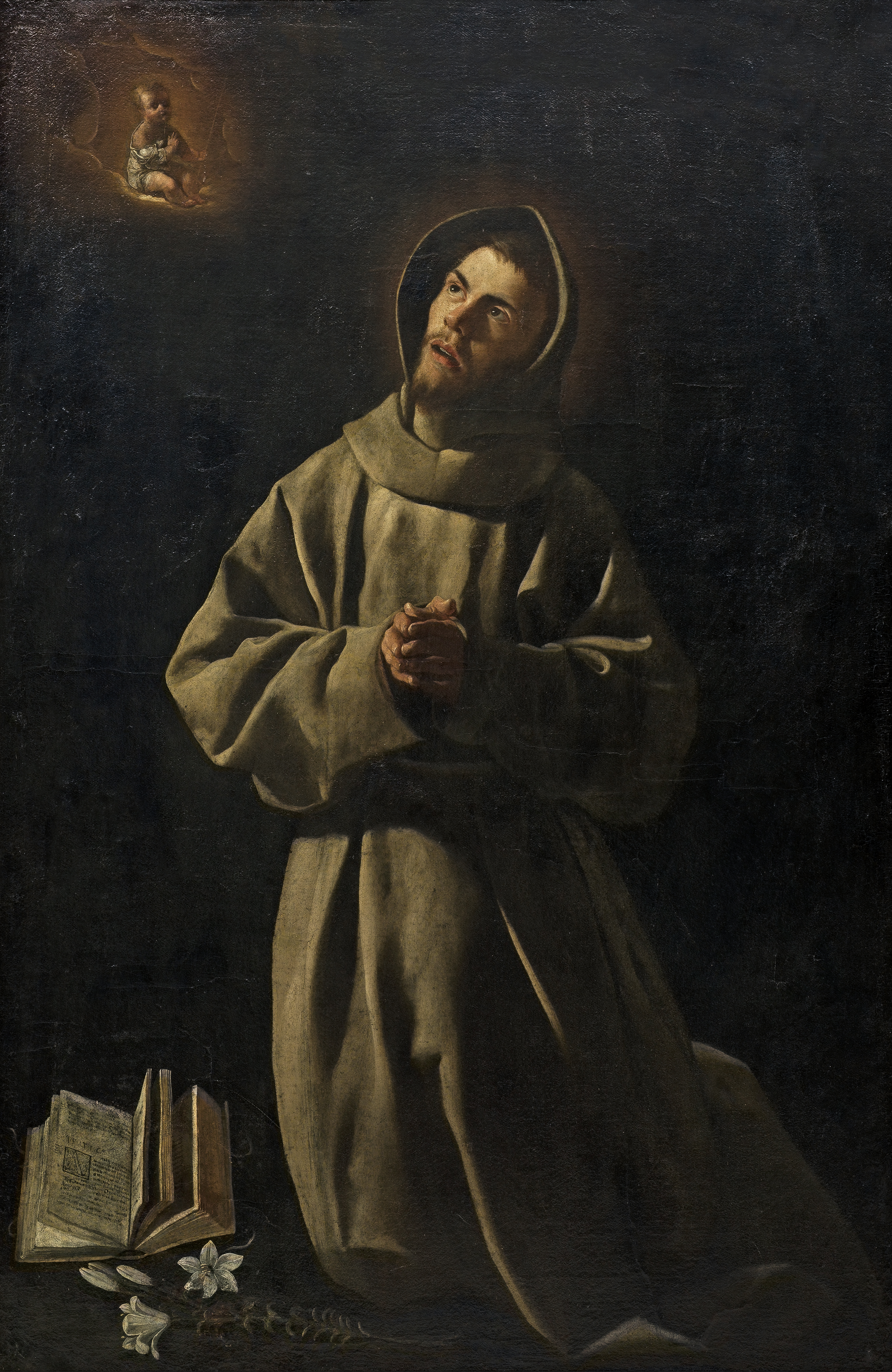
- Anthony of Padua by Francisco de Zurbarán, 1627–1630

Doctor of the Church
- Born: Fernando Martins de Bulhões; 15 August 1195; Lisbon, Kingdom of Portugal
- Died: 13 June 1231 (aged 35): Arcella, Kingdom of Italy, Holy Roman Empire; (now Padua, Italy)
- Venerated in: Catholic Church, Anglican Communion
- Canonized: 30 May 1232, Spoleto, Italy by Pope Gregory IX
- Major shrine: Basilica of Saint Anthony of Padua, Church of Saint Anthony of Lisbon
- Feast: 13 June
- Attributes: Religious habit of a Friar Minor, lily, book, tonsure, holding the Infant Jesus, mule
- Patronage: Custody of the Holy Land, miracles, travelers, finding one's spouse, pregnancy, harvests, animals, lost items, lost people, lost souls, limb-loss (amputees), poverty, sterility, the sick, the disabled, the oppressed, the hungry, the elderly, faith in the Blessed Sacrament, sailors, fishermen, watermen, swineherds, mail carriers, counter-revolutionaries, indigenous peoples of the Americas, Tigua, Padua, Lisbon, Portugal, Brazil, Albania, Anzio, Pila, Laguna, Iriga, Camarines Sur, Camaligan, Camarines Sur, Gubat, Sorsogon, Tuburan, Cebu, Barotac Nuevo, Iloilo, Cusco, Peru, Kandy, Sri Lanka

Anthony of Padua or Anthony of Lisbon (born Fernando Martins de Bulhões; 15 August 1195 – 13 June 1231) was a Portuguese Catholic priest and member of the Order of Friars Minor.

== Life ==
=== Early years ===
Church of Saint Anthony, in Lisbon, Portugal, built over the original house where the Portuguese saint was born

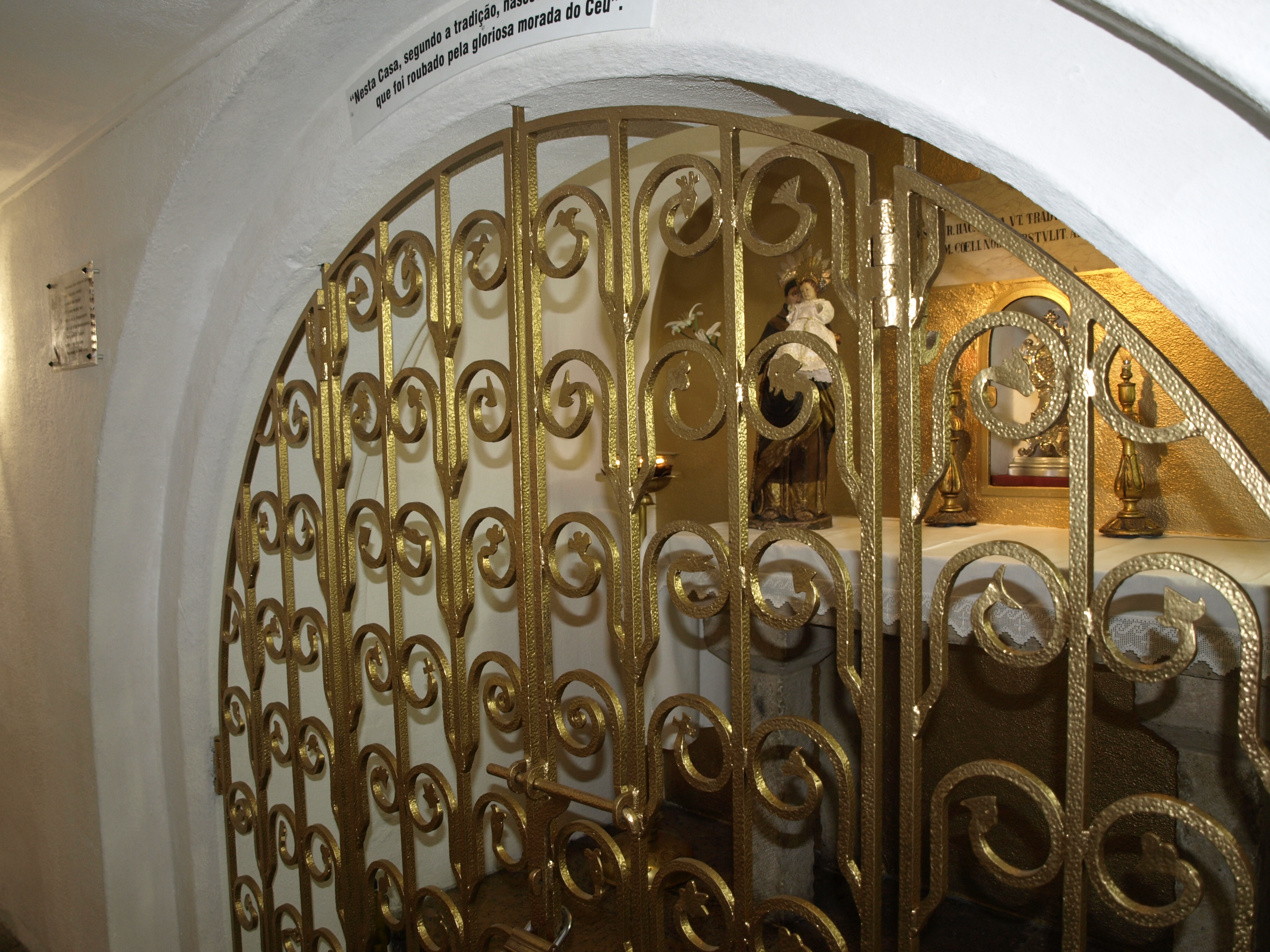
Birthplace of St. Anthony, in Lisbon, Portugal, located in the crypt of the church dedicated to him

Anthony was born Fernando Martins de Bulhões in Lisbon, Portugal. While 15th-century writers state that his parents were Vicente Martins and Teresa Pais Taveira, and that his father was the brother of Pedro Martins de Bulhões, the ancestor of the Bulhão or Bulhões family, Niccolò Dal-Gal views this as less certain. His wealthy and noble family arranged for him to be instructed at the local cathedral school. At the age of 15, he was received into the Canons Regular of the Order of the Holy Cross at the Abbey of Saint Vincent on the outskirts of Lisbon.

In 1212, distracted by frequent visits from family and friends, he asked to be transferred to the motherhouse of the congregation, the Monastery of the Holy Cross in Coimbra, then the capital of Portugal. There, the young Fernando studied theology and Latin.

=== Joining the Franciscans ===
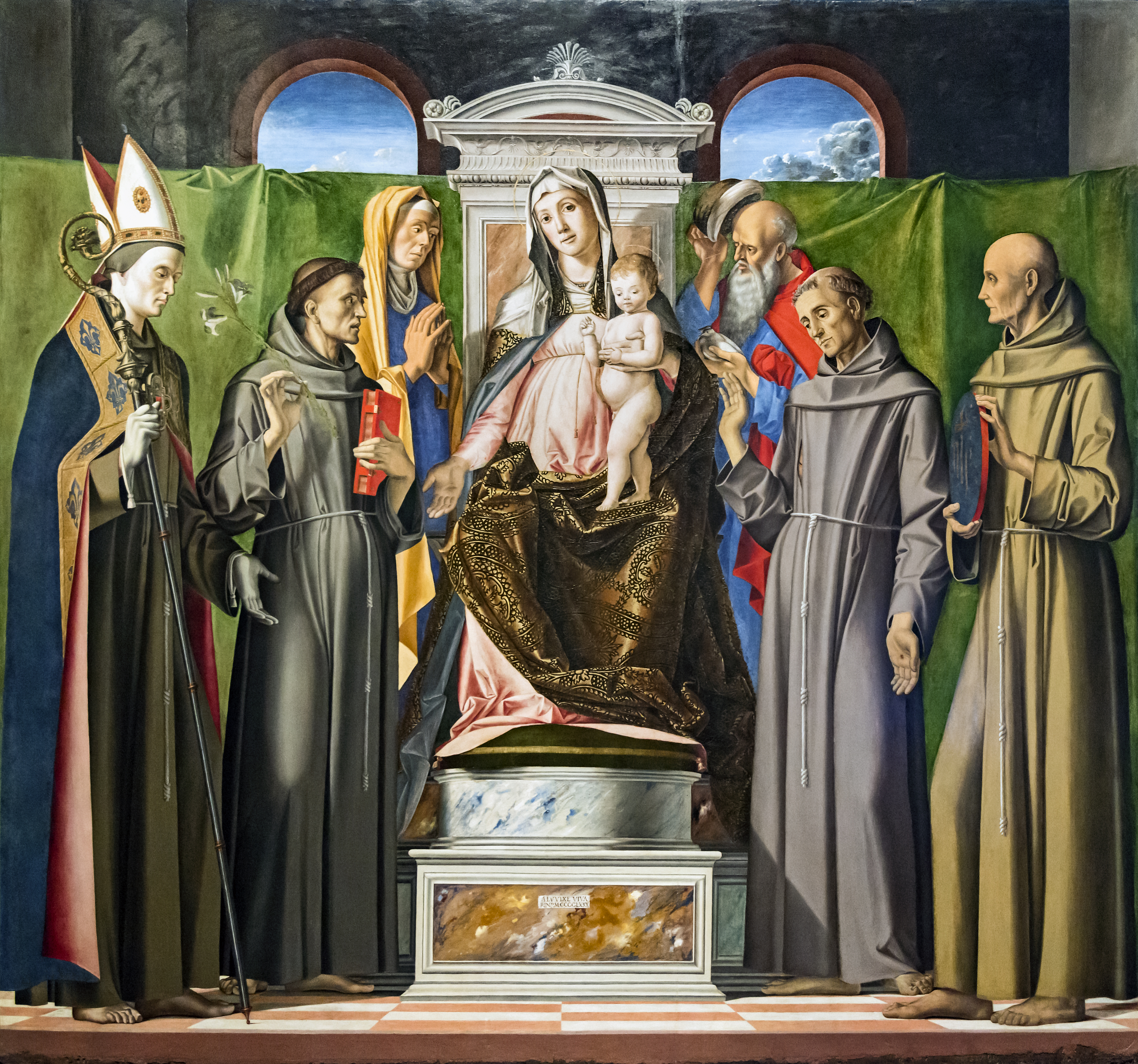
In Alvise Vivarini's painting, Anthony is distinguished from the other saints by his attributes: the book and the white lily stalk.

After his ordination to the priesthood, Fernando was named guestmaster at the age of 19, and placed in charge of hospitality for the abbey. While he was in Coimbra, some Friars Minor arrived and settled at a small hermitage outside Coimbra dedicated to St. Anthony the Great. Fernando was strongly attracted to the simple, evangelical lifestyle of the friars, whose order had been founded only 11 years prior. News arrived that five Franciscans had been beheaded in Morocco, the first of their order to be killed. King Afonso II of Portugal ransomed their bodies to be returned and buried as martyrs in the Monastery of the Holy Cross. Inspired by their example, Fernando obtained permission from church authorities to leave the Canons Regular to join the new Franciscan order. Upon his admission to the life of the friars, he joined the small hermitage in Olivais, adopting the name Anthony (from the name of the chapel located there, dedicated to Anthony the Great), by which he was to be known.

Anthony then set out for Morocco, in fulfilment of his new vocation. However, he fell seriously ill in Morocco and set sail back for Portugal in hope of regaining his health. On the return voyage, the ship was pushed off course and landed in Sicily.

From Sicily, he made his way to Tuscany, where he was assigned to a convent of the order, but he was met with difficulty on account of his sickly appearance. He was finally assigned to the rural hermitage of Montepaolo di Dovadola ('mount of Saint Paul of Dovadola'), near Forlì, in Romagna, a choice made after considering his poor health. There, he had recourse to a cell one of the friars had made in a nearby cave, spending time in private prayer and study.

=== Preaching and teaching ===
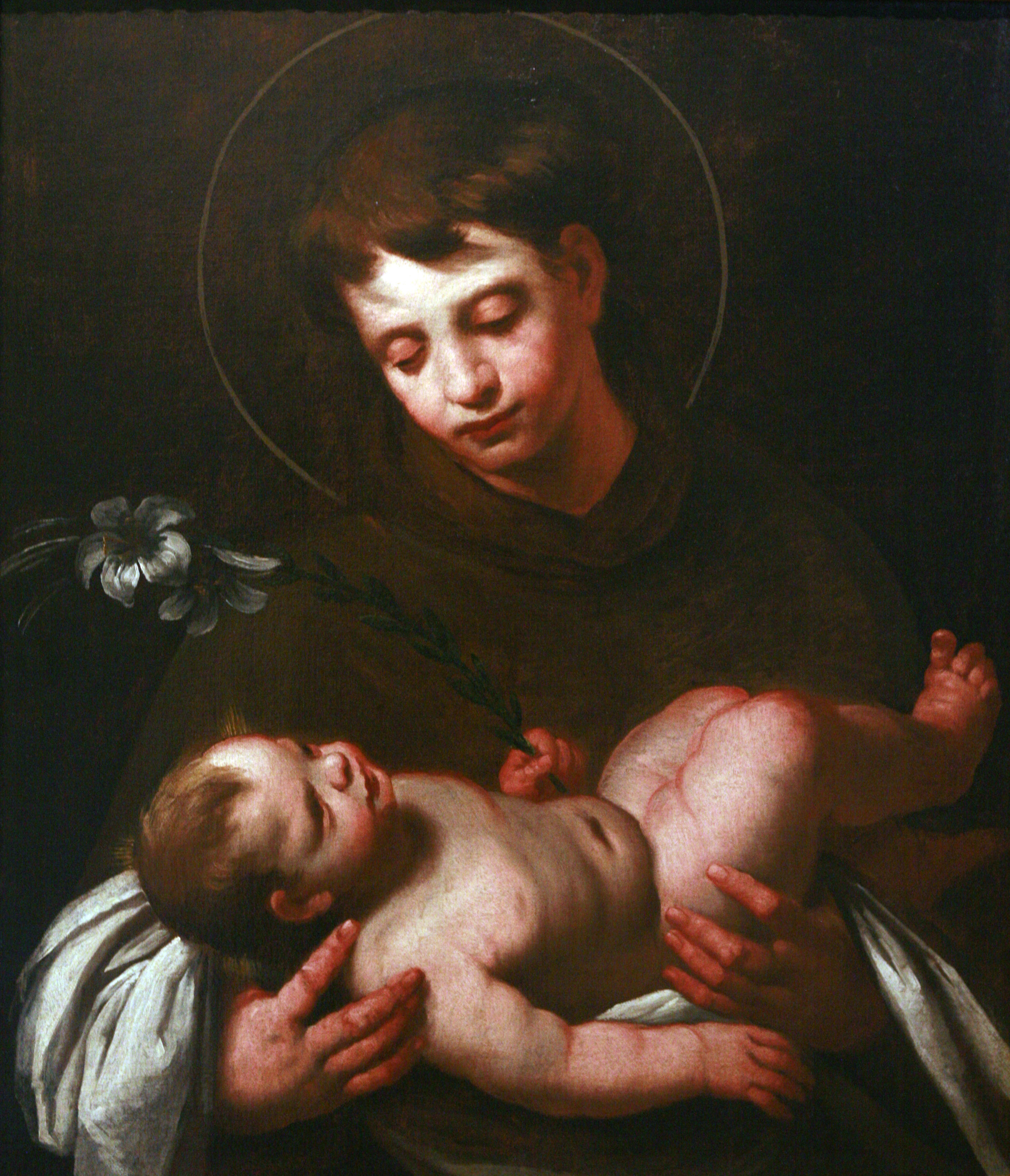
Saint Anthony of Padua holding the Infant Jesus by Strozzi, c. 1625; the white lily represents purity.

In 1222, in the town of Forlì, a number of visiting Dominican friars were present for the occasion of an ordination, and a misunderstanding arose over who should preach. The Franciscans had expected that one of the Dominicans would occupy the pulpit, being renowned for their preaching. However, the Dominicans had come unprepared, thinking a Franciscan would be the homilist. In this quandary, the head of the hermitage, who did not think any of his own humble friars could give a homily for the occasion, called upon Anthony, whom he suspected was most qualified, and entreated him to speak whatever the Holy Spirit might inspire. Anthony objected, but was overruled, and his impromptu sermon created a deep impression on his audience. His audience was moved not only by his rich voice and arresting manner, but also by the theme and substance of his discourse, his deep knowledge of scripture, and the eloquence with which he delivered his message.

Anthony was then sent by Brother Gratian, the local minister provincial, to the Franciscan province of Romagna, based in Bologna. He soon came to the attention of the founder of the order, Francis of Assisi. Francis had held a strong distrust of the place of theological studies in the life of the Friars Minor, fearing it might lead to an abandonment of their commitment to a life of real poverty and service. In Anthony, however, he found a kindred spirit who shared his vision and could also provide the teaching any young members of the order seeking ordination might need. In 1224, he entrusted the pursuit of studies for any of his friars to the care of Anthony.

The traditional practice of praying for St. Anthony's help in finding lost or stolen things is traced to an incident during his lifetime that occurred in Bologna. According to the story, Anthony had a Book of Psalms that was important to him, as it contained his notes and comments for use in teaching his students. A novice who had chosen to leave had taken the psalter with him. Prior to the invention of the printing press, any book was hand-copied, and thus, an item of high value; a Franciscan friar in particular, given his vow of poverty, would have found such an item difficult to replace. When Anthony realized his psalter was missing, he prayed it would be found or returned, after which the thief was moved to not only return the book to Anthony, but also return to the order. The stolen book is said to be preserved in the Franciscan friary in Bologna.

Occasionally, Anthony took another post as a teacher at universities like University of Montpellier and University of Toulouse in southern France, but his preaching was considered to be his supreme gift. According to historian Sophronius Clasen, Anthony preached "the grandeur of Christianity". His method included allegory and symbolical explanation of scripture. In 1226, after attending the general chapter of his order held at Arles, France, and preaching in the region of Provence, Anthony returned to Italy and was appointed Provincial superior of northern Italy. He chose the city of Padua as his location.

In 1228, he served as envoy from the general chapter to Pope Gregory IX. At the papal court, his preaching was hailed as a "jewel case of the Bible" and he was commissioned to produce his collection of sermons, Sermons for Feast Days (Sermones in Festivitates). Gregory IX described Anthony as the "Ark of the Testament" (Doctor Arca testamenti).

=== Death ===
Anthony became sick with ergotism in 1231 and went to the woodland retreat at Camposampiero with two other friars for a respite. There, he lived in a room built for him under the branches of a walnut tree. Anthony died on the way back to Padua on 13 June 1231 at the Poor Clare monastery at Arcella (now part of Padua), at the age of 35.

As he had requested, Anthony was buried in the small church of Santa Maria Mater Domini—probably dating from the late 12th century—near a convent he had founded in 1229. Because of his notability, the construction of a large church, now the Basilica of Saint Anthony of Padua, was begun around 1232 and completed in 1301. The smaller church was incorporated into the structure as the Cappella della Madonna Mora or Chapel of the Dark Madonna. Today the basilica is commonly referred to as "Il Santo" (The Saint).

Various accounts also surround the death of Anthony. One holds that when he died, children cried in the streets and all the church bells rang of their own accord. According to another account, when he was initially buried his tongue, jaw, and vocal cords were chosen as relics for veneration and displayed in a large reliquary. When his body was exhumed 30 years after his death, it was found turned to dust, but the tongue was observed to have glistened and looked as if it were still part of a live body; a further observation being made that this was a sign of his gift of preaching. On 1 January 1981, Pope John Paul II authorized a scientific team to study Anthony's remains and the tomb was opened five days later.

== Miracles ==
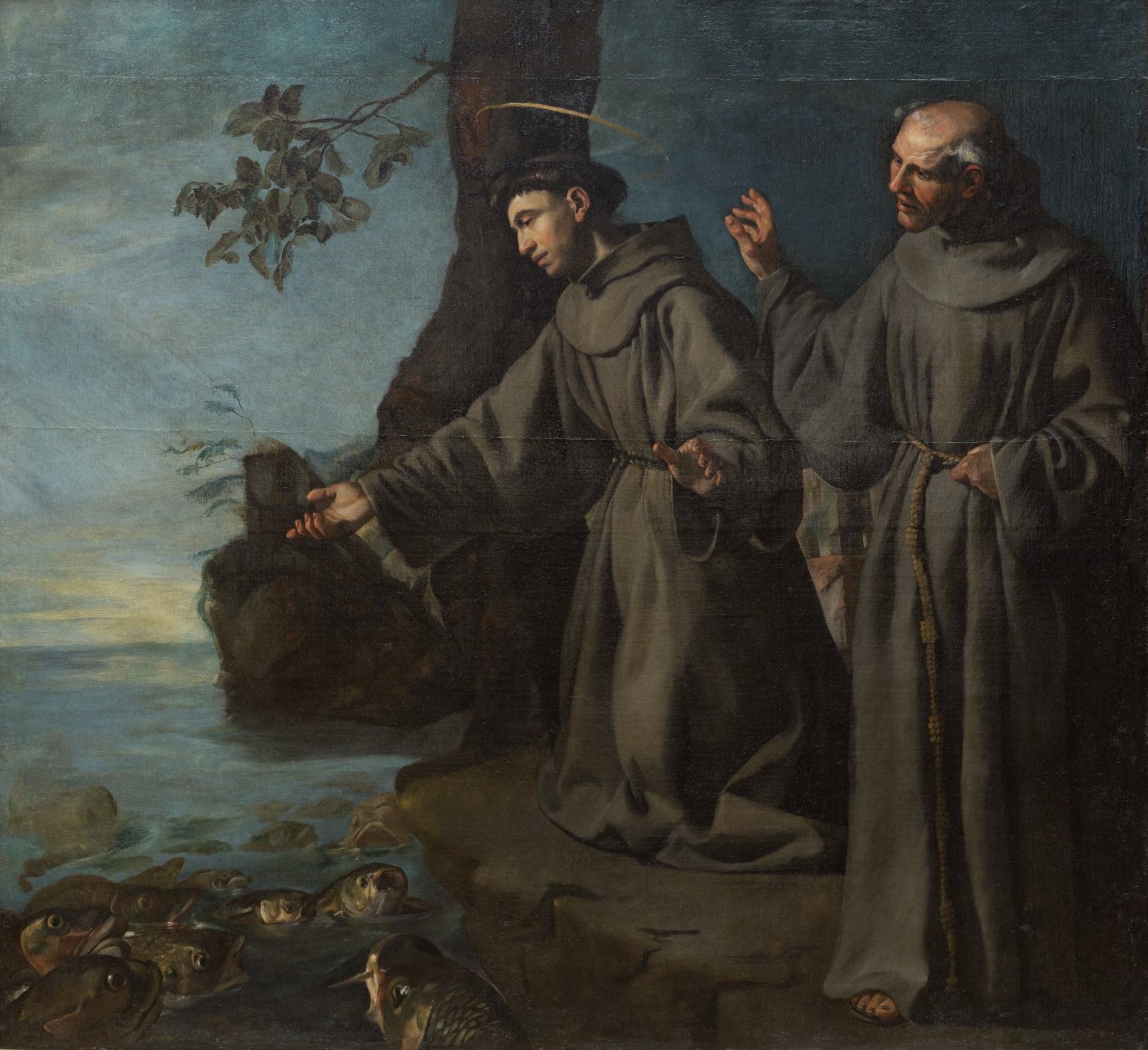
Saint Anthony Preaching to the Fishes, c. 1630

=== Preaching to the fish ===
The story of Anthony preaching to the fish originated in Rimini, where he had gone to preach. When heretics there treated him with contempt, Anthony was said to have gone to the shoreline, where he began to preach at the water's edge until a great crowd of fish was seen gathered before him. The people of the town and even heretics flocked to see this marvelous thing and were moved to listen to Anthony's preaching.

=== Miracle of the mule ===
In another often-told story known as the miracle of the mule, which took place also in Rimini, Anthony was challenged by a heretic to prove the reality of the presence of Christ in the Eucharist. The man, who sought to mock Anthony, brought out a half-starved mule and showed it fresh fodder. Saint Anthony showed the mule the monstrance containing the Blessed Sacrament. The mule ignored the fodder and bowed before the Blessed Sacrament. The Tempietto of Sant'Antonio marks the spot where the miracle took place. Other versions of this miracle place it in Toulouse or Bourges.

=== Dinner with heretics ===
Another account tells of an occasion in Italy when Anthony was dining with heretics. He realized the food they put before him was poisoned, and he confronted them. The men admitted to attempting to kill him, but then challenged him to eat if he truly believed the words spoken in Mark 16:18 about the apostles of Christ: "And if they drink any deadly thing, it will not harm them". Anthony is said to have blessed the food and eaten it without harm, much to the amazement of his hosts.

== Canonisation and title ==
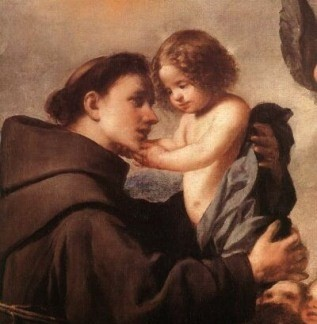
Anthony of Padua with the Infant Jesus by Antonio de Pereda, detail

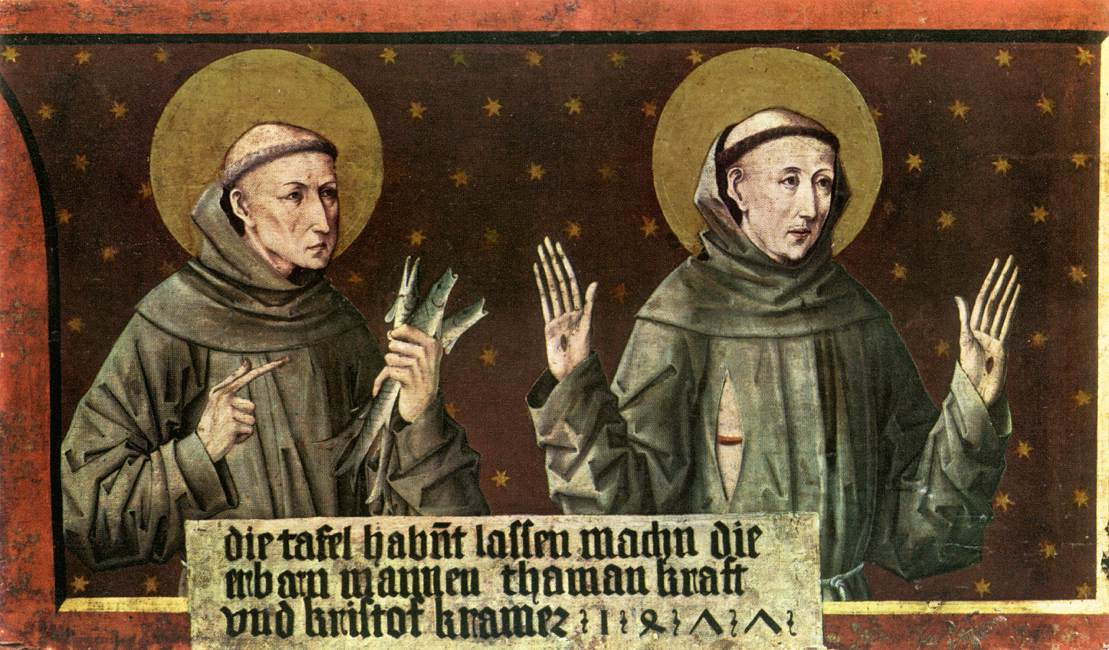
St Anthony of Padua and St Francis of Assisi by Friedrich Pacher

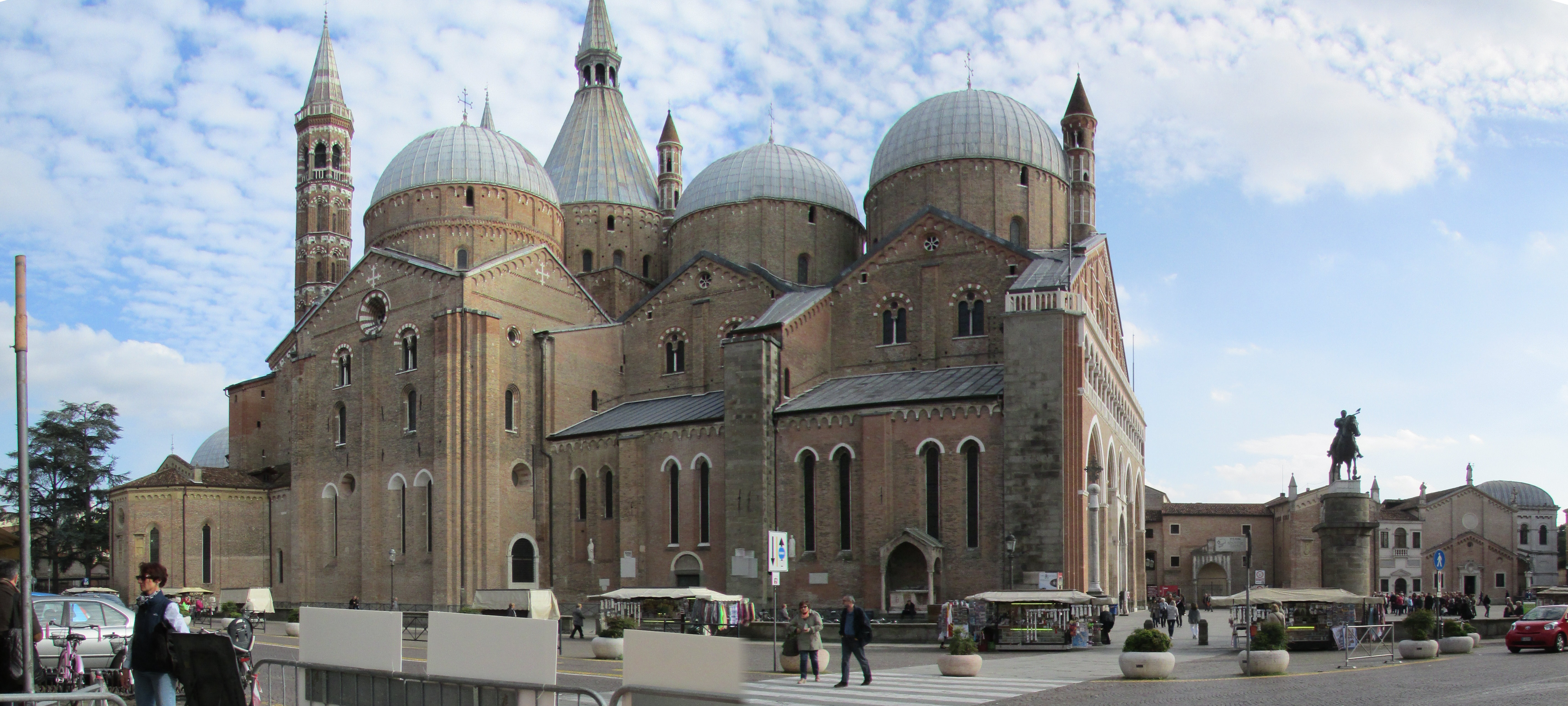
Basilica of Saint Anthony of Padua – Padua, Italy

Anthony was canonized by Pope Gregory IX on 30 May 1232, at Spoleto, Italy, less than one year after his death. Noted by his contemporaries for his powerful preaching, expert knowledge of scripture, and undying love and devotion to the poor and the sick, he was one of the most quickly canonized persons in Catholic church history. He was later titled Doctor of the Church by Pope Pius XII on 16 January 1946. In the words of Pope Benedict XVI:

The richness of spiritual teaching contained in the Sermons was so great that in 1946 Venerable Pope Pius XII proclaimed Anthony a Doctor of the Church, attributing to him the title Doctor evangelicus, since the freshness and beauty of the Gospel emerge from these writings.

== Veneration ==
Anthony's fame spread through Portuguese evangelization, and he has been known as the most celebrated of the followers of Francis of Assisi. He is the patron saint of Padua and many places in Portugal and in the countries of the former Portuguese Empire.

He is especially invoked and venerated all over the world as the patron saint for the recovery of lost items and is credited with many miracles involving lost people, lost things and even lost spiritual goods.

=== North America ===
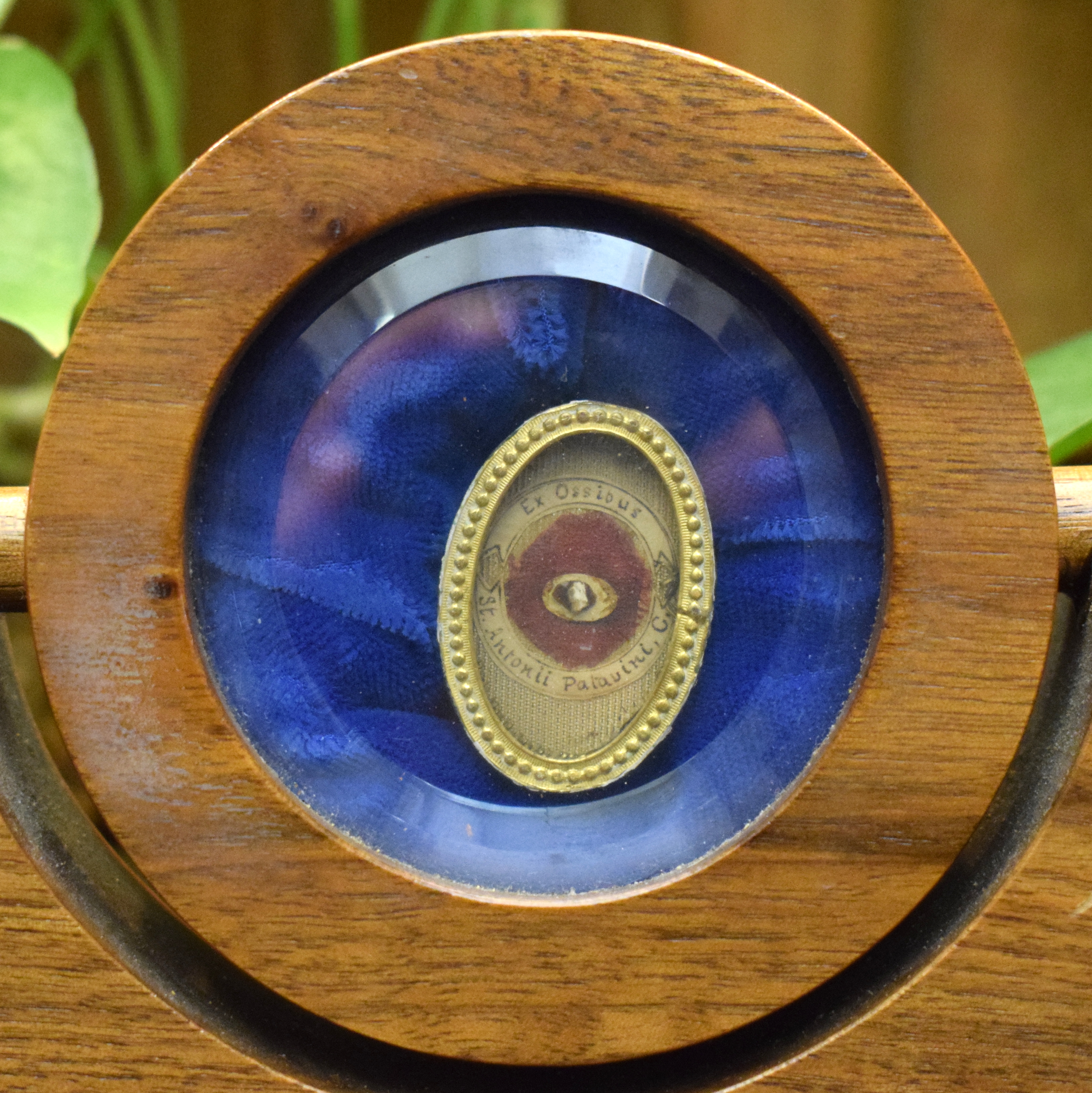
First class relic of Anthony displayed at the National Shrine of St. Anthony of Padua and Friary (Cincinnati, Ohio)

In 1692, Spanish missionaries came across a small Payaya Indian community along what was then known as the Yanaguana River on the feast day of Saint Anthony, 13 June. The Franciscan chaplain, Father Damien Massanet, with agreement from General Domingo de Teran, renamed the rivers in his honor, and eventually built a mission nearby, as well. This mission became the focal point of a small community that eventually grew in size and scope to become the seventh-largest city in the country, the U.S. city of San Antonio, Texas.

In New York City, the St. Anthony of Padua Church in Greenwich Village celebrates his feast day, starting with the traditional novena of prayers asking for Anthony's intercession on the 13 Tuesdays preceding his feast. This culminates with a week-long series of services and a street fair. A traditional Italian-style procession is held that day through the streets of its South Village neighborhood, during which a relic of the saint is carried for veneration.

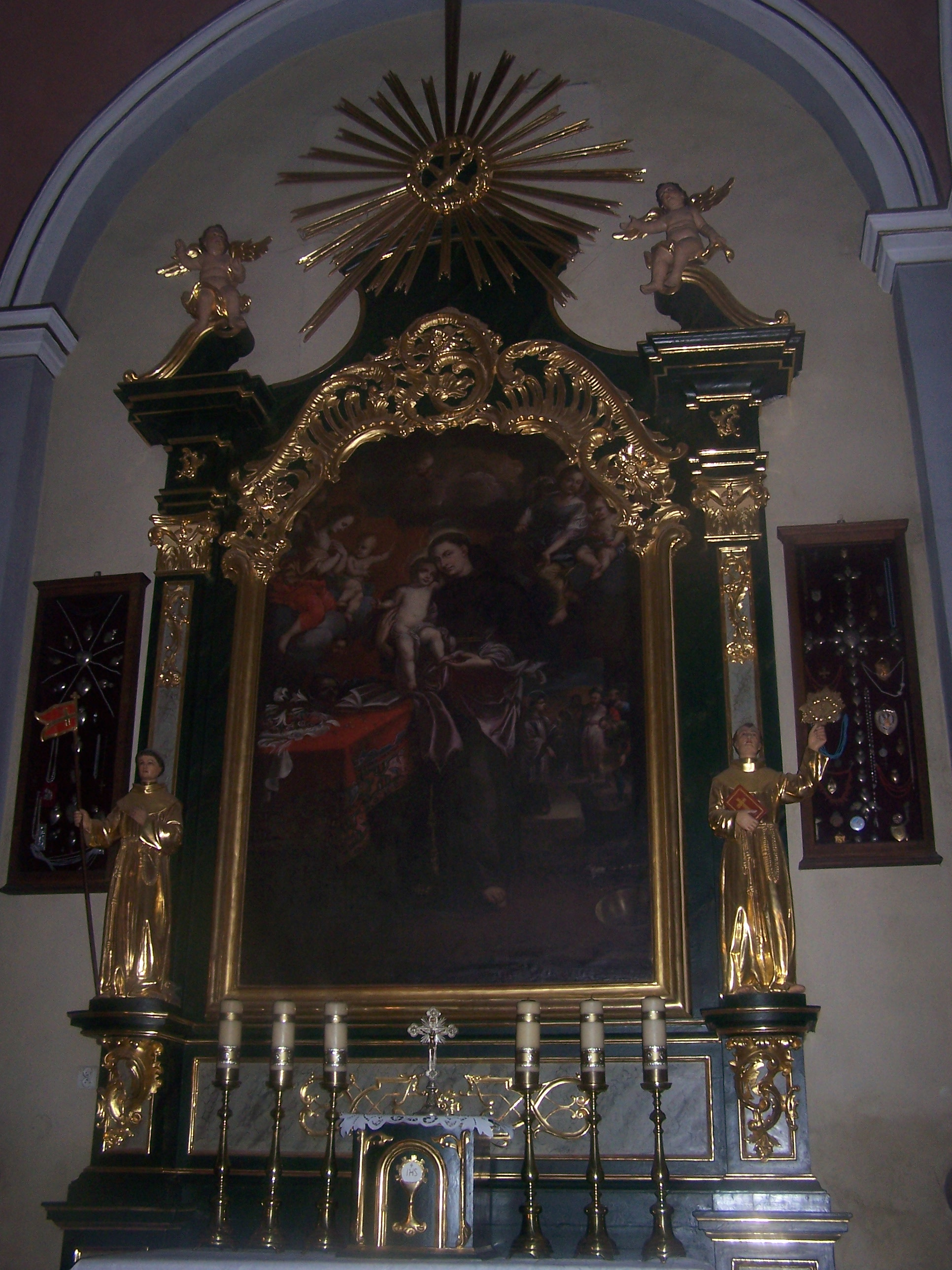
Miraculous Image of Saint Anthony, by Franciszek Lekszycki OFM, 1649, Przeworsk, Poland

Each year on the weekend of the last Sunday in August, Boston's North End holds a feast in honor of Saint Anthony. Referred to as the "Feast of All Feasts", Saint Anthony's Feast in Boston's North End was begun in 1919 by Italian immigrants from Montefalcione, a small town near Naples, where the tradition of honoring Saint Anthony goes back to 1688.

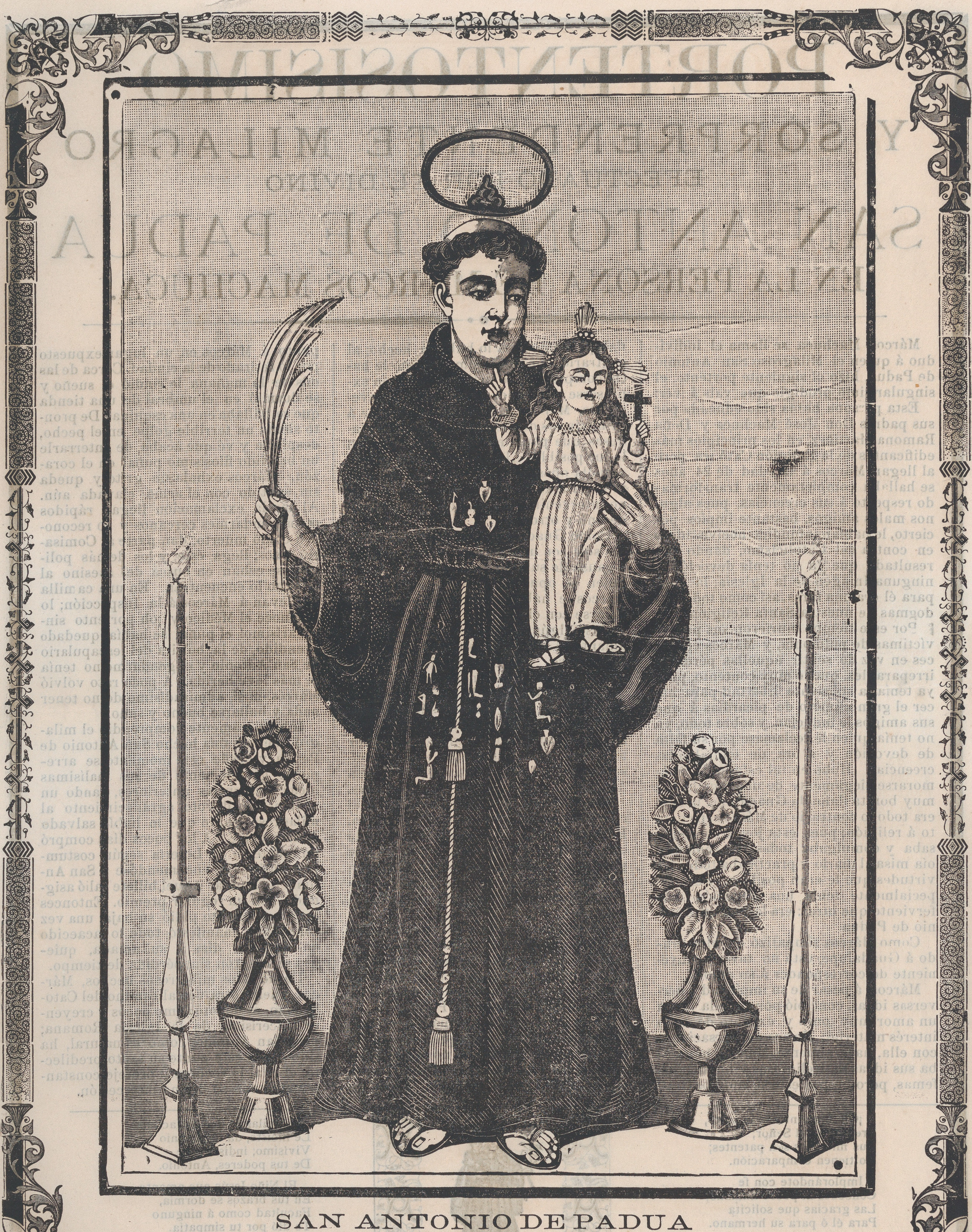
José Guadalupe Posada print of Saint Anthony, about 1910

Each year the Sandia Pueblo along with Santa Clara Pueblo celebrates the feast day of Saint Anthony with traditional Native American dances.

On 27 January 1907, in Beaumont, Texas, a church was dedicated and named in honor of Saint Anthony. The church was later designated a cathedral in 1966 with the formation of the Roman Catholic Diocese of Beaumont, but was not formally consecrated. On 28 April 1974, St. Anthony Cathedral was dedicated and consecrated by Bishop Warren Boudreaux. In 2006, Pope Benedict XVI granted the cathedral the designation of minor basilica. St. Anthony Cathedral Basilica celebrated its 100th anniversary on 28 January 2007.

The St. Anthony Monastery was founded by Lithuanian Franciscans in Kennebunk, Maine in 1947. In October of 2025, pilgrims from the monastery were presented with a "first class relic" of St. Anthony by the Franciscan Friars of Padua, while on a Holy Year pilgrimage to Italy. The grounds are open to the public for walking, reverence, and meditation, and the Franciscan monastery remains active today.

St. Anthony gives his name to Mission San Antonio de Padua, the third Franciscan mission dedicated along El Camino Real in California in 1771.

In Ellicott City, Maryland, southwest of Baltimore, the Conventual Franciscans of the St. Anthony Province dedicated their old novitiate house as the Shrine of St. Anthony which since 1 July 2004 serves as the official shrine to Saint Anthony for the Archdiocese of Baltimore.

=== Portugal, Spain and Brazil ===
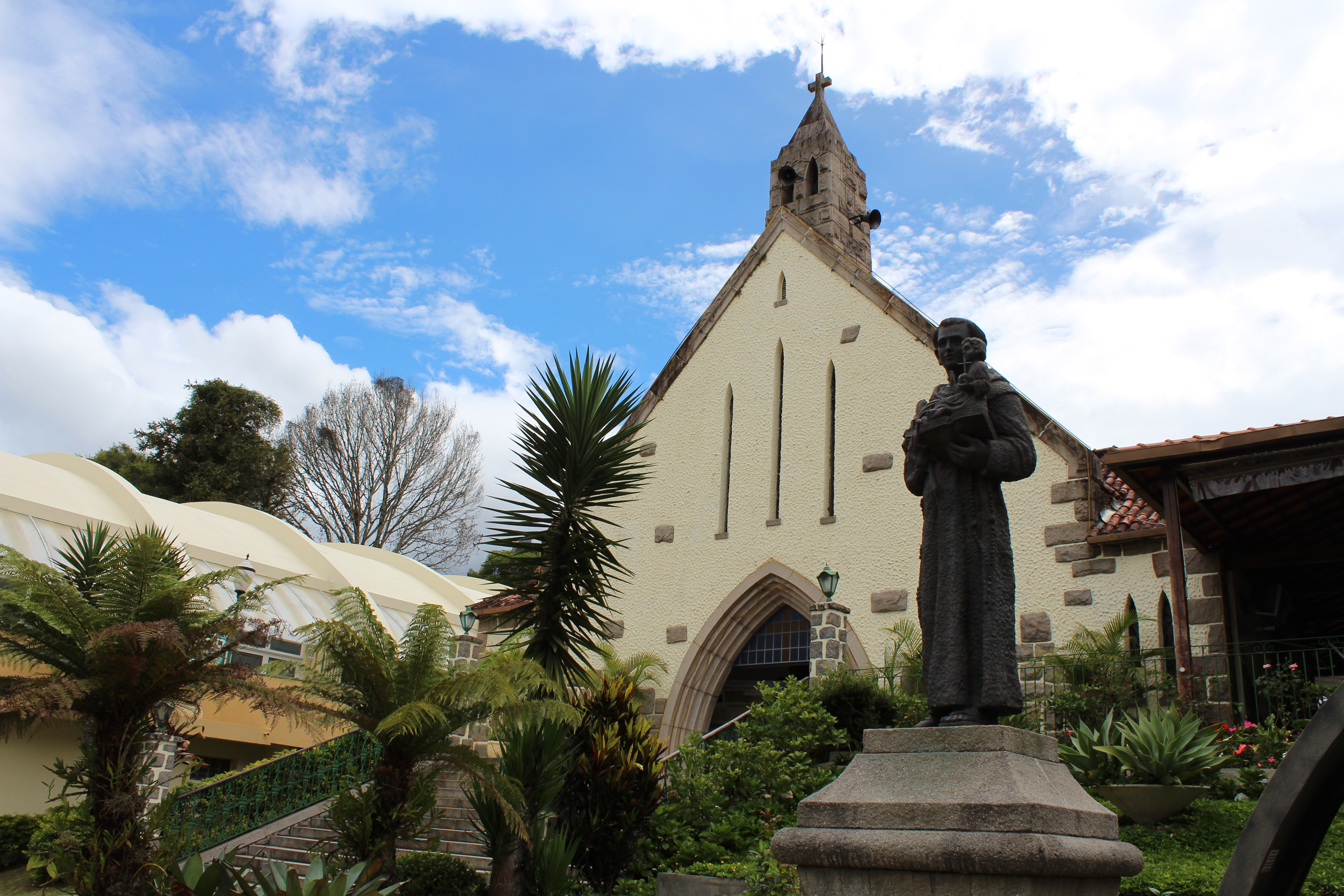
Santo Antônio (Saint Anthony) Church in Teresópolis, Brazil

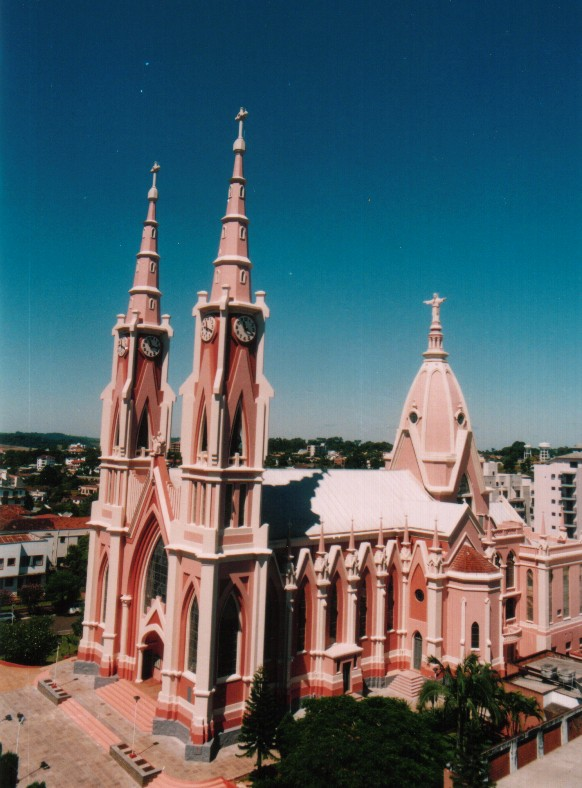
Cathedral of the diocese of Santo Antônio, in the municipality of Frederico Westphalen, northwest of the state of Rio Grande do Sul, Brazil.

Saint Anthony is known in Portugal, Spain, and Brazil as a marriage saint, because legends exist of him reconciling couples. His feast day, 13 June, is Lisbon's municipal holiday, celebrated with parades and marriages. He is one of the saints celebrated in the Brazilian Festa Junina, along with John the Baptist and Saint Peter. The festivities arount him, specifically, is known as the "Trezena de Junho", or thirteenth of June, when devotion to St. Anthony intensifies in the days leading up to his feast. Saint Anthony is patron saint of at least 105 cities through Brazil, in 10 states, being one of the most venerated saints in that country. In 1918, the region in Maranhão previously known as "Furo" was renamed as "Porto de Santo Antônio" in his homage, being renamed in 1925 as "Magalhães de Almeida".

He is venerated in Mogán Village in Gran Canaria, where his feast day is celebrated every year with oversized objects carried through the streets for the fiesta.

=== The rest of Europe ===
==== Albania ====
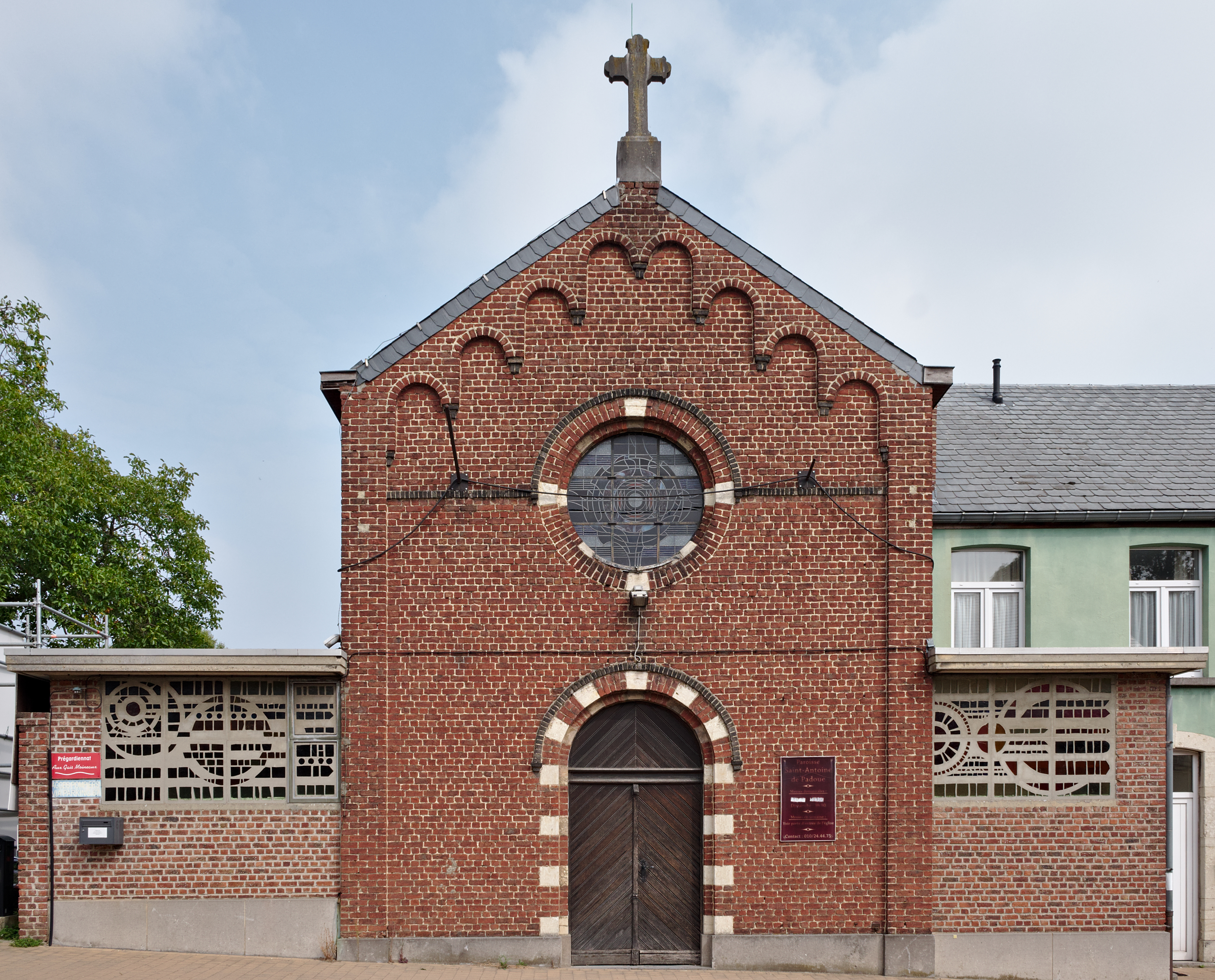
Saint-Antoine de Padoue parish in Wavre, Belgium

In Albania, the Franciscans arrived in 1240 spreading the word of Saint Anthony (Shna Ndou). The St. Anthony Church, Laç (Albanian: Kisha e Shna Ndout or Kisha e Laçit) in Laç was built in 1300 and in 1557 was renamed after him in his honor. It was built on a place previously held sacred by pagan sun worshippers and became a place of pilgrimage for Roman Catholic and Orthodox Christians as well as Muslims for its purported miraculous healing powers. In 1964, the church was mostly destroyed by the communist regime in Albania but the walls still remained. In 1981, Albanian Communist soldiers arrived to completely remove all trace of the church. After demolishing one wall, it is reported that 32 soldiers were miraculously paralyzed from the waist down. The Communist authorities claimed it was food poisoning and attempted to suppress media coverage of the reported miracle. The church attracts over a million pilgrims every year. The pilgrimage traditionally starts on 12 June with pilgrims gathering before the full pilgrimage walk to the church. As part of the pilgrimage, some pilgrims take five white stones and whisper to each before putting them back, whilst others approach the church barefoot and place their feet into cracks in the rocks. Saint Anthony is one of the most important saints amongst Albanians and the pilgrimage to his church is done yearly by a considerable number of Eastern Orthodox and Muslim Albanians as well.

==== Italy ====
In the town of Brusciano, Italy, located near Naples, an annual feast in honor of Saint Anthony is held in late August. This tradition dates back to 1875. The tradition started when a man prayed to Saint Anthony for his sick son to get better. He vowed that if his son would become healthy he would build and dance a giglio like the people of Nola do for their patron San Paolino during the annual Fest Dei Gigli. (A giglio is a tall tower topped with a statue of the saint that is carried through the streets in carefully choreographed maneuvers that resemble a dance.) The celebration has grown over the years to include six giglio towers built in honor of the saint. This tradition has also carried over to America, specifically the East Harlem area of New York, where the immigrants from the town of Brusciano formed the Giglio Society of East Harlem and have been holding their annual feast since the early 1900s.

==== Poland ====
In Poland, he is the patron saint of Przeworsk. The icon of Saint Anthony, dating from 1649, is housed in a local Franciscan church, Kaplica Świętego Antoniego w Przeworsku.

==== Turkey ====
In Turkey, there is a Church of St. Anthony of Padua built in 1906-1912.

==== United Kingdom ====
In the United Kingdom, there is a St Anthony of Padua, Oxford, built in 1960 in the suburb of Headington. J.R.R. Tolkien was a parishioner while he lived nearby.

=== Asia ===
==== India ====
Saint Anthony is honored in Uvari, in Tamil Nadu, India, where legend holds that the crew of a Portuguese ship was cured of cholera through the intercession of St. Anthony. The local church is dedicated to St. Anthony and houses an ancient wooden statue believed to have been carved by one of the crew. In Kerala, where Vasco da Gama had landed in 1498 and where the Portuguese had their first stations in India some of the most ancient churches were renamed after St. Antony and new churches were dedicated to him.

In Siolim, a village in the Indian state of Goa, St. Anthony is always shown holding a serpent on a stick. This is a depiction of the incident which occurred during the construction of the church wherein a snake was disrupting construction work. The people turned to St. Anthony for help and placed his statue at the construction site. The next morning, the snake was found caught in the cord placed in the statue's hand.

==== Philippines ====
In the Philippines, the devotion to St. Anthony of Padua began in 1581, in the town of Pila, Laguna, where Franciscans established the first church in the country dedicated to St. Anthony of Padua, now elevated as the National Shrine of St. Anthony of Padua under the Diocese of San Pablo.

==== Sri Lanka ====
St. Anthony's Shrine, Kochchikade, located in Sri Lanka, is dedicated to the saint. The church is designated a national shrine and minor basilica. A tiny piece of St. Anthony's tongue is said to be preserved in a special reliquary, which is located in a glass case together with a statue of the saint, at the entrance to the church.

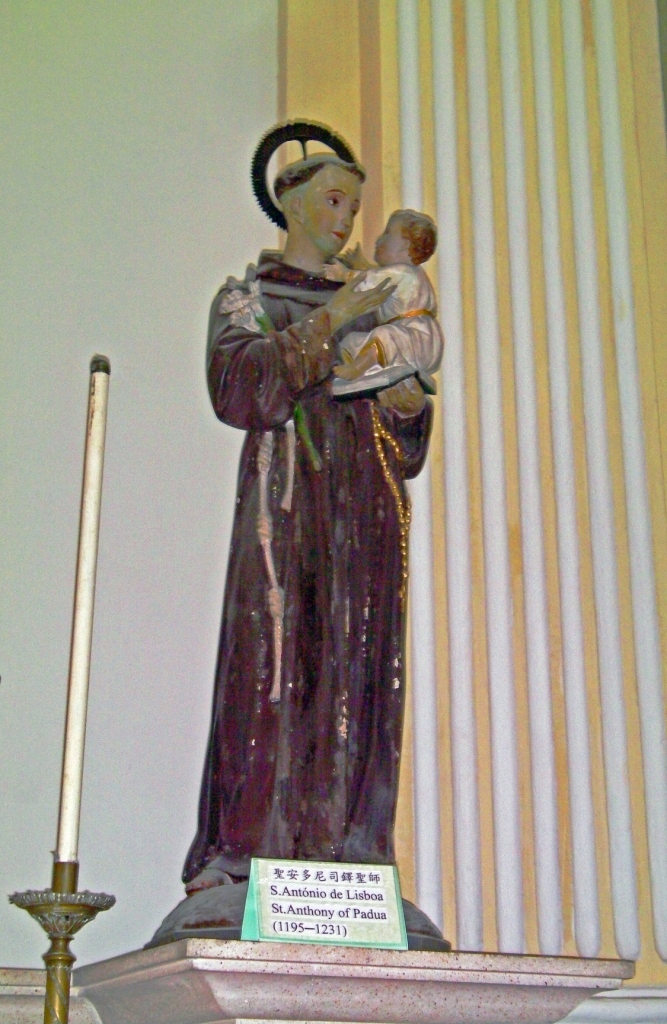
St. Anthony of Padua in St. Joseph's Church, Macao

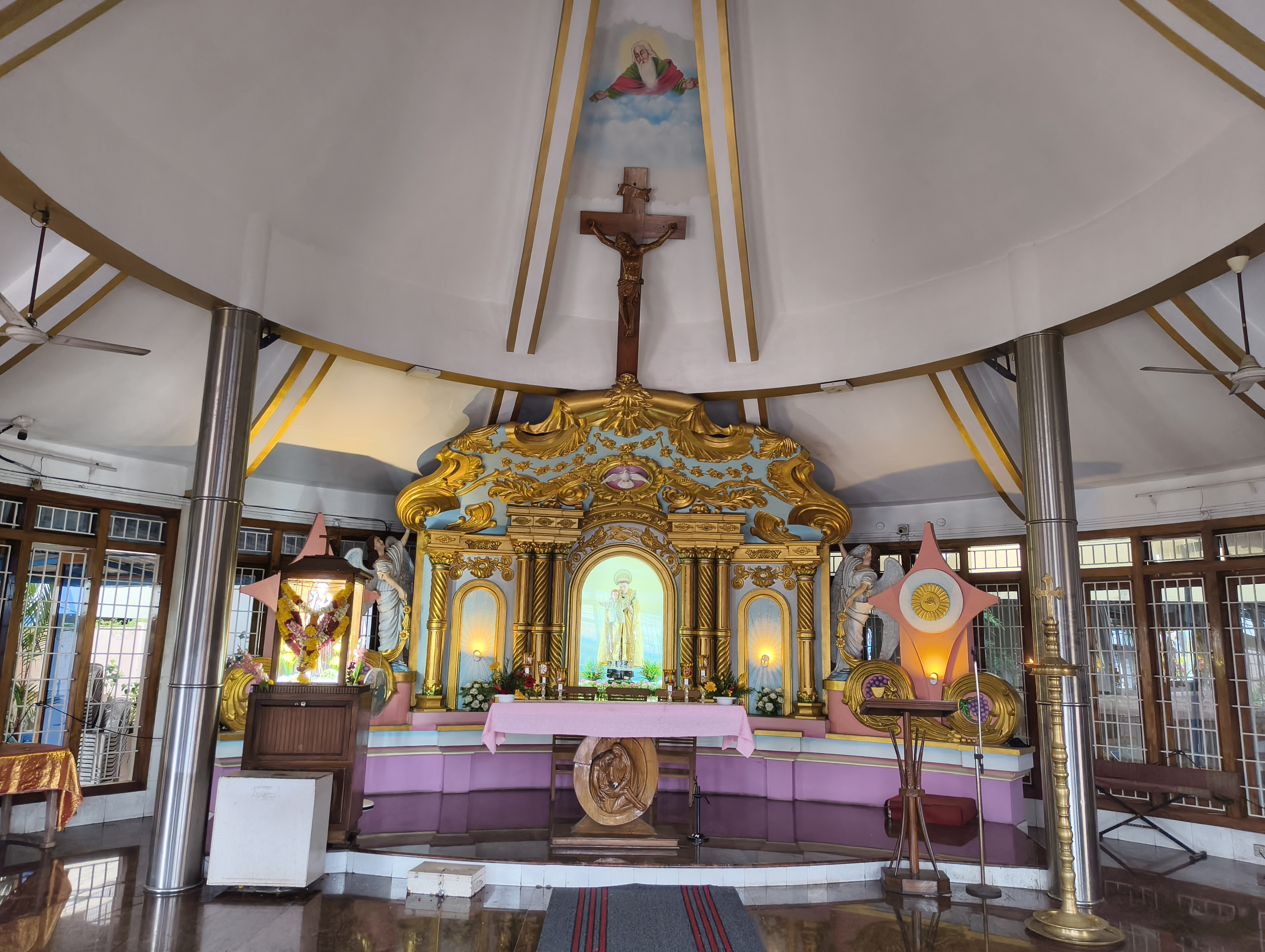
St Antony Shrine, Kundara in Kerala State of India

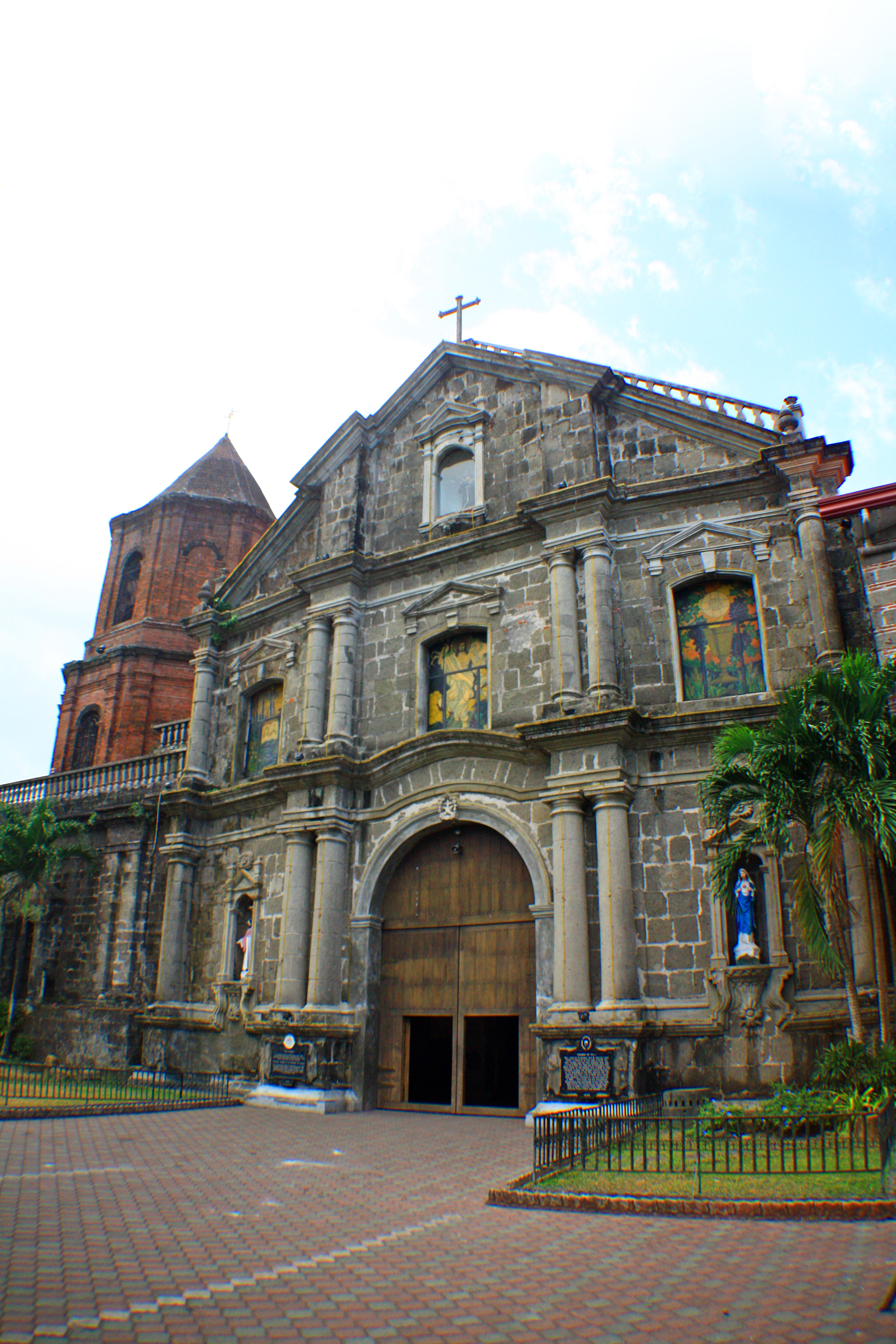
National Shrine of St. Anthony of Padua, Pila, Laguna, Philippines where Franciscans established the first church in the country dedicated to St. Anthony of Padua under the Diocese of San Pablo

=== Africa ===
==== Central Africa ====
Antonianism (Portuguese: antonianismo) was a syncretic Bakongo Catholic movement formed in the Kingdom of Kongo between 1704 and 1708 as a development out of the Roman Catholic Church in Kongo, yet without denying the authority of the Pope. Its founder was a young charismatic woman named Beatriz Kimpa Vita who said she was possessed by Saint Anthony of Padua. Beatriz became known for healing and other miracles. It was eventually suppressed by King Pedro IV of Kongo, and Dona Beatriz was burned at the stake as a heretic.

== In popular culture ==
=== In art and iconography ===
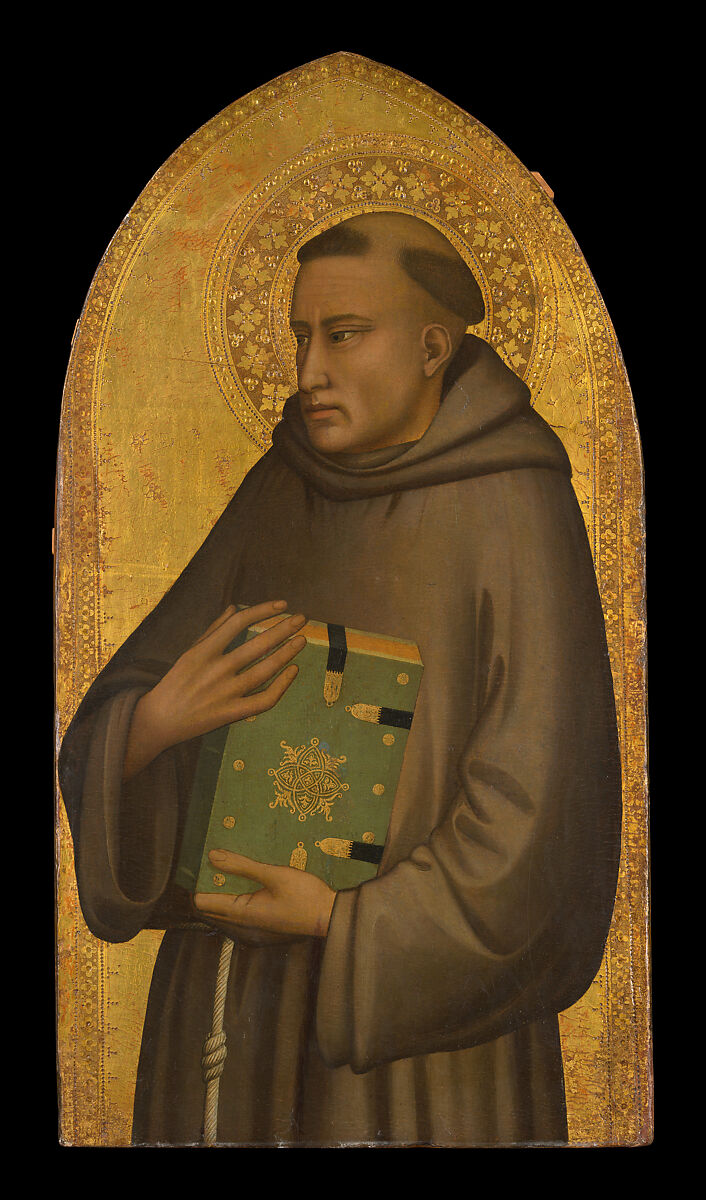
Maso di Banco's painting of Anthony of Padua, c. 1340. Part The Met collection, it was originally within a polyptych.

As the number of Franciscan saints increased, iconography struggled to distinguish Anthony from the others. Because of a legend that he had once preached to the fish by the mouth of the river Marecchia in Rimini, this was sometimes used as his attribute. He is also often seen with a white lily stalk, representing his purity. Other conventions referred to St. Anthony's visionary fervor. Thus, one attribute in use for some time was a flaming heart. He is also sometimes depicted along with the mule in Rimini that allegedly bowed down to him holding the Eucharist.

In 1511, Titian painted three large frescoes in the Scuola del Santo in Padua, depicting scenes of the miracles from the life of Saint Anthony: The Miracle of the Jealous Husband, which depicts the murder of a young woman by her husband; A Child Testifying to Its Mother's Innocence; and The Saint Healing the Young Man with a Broken Limb.

Another key pattern has him meditating on an open book in which the Christ Child himself appears, as in the El Greco below. Over time the child came to be shown considerably larger than the book and some images even do without the book entirely. He typically appears carrying the infant Jesus and holding a cross.

In popular votive offerings, Anthony is often depicted as miraculously saving individuals in various accidents.

Anthony of Padua in Art

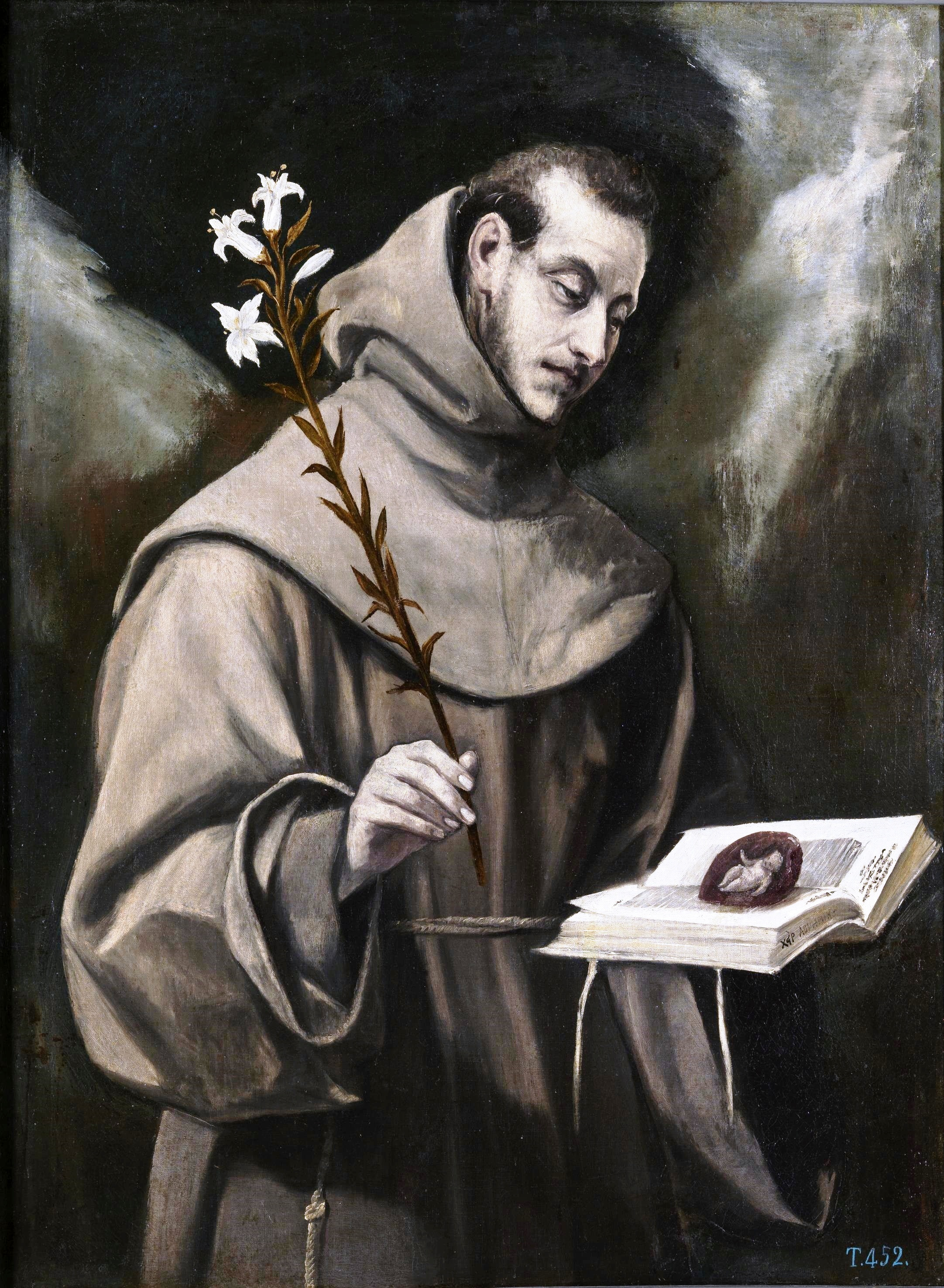
El Greco's painting, 1580, shows the book with an image of the Christ child on the page.

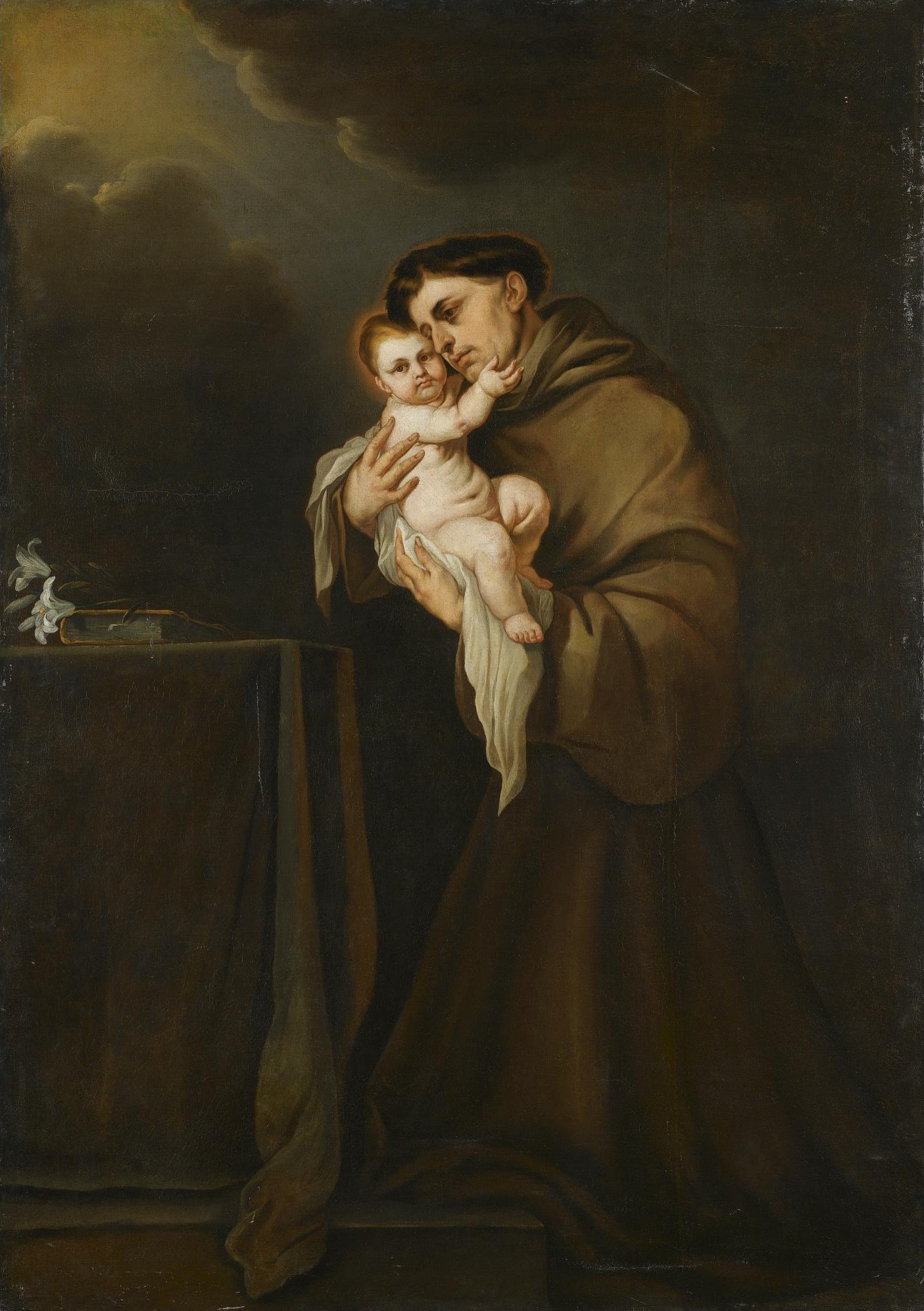
St. Antony of Padua by Giacomo Farelli

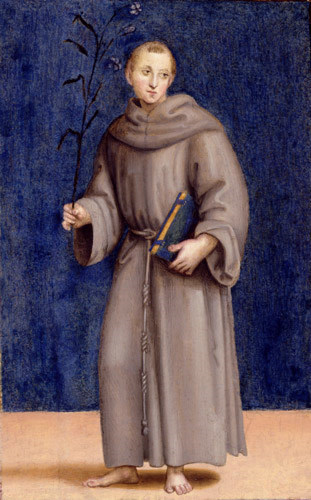
An early work by Raphael, 1503, at the Dulwich Picture Gallery, London, UK

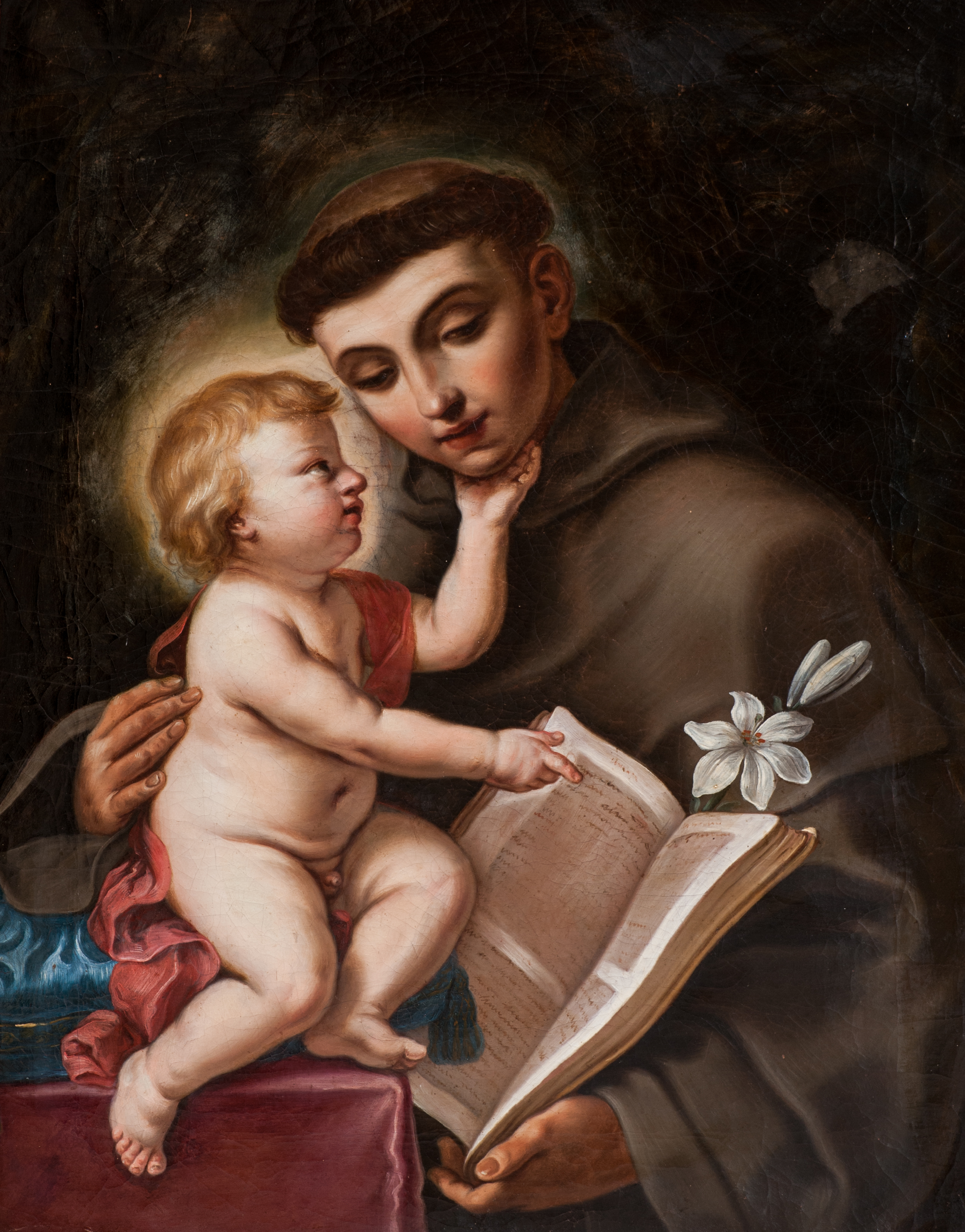
Baby Jesus with St. Anthony of Padua, Elisabetta Sirani, 1656, Bologna, Italy

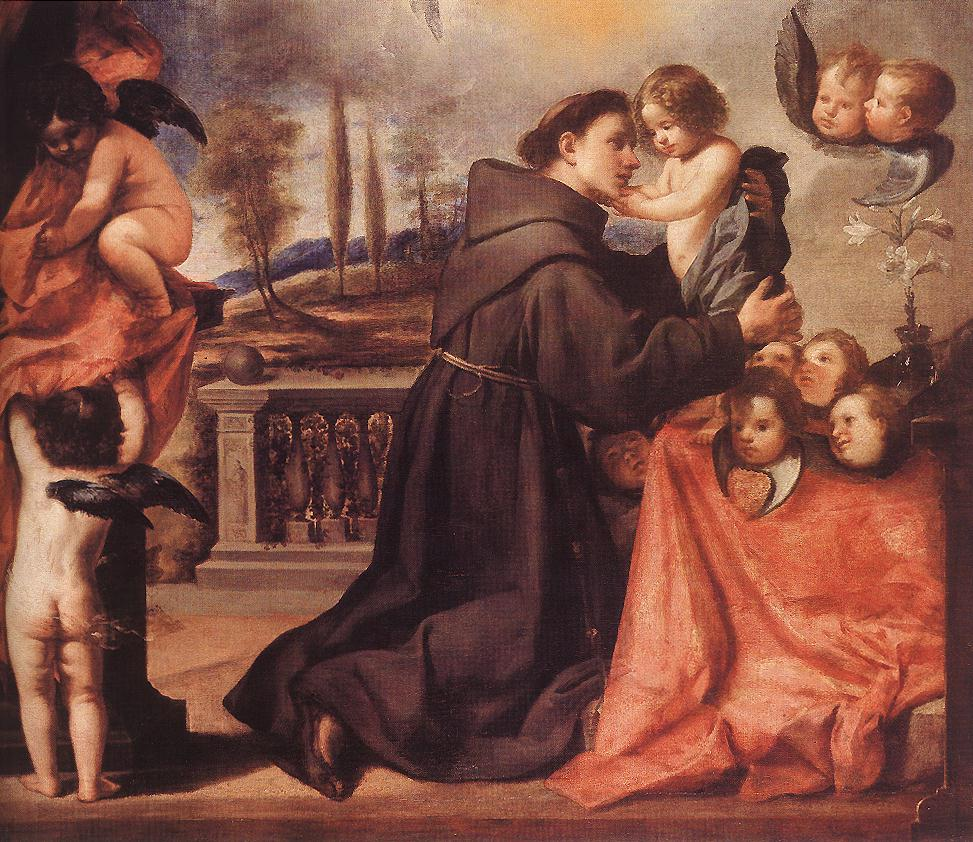
Anthony of Padua with the Infant Jesus by Antonio de Pereda

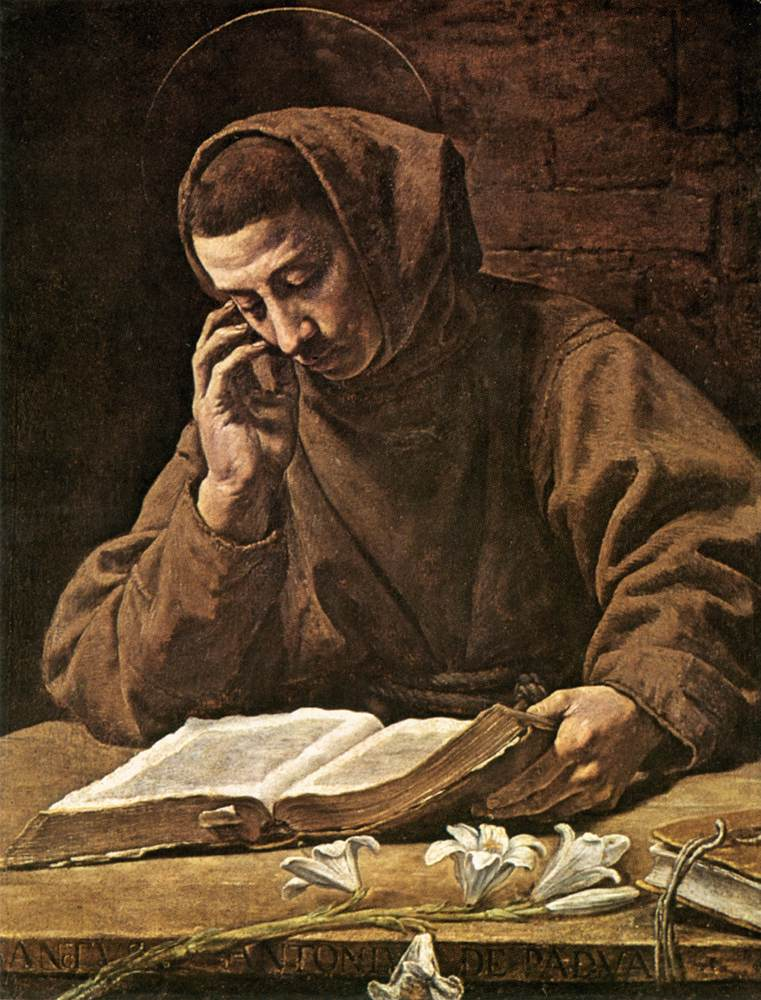
St Antony Reading, early 17th century, by Marco Antonio Bassetti

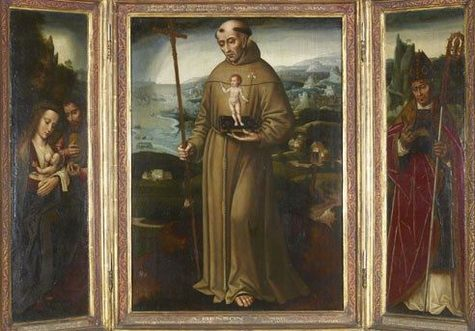
Triptych of Saint Antonius by Ambrosius Benson

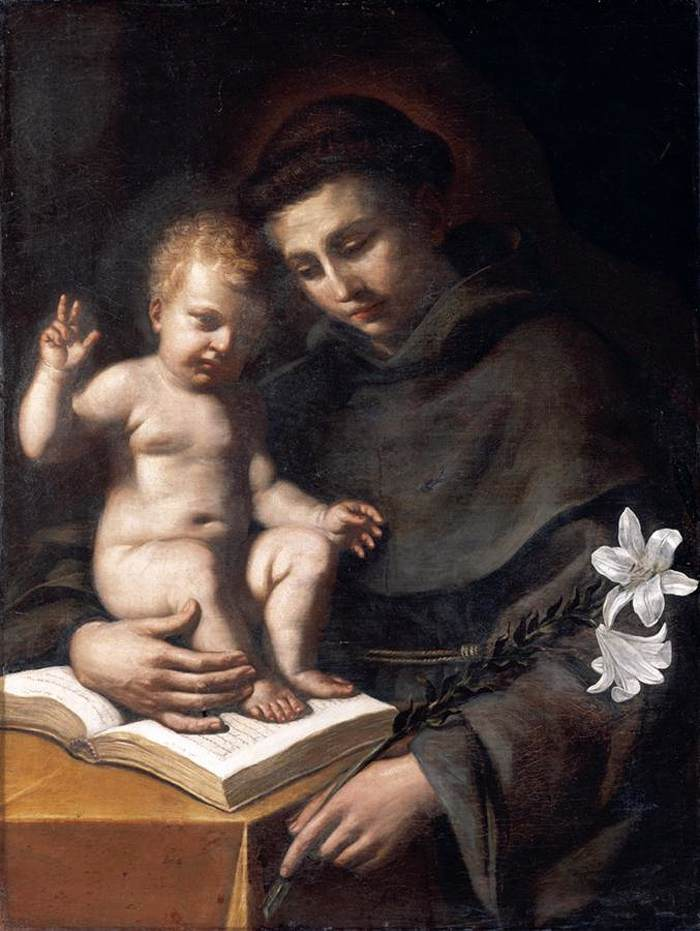
Saint Anthony of Padua with the Infant Christ by Guercino, 1656, Bologna, Italy

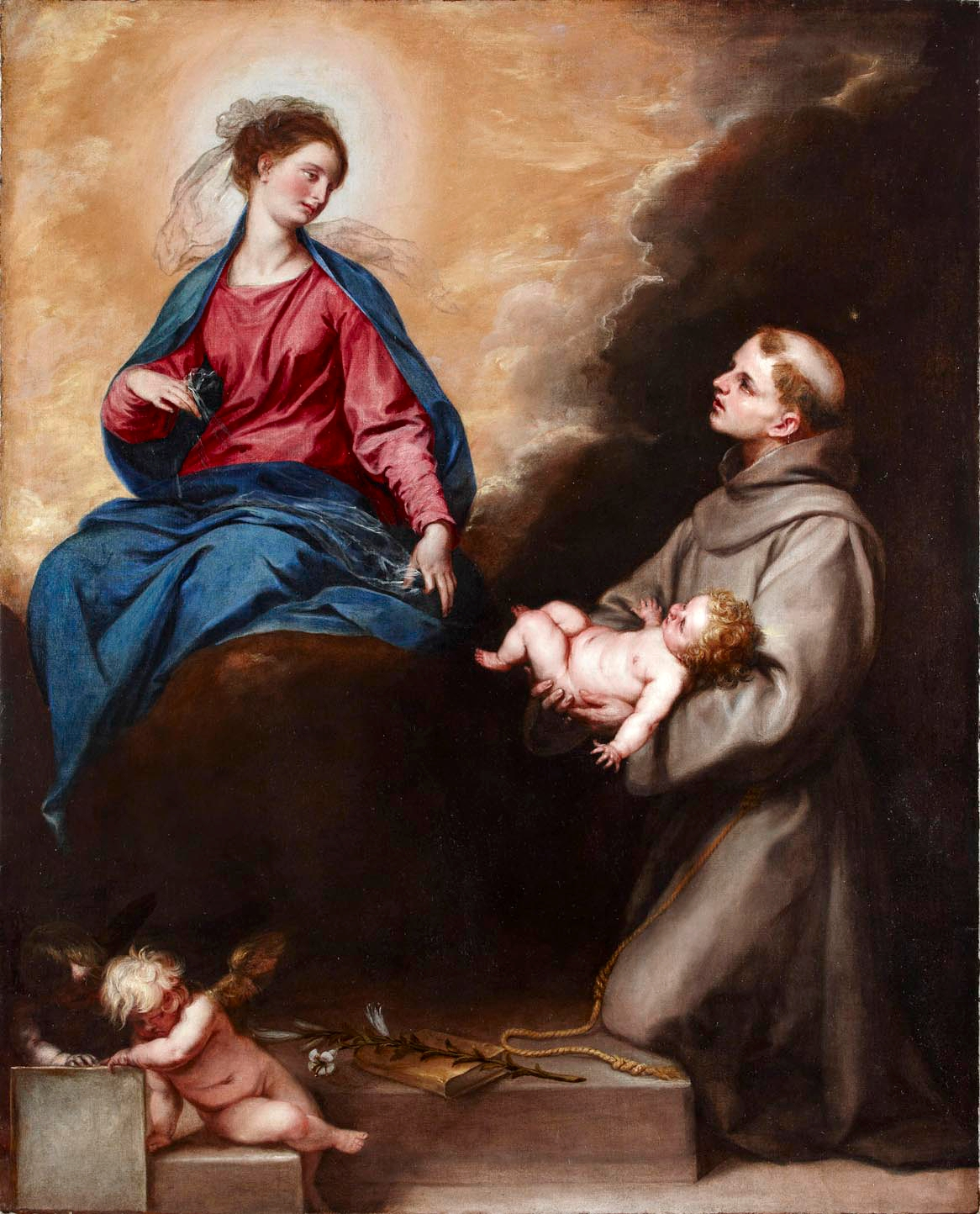
Vision of Saint Anthony, by Alonso Cano

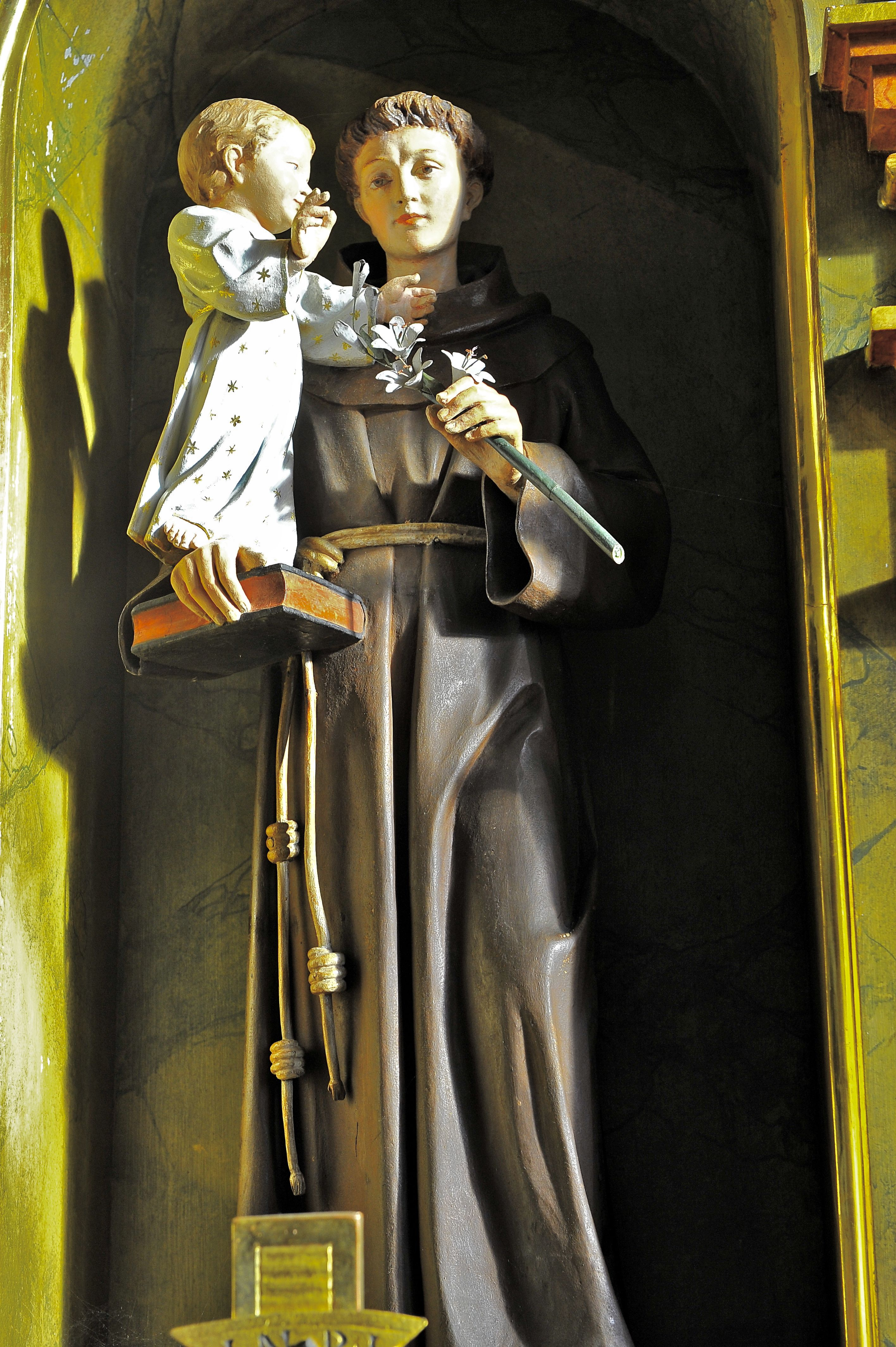
St. Antony with Christ Child, from, Carinthia, in Austria

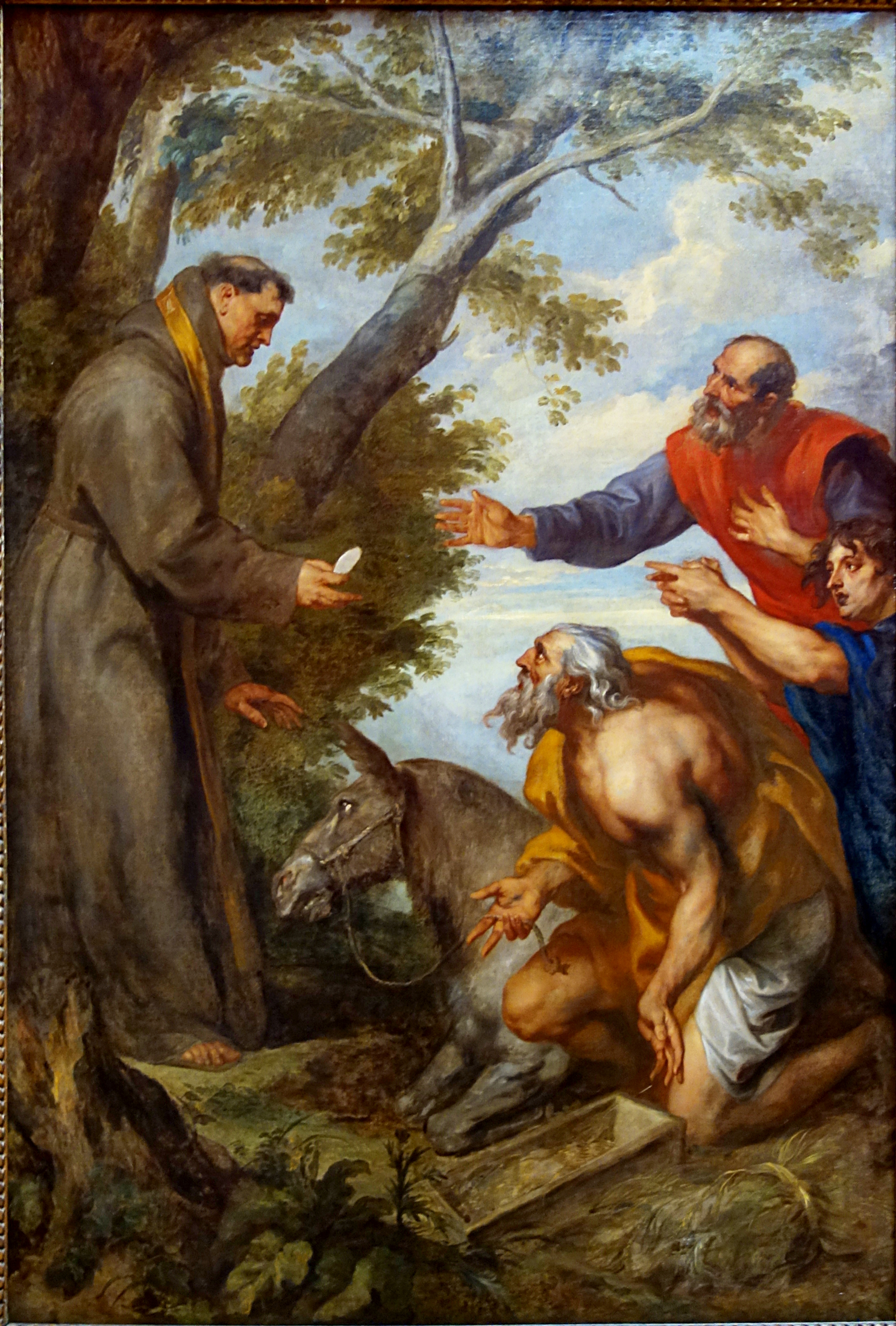
Saint Anthony of Padua and the miracle of the mule, by Anthony van Dyck.

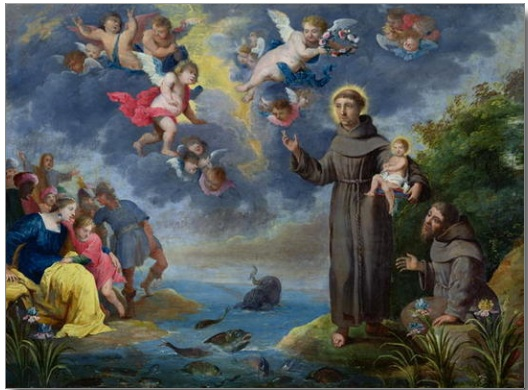
St. Anthony of Padua Preaching to the Fish, by Victor Wolfvoet II.

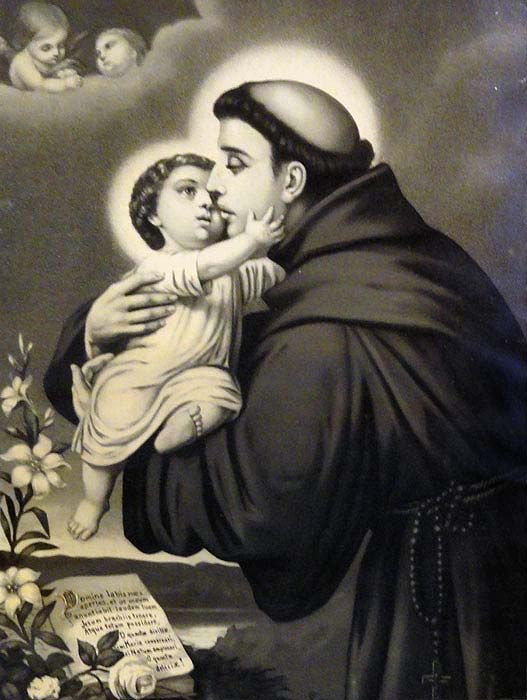
Devotional image of the apparition of the Child Jesus to Saint Anthony

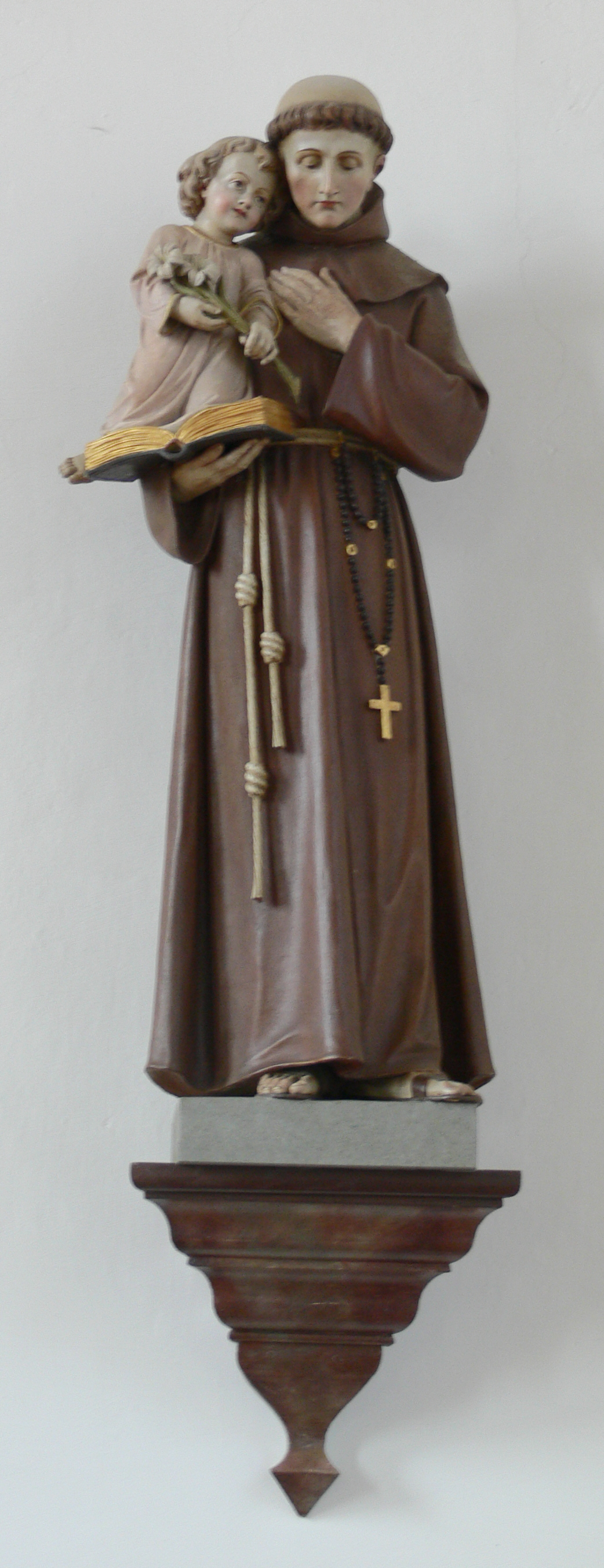
St Anthony holding Baby Jesus

=== In music ===
The Austrian composer Gustav Mahler's song cycle Des Knaben Wunderhorn contains the song Des Antonius von Padua Fischpredigt, whose lyrics recount the story of Saint Anthony's sermon to the fish. This song later formed the basis for the scherzo movement of Mahler's Symphony No. 2. In correspondence, Mahler expressed amusement that his sinuous musical setting could imply St. Anthony of Padua was himself drunk as he preached to the fish.

=== In films ===
- The 1931 silent film Saint Anthony of Padua (Antonio di Padova, il santo dei miracoli) was directed by Giulio Antamoro.
- He was played in the 1949 Italian film Anthony of Padua by Aldo Fiorelli.
- Punitha Anthoniyar (Saint Anthony), a 1977 Indian Tamil-language film directed by Nanjil Durai, starring R. Muthuraman and Lakshmi in the lead roles.
- Umberto Marino's 2002 Sant'Antonio di Padova or Saint Anthony: The Miracle Worker of Padua is an Italian TV movie about the saint. While the VHS format is without English subtitles, the DVD version released in 2005 is simply called Saint Anthony and is subtitled.
- Antonello Belluco's 2006 Antonio guerriero di Dio or Anthony, Warrior of God is a biopic about the saint.
- João Pedro Rodrigues directed the 2016 film The Ornithologist, a sort of modern-day fantastic allegory of the life of St. Anthony.

== See also ==
- Basilica of Saint Anthony of Padua
- Church of Saint Anthony of Lisbon
- Monument of Saint Anthony, Lisbon
- Catholic Church in Italy
- List of Catholic saints
- List of Latin nicknames of the Middle Ages: Doctors in theology
- Marian doctrines of St. Anthony
