= Tempietto of Sant'Antonio, Rimini =

Church in Rimini, Italy

Coordinates: 44°03′33″N 12°34′08″E

The Tempietto di Sant'Antonio is a small, octagonal temple or chapel dedicated to St Anthony of Padua, located in Piazza Tre Martiri of the city of Rimini, region of Emilia Romagna, Italy.

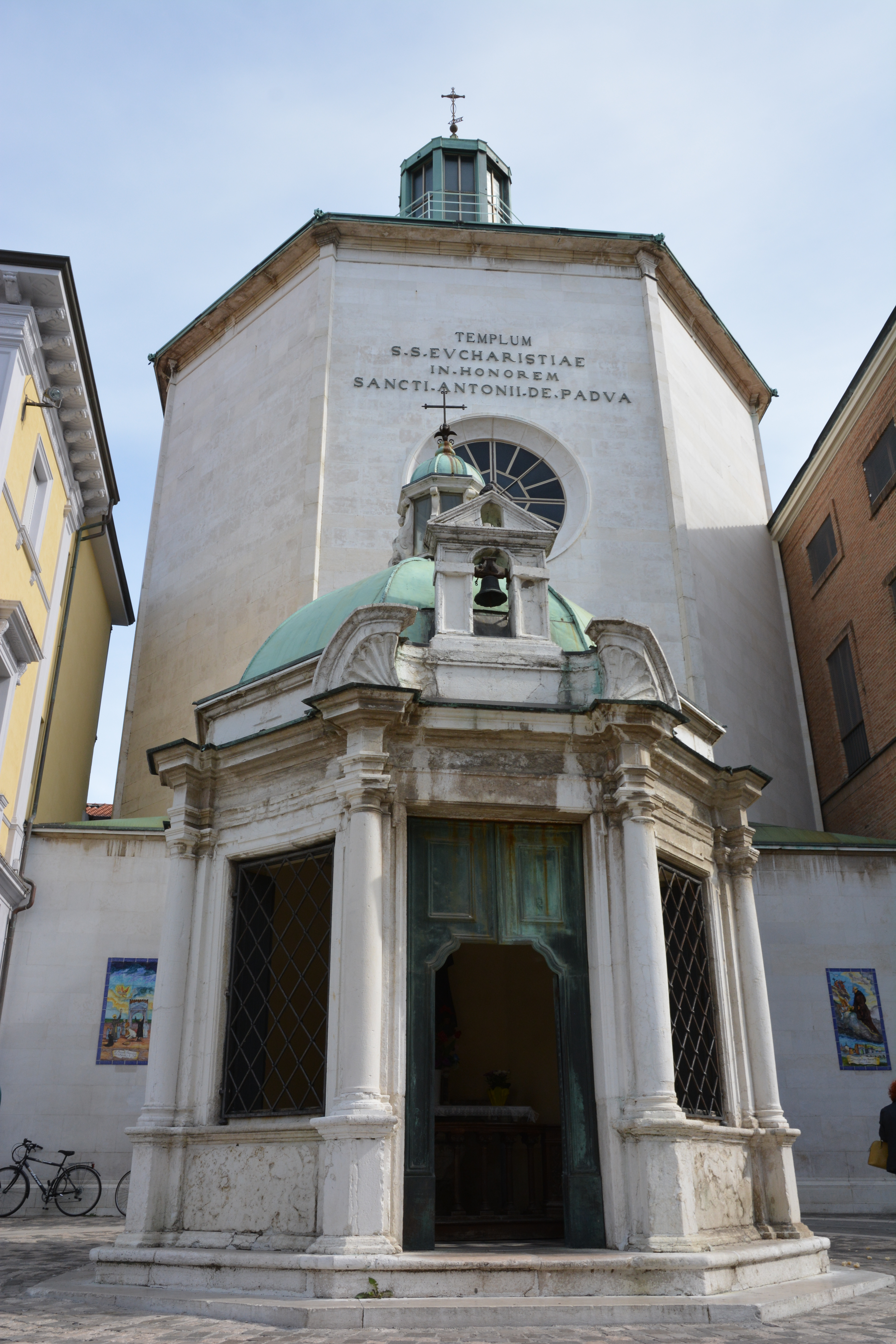
Tempietto in front of taller Sanctuary of Sant'Antonio

A structure was initially built here in 1518, commissioned by Pietro Ricciardelli. The chapel was rebuilt in the Baroque-style after the earthquake of 1672. Legend has the structure was constructed to honor a Eucharistic miracle at the site.

The legend, known also as the Miracle of the Mule, holds that, during the 13th century, St Anthony of Padua, after an impassioned public sermon, was distributing the blessed eucharist to faithful gathered in the piazza, when one citizen ignored him while walking along with his mule. The mule however miraculously and stubbornly sat itself prostrate in front of the saint.

Other stories recall the sermon had been against a Patarine heresiarch Bonvillo, who denied the nature of the Eucharist, and that the altar in the tempietto served to support the Saint while he delivered his Sermon. The church is adjacent to the church of San Francesco di Paola and is echoed by the larger Sanctuary of Sant'Antonio behind the Tempietto. St Anthony is also claimed to have performed a miracle in Rimini by preaching to fishes and having them congregate.
