= Saint Anthony of Padua holding the Infant Jesus =

Painting by Bernardo Strozzi

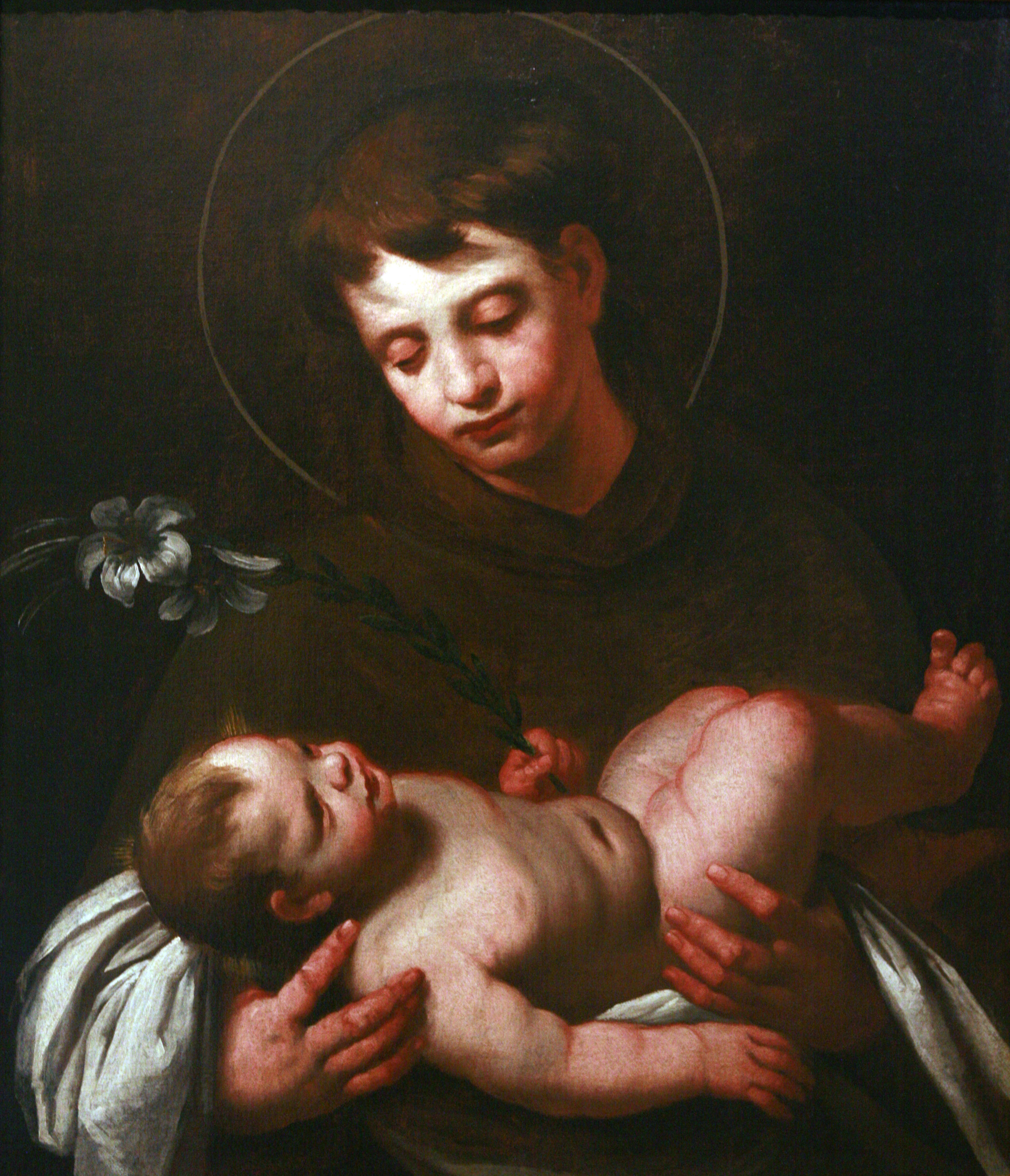
- Artist: Bernardo Strozzi
- Year: c. 1625
- Medium: oil paint on canvas
- Movement: Baroque painting Catholic art
- Subject: Anthony of Padua
- Dimensions: 83.5 cm × 71.5 cm (32.9 in × 28.1 in)
- Location: Musée des Beaux-Arts, Strasbourg
- Accession: 1994

Saint Anthony of Padua holding the Infant Jesus is a devotional painting by the Italian artist from Genoa, Bernardo Strozzi. It is stylistically dated from his middle period and was made around 1625 in his hometown. The painting was presented to the Musée des Beaux-Arts of Strasbourg, France, by the collectors Othon Kaufmann and François Schlageter in 1994. Its inventory number is 44.994.1.7.

According to the 2017 catalogue of the Italian paintings in the MBA Strasbourg, the painting has been overlooked by the most recent monographs about the painter (Luisa Mortari 1995, and Camillo Manzitti 2013), but it had been much admired and influential in the past. Ancient copies are found in the Museo Civico of Asolo, the Museo Civico of Cremona, a private collection in Rome, the church of Santa Maria Formosa in Venice, and the church of San Nicolò da Tolentino in the same city.
