= Church of Saint Anthony of Lisbon =

Roman Catholic church in Lisbon, Portugal

Coordinates: 38°42′36″N 9°08′01″W

- Main façade of the church

Religion
- Affiliation: Roman Catholic
- Diocese: Lisbon District
- Region: Lisboa Region
- Rite: Latin Rite

Location
- Location: Rua das Pedras Negras 1, 1100-401 Lisbon, Portugal
- Municipality: Lisbon
- Interactive map of Church of Saint Anthony of Lisbon

Architecture
- Style: Baroque, Rococo
- Groundbreaking: 1730
- Completed: 1767

The Church of Saint Anthony of Lisbon (Portuguese: Igreja de Santo António de Lisboa) is a Roman Catholic church located in Lisbon, Portugal. It is dedicated to Saint Anthony of Lisbon (also known in the Christian world as Saint Anthony of Padua). According to tradition, the church was built on the site where the saint was born, in 1195. The church is classified as a National Monument.

== History ==
Fernando de Bulhões (known as Saint Anthony) was born in Lisbon, Portugal, in 1195, the son of a wealthy family. In 1220, while studying in Coimbra, he entered the Franciscan Order, adopting the name António. His missionary travels would lead him to Italy, where he settled in Padua. Due to his immense popularity, he was canonised less than a year after his death, in 1232.

The site of the family house where Fernando was born, located very close to Lisbon Cathedral, was turned into a small chapel in the 15th century. This early building, from which nothing remains, was rebuilt in the early 16th century, during the reign of King Manuel I. The Lisbon Senate was located on a house just beside the chapel. A religious brotherhood (Irmandade de Santo António) dedicated to the saint was founded in the 16th century.

In 1730, under King John V, the church was rebuilt and redecorated. In the 1755 Lisbon earthquake the Santo António Church was destroyed, with only the main chapel left standing. It was fully rebuilt after 1767 to a Baroque-Rococo design by architect Mateus Vicente de Oliveira. This is the church that can be visited today.

Since 1755, a procession leaves the church every June 13, passes by Lisbon Cathedral, and goes through the slopes of Alfama neighbourhood, located nearby. The 13th of June is Saint Anthony's day and is one of the "Popular Saint Festivities" celebrated by Lisbon. During the morning, special bread is given to the oldest women of each family.

On May 12, 1982, Pope John Paul II visited the church. He inaugurated a statue of Saint Anthony (by sculptor Soares Branco) in the square in front of the church and prayed in the crypt, which marks the spot where the saint was born.

== Gallery ==
High altar

Nave looking toward the organ loft

Interior of the dome

Sacristy with azulejos

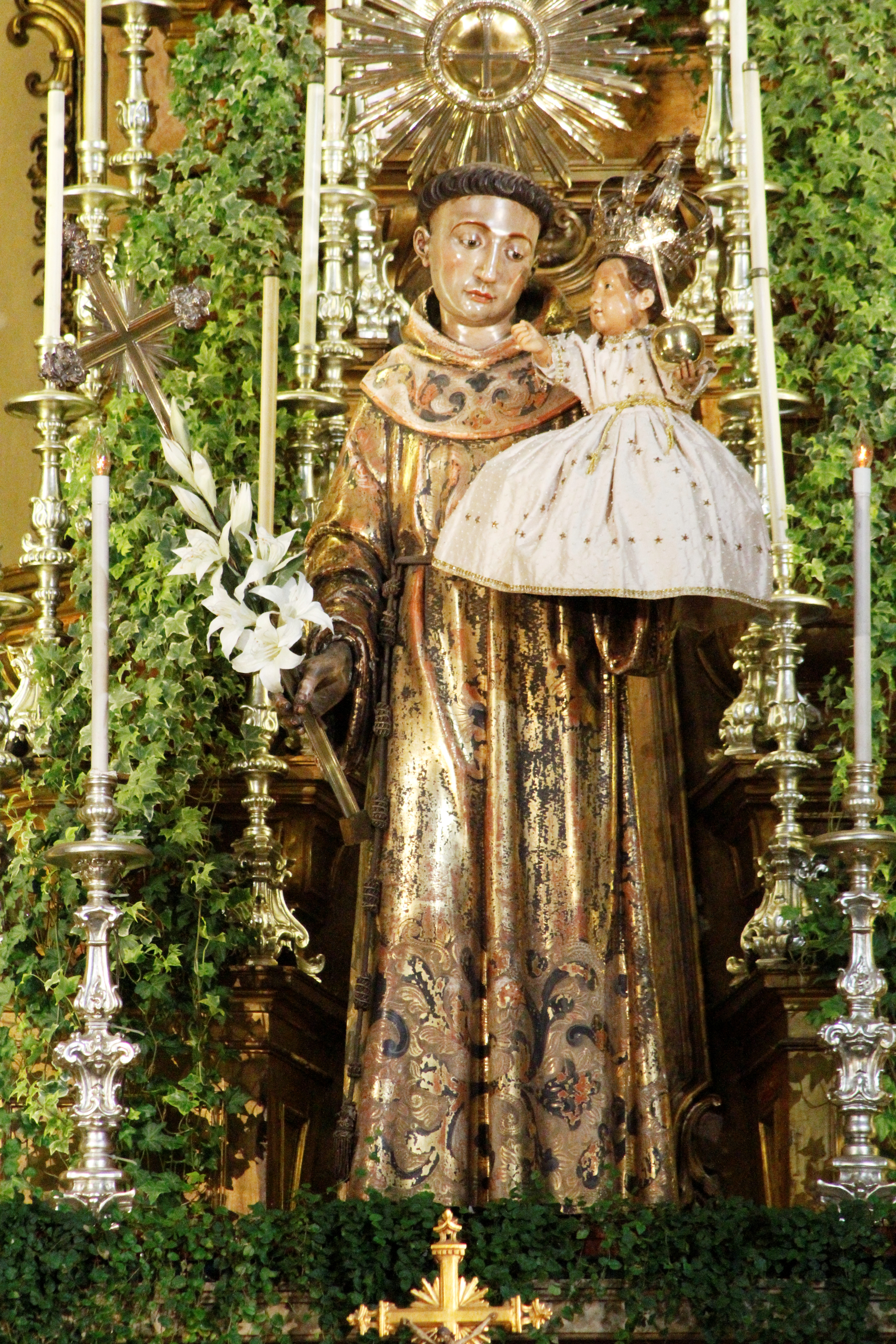
Statue of Saint Anthony

== See also ==
- Catholicism in Portugal
