= Victor Wolfvoet (II) =

Flemish painter and art dealer

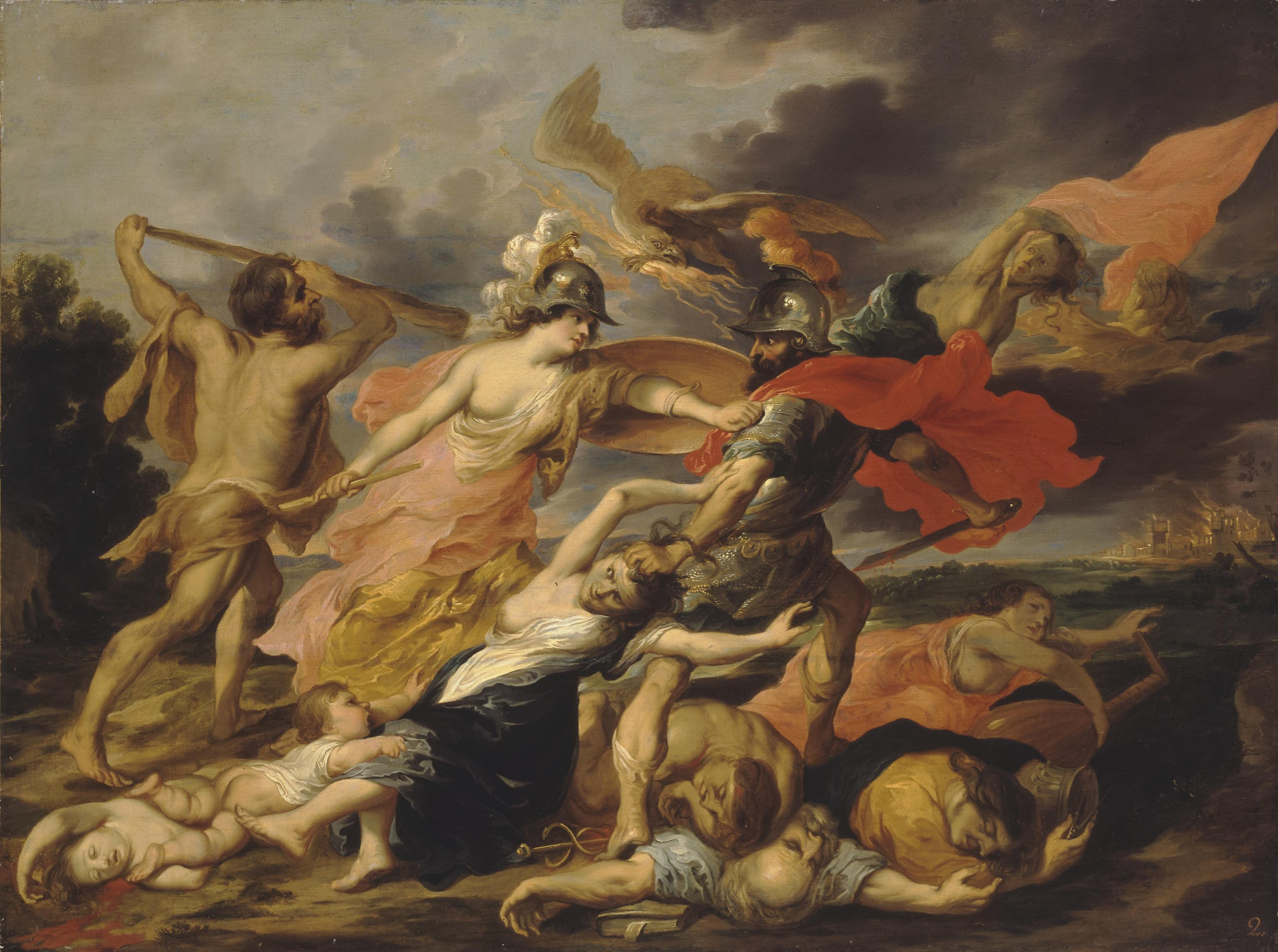
Hercules and Minerva Expelling Mars

Victor Wolfvoet (II) or Victor Wolfvoet the Younger (1612 – 1652), was a Flemish art dealer and painter of history and allegorical paintings. His artistic output was heavily influenced by Peter Paul Rubens.

== Life ==
Victor Wolfvoet the Younger was born in Antwerp as the son of Victor Wolfvoet the Elder, a painter and art dealer, and Brigitta Voorwercx. His father was most likely his teacher. He became a member of the Antwerp Guild of Saint Luke around 1644–5. Some sources refer to Wolfvoet as a pupil of Rubens.

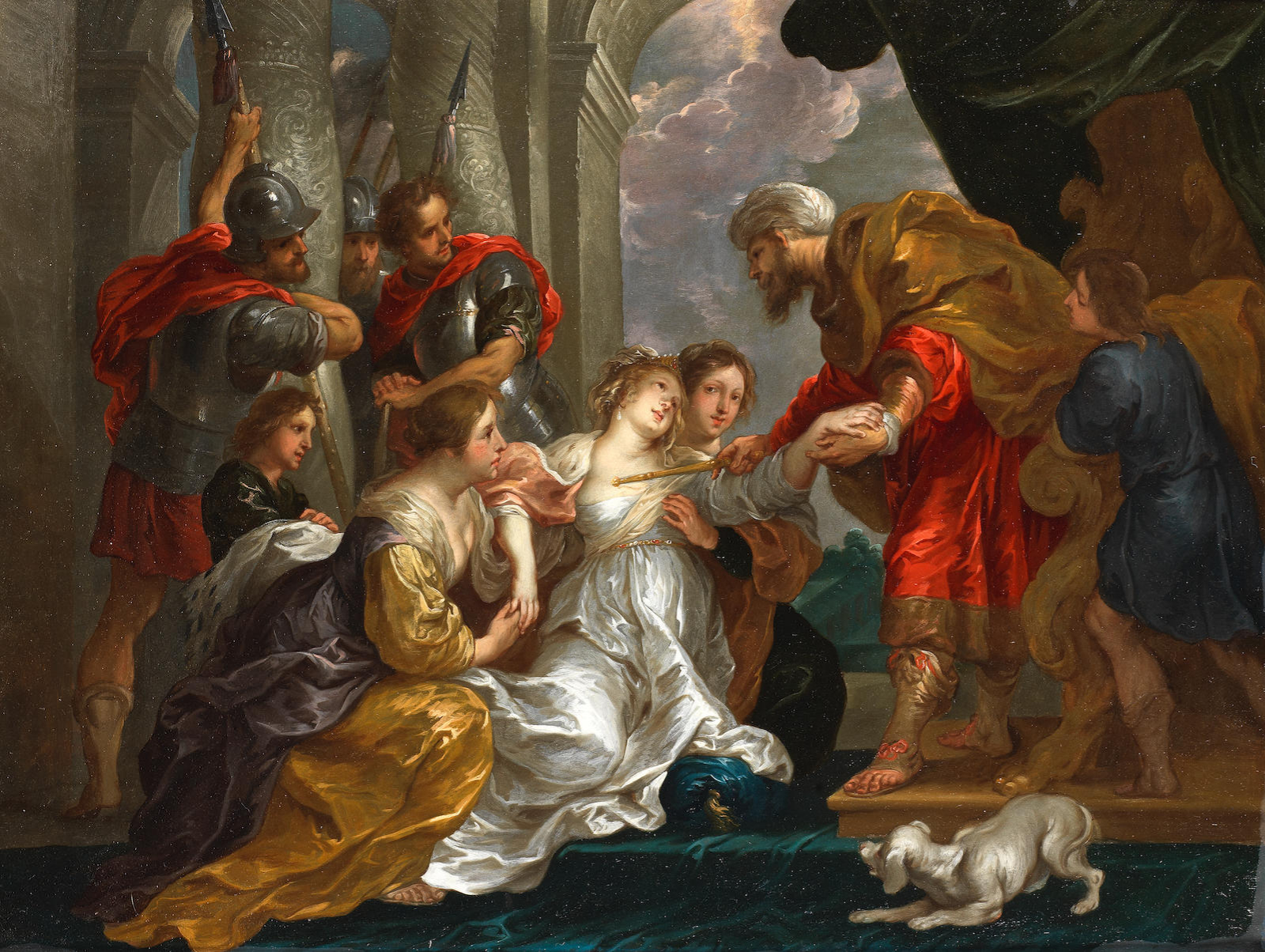
Esther before Ahasuerus

He married in 1636. His 1652 will, which he made not long before his death, states that he was the widower of Elisabeth Mertens. Victor Wolfvoet died in Antwerp on 23 October 1652 leaving one daughter, Livina Wolfvoet.

The artist's estate comprised a substantial collection of artworks of seven hundred items. The inventory of his estate lists twenty sketches by Rubens, including several designs for the ceilings of the Carolus Borromeus Church in Antwerp and six bozzetti for the Triumph of the Eucharist tapestry series. There are also sketches by other artists, many unattributed sketches and framed grisailles, and several sketches after Rubens. Some of the sketches were likely in Wolfvoet's hand, like his copies after Rubens' Abraham and Melchizedek and Manna from Heaven both now in the Mauritshuis, The Hague. The large collection of works has been regarded as evidence that the artist may also have been active as an art dealer.

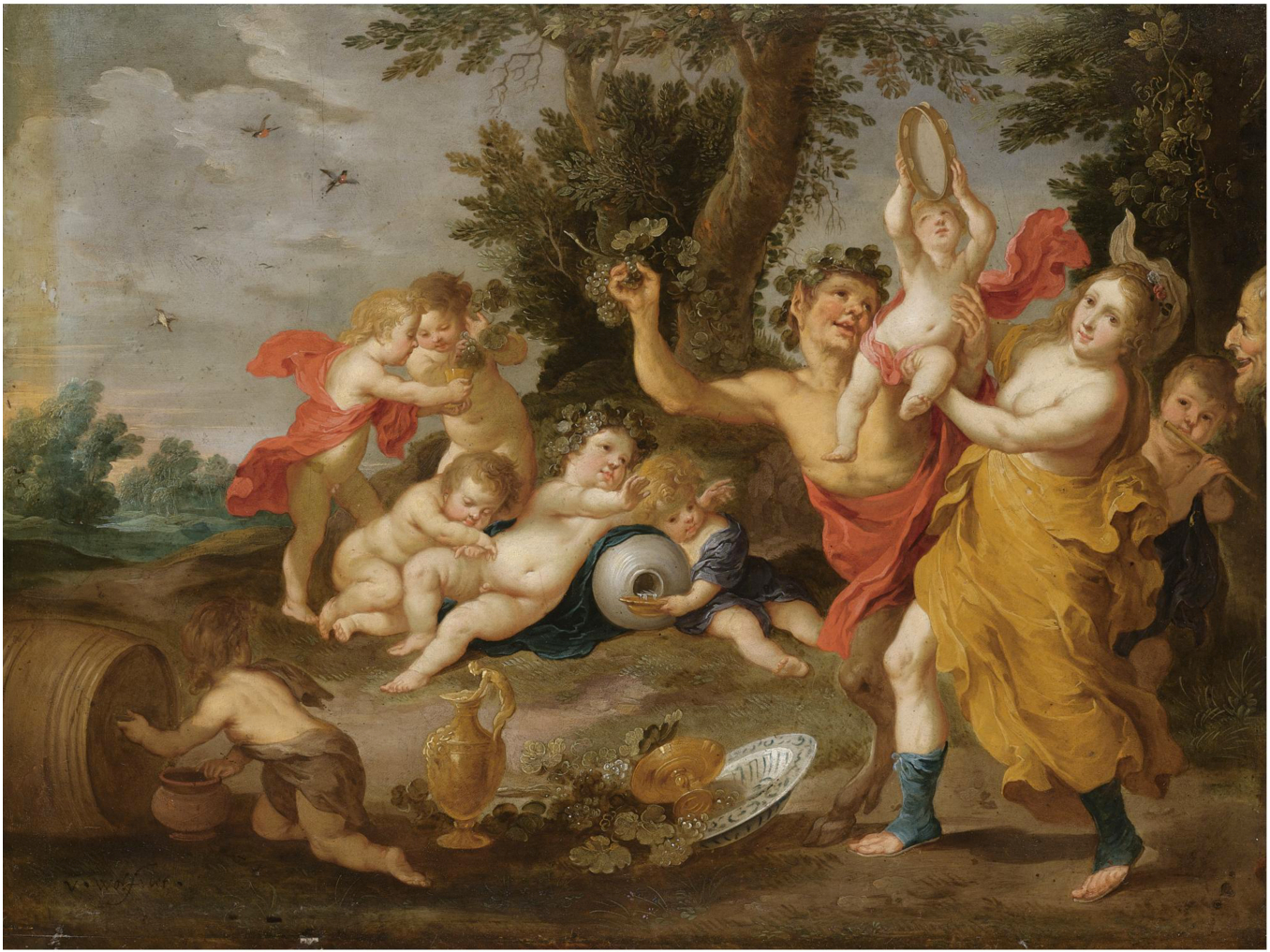
A Bacchanal

== Work ==
Wolfvoet was active as an art dealer, became an artist rather late in life, and died relatively young. This explains his fairly limited output. As his work has recently received more academic attention his known oeuvre has expanded thanks to new attributions to Wolfvoet of work formerly attributed to other artists such as Erasmus Quellinus II, Guillam Forchondt, and Willem van Herp and anonymous Rubens followers.

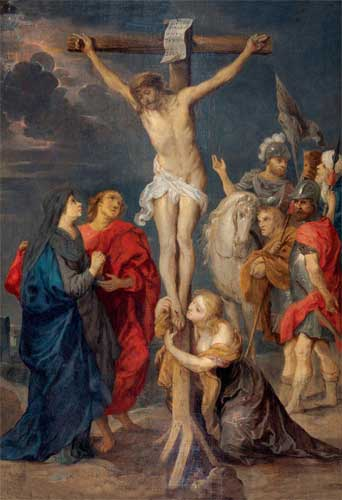
Calvary

Although there is no evidence that Wolfvoet studied under Rubens, he is considered one of the most faithful followers of that artist. He often used paintings, preparatory drawings, or oil sketches by Rubens as the model for his paintings. He had access to some of these through his art business and public sales of Rubens' work in the Antwerp market. Examples are two copper paintings relating to the theme of the War between War and Peace (private collections) and an oil on canvas of Hercules and Minerva Expelling Mars (Hermitage Museum) (of which there also exists a copy on copper). In the first two copper paintings, he used a palette similar to that of Rubens and achieved a harmony of tone with space, which he had learned from Rubens.

He was inspired by other artists such as Frans Francken the Younger whose versions of the Worship of the Golden Calf he used as a basis for his version of this theme (in the Museo Nacional de San Carlos). Wolfvoet copied the color of Franken's versions but added figures and intensified the shadows on the objects and persons.

A significant portion of the output of Wolfvoet consists of relatively small-scale paintings on copper. This medium was preferred for paintings made for the export market, in particular to Spain and the Spanish South American colonies where the copper support was highly prized both for durability and its glossy finish.

== Bibliography ==
- Jahel Sanzsalazar, « In the Shadow of Rubens. Victor Wolfvoet the Younger (1612–1652), Emulation, Style, and the Rediscovery of 35 Works », Bulletin de l’Institut royal du Patrimoine artistique / Bulletin van het Koninklijk Instituut voor het Kunstpatrimonium [En ligne], 42 | 2026. URL : http://journals.openedition.org/kikirpa/18156 ; DOI : https://doi.org/10.4000/16v5q
