= Lurago =

Lurago may refer to:

== Geography ==
- Lurago d'Erba, Italian municipality
- Lurago Marinone, Italian municipality

== People ==
- Carlo Lurago, Italian architect
- Rocco Lurago, Italian architect
