= Cervara Altarpiece =

Panel paintings by Gerard David

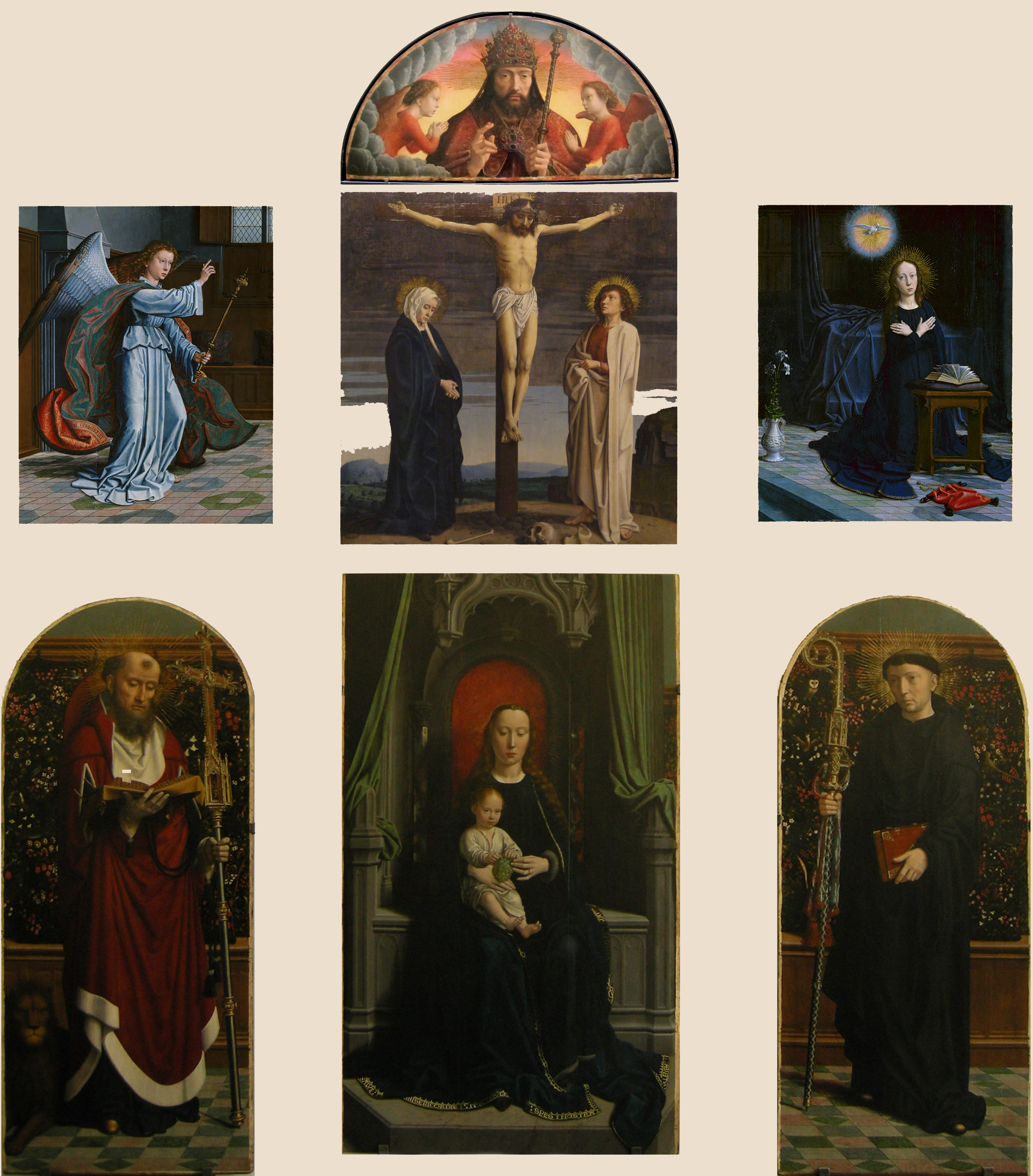
- Virtual reconstruction of the altarpiece
- Artist: Gerard David
- Year: 1507
- Medium: oil on oak panel
- Dimensions: 153 cm × 89 cm (60 in × 35 in)
- Location: Palazzo Bianco, Metropolitan Museum of Art, Musée du Louvre, Genoa, New York City, Paris.

The Cervara Altarpiece or Cervara Polyptych was an oil-on-oak-panel altarpiece painted by the Flemish painter Gerard David early in the 16th century for the high altar of Cervara Abbey in Liguria, Italy.

== History ==
It was commissioned by the Genoese nobleman Vincenzo Sauli on 7 September 1506, as dated in a 17th-century document - Sauli's name is painted above the Virgin's feet in the central panel. David painted it in Bruges and it was installed in the Abbey in 1507.

== Description ==
It was originally formed of seven panels, which were divided up after the monastery's suppression and requisition in 1797 by the Republic of Genoa. The separated panels were initially deposited in the Palais Ducal, seat of the prefecture, and only four panels remained in Genoa. These four were the central one (measuring 153 by 89 cm and showing the Madonna and Child Enthroned or the Madonna of the Grapes), two side panels (each measuring 152.5 by 64 cm and showing saint Jerome and saint Maurus) and an upper central panel (measuring 102 by 88 cm and showing the Crucifixion).

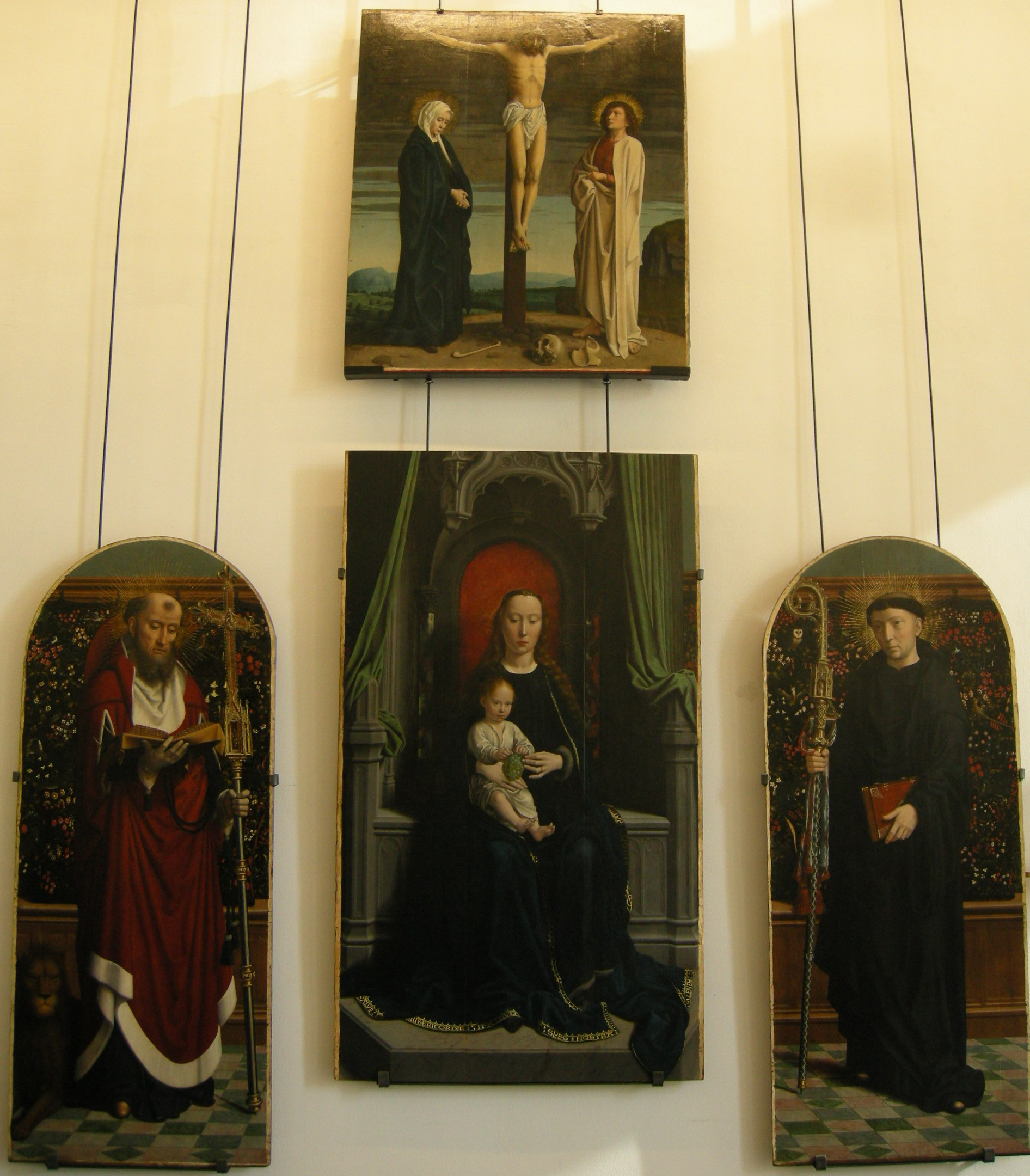
Panels in the Palazzo Bianco.

The central Virgin and Child and the upper Crucifixion panels were rediscovered in the Palazzo Ducale in 1805. In 1830 the painter Francesco Baratta the elder supervised their transfer to the mayor's office in the Palazzo Tursi, the civic palazzo, and later into the Palazzo Bianco gallery. The altarpiece's three remaining panels were later rediscovered in Italy. Two of these were the two upper side panels of the Annunciation, now in the Metropolitan Museum of Art in New York, with one showing the angel and one the Virgin. A final semicircular panel from above the Crucifixion is now in the Louvre Museum in Paris - this shows God the Father with his hand raised in blessing, surrounded by angels. All seven panels were re-united at the Palazzo Bianco in autumn 2005.
