= Rocco Lurago =

Rocco Lurago (died 1590) was an Italian architect, active in Genoa in the 16th century.

== Biography ==
Rocco Lurago was born in Pelsopra, and moved to Genoa as a young man. He came from a family of stone masons and architects: his brother, Giovanni Lurago, was a prominent architect. Rocco rented space in one of Giovanni’s workshops in 1558. Between 1567 and 1571 he was commissioned to work on stone carvings on the façade of Santa Croce di Bosco Marengo in Piedmont, where he played a minor role under the architects Ignazio Danti and Martino Longhi the elder. By 1571 he was referred to as a master stone-carver.

Rocco’s major Genoese commission was his carving (1583) with Giovanni Pietro Orsolino of the Doric columns and balustrades for the seaward loggia of Giovanni Andrea Doria’s villa in Fassolo after designs by Giovanni Ponzello and Giuseppe Forlano. He designed the Palazzo Doria-Tursi, adjacent to the Palazzo Bianco which now belongs to the city. He designed the Dominican monastery in Bosco Marengo for Pope Pius V. Francesco da Novi was his pupil.

== Sources ==
- Milizia, Francesco (1797). Dizionario delle Belle Arti del Disegno y Estratto in Gran Parte dalla Enciclopedia Metodica da Francesco Milizia, Seconda Edizione, Tomo Secondo. Bassano, Italy. p. 53.
- Boni, Filippo de' (1852). Biografia degli artisti ovvero dizionario della vita and delle opere dei pittori, degli scultori, degli intagliatori, dei tipografi and dei musici di ogni nazione che fiorirono da'tempi più remoti sino á nostri giorni. Seconda Edizione. Venice; Googlebooks: Presso Andrea Santini and Figlio. p. 590.
