= History of Tursi =

History of the Italian municipality

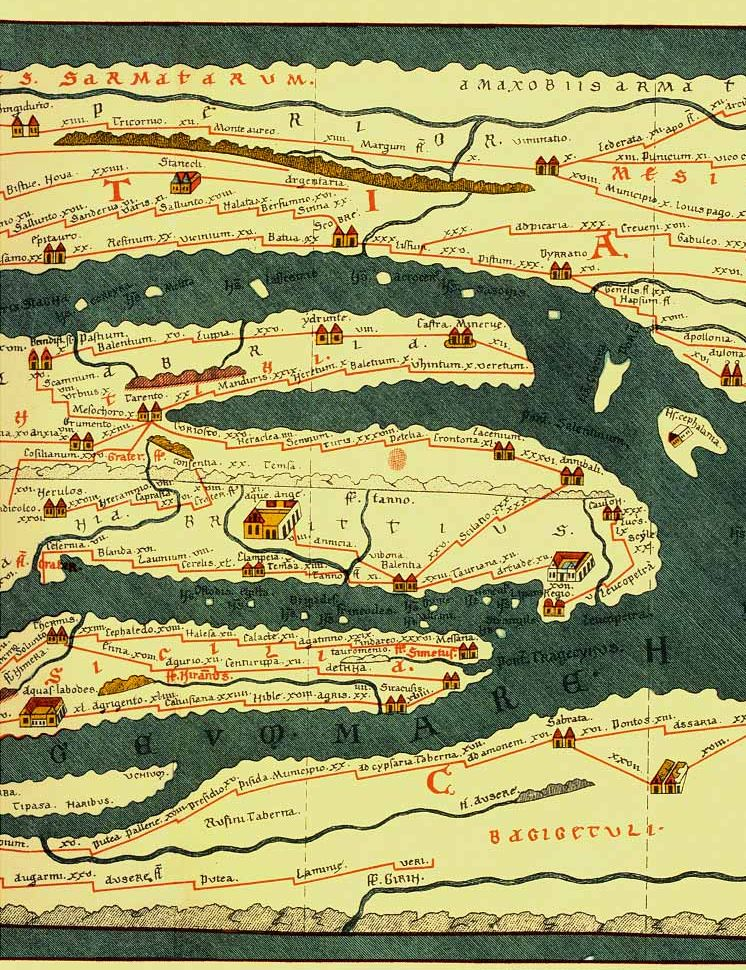
Tabula Peutingeriana of southern Italy

The history of Tursi, a town in southern Italy, likely originated in the early Middle Ages with the fifth-century barbarian invasions by the Goths.

The historian Placido Troyli said the city originated from the decay of Pandosia, François Lenormant, an Assyriologist, said it was the ancient Roman Turiostum of the Tabula Peutingeriana, the historian Antonio Nigro said it was founded by the Goths of Odoacer towards the end of the 5th century, and Lorenzo Giustiniani states it was founded by the Saracens in the 9th century. The archaeologist Lorenzo Quilici also said the latter, and that Arab pressure in the Agri Valley culminated with the conquest of Grumento, Stigliano, and the founding of Castelsaraceno, around the year 872.

All of them agreed on the Gothic construction of the castle in the early 5th century and the later Saracen rule, and said the present-day Rabatana town center was the latter. In the hilly area of Murata, adjacent to the castle, many tombs, without any grave goods, covered by huge slabs, have been found, indicating the area was already inhabited prior to the construction of the castle, and Giacomo Racioppi said that there was already an oppidum (Roman town) in the area.

The territory was inhabited from the early Iron Age by the Oenotrians to whom Pandosia attributed the founding, and renamed by the Ionians during the Hellenic colonization of Italy.

== Origin of the name ==
Many historians have said that the toponym Tursi derives from Turcico, a man-at-arms of Byzantine origin, commander of the area, who expanded downstream the ancient Saracen village, Rabatana, giving the new area the name Toursicon, Tursikon or Tursicon, which later, with French pronunciation under Norman rule, became first Tursico, then Tursio and finally Tursi. The toponym Turcico, comes from the Byzantine era and probably to the restoration of the city, implemented by Nikephoros Phokas the Elder after 885; the slings found near the castle confirm this reconquest.

1. Other sources state that the name derives from Turris, making clear reference to the original Gothic castle tower.

Giacomo Racioppi said the toponym came from the Greek tύρσìς, πύργος, tower, referring to a summit tower, perhaps the one perpetuated by the central tower of the castle, which effectively dominated the vastness below.

Racioppi said it was probably derived from Turcia, which came from Torcia or Torsia, "embankment to hold back the winter floods."

Racioppi said a popular etymology, says Tursi derives from Turks, probably in confusion with the first Arab and then Byzantine memory of Rabatana.

Mario Cosmai, among other etymological proposals, said it was a possible derivative of Turseni or Tirreni.

Giovanni Alessio also said it might come from Turcius.

According to the French Assyriologist François Lenormant, the name is from the Latin Turiostum.

In 1154, the Arab geographer Muhammad al-Idrisi during the making of the Tabula Rogeriana on behalf of Roger II of Sicily, in his Kitab nuzhat al-mushtaq fi'khtiraq al-'afaq, known as the book of King Roger, called the city by the toponym of Tursah.

The first documented mention is from 968, when the city is called "Turcico" and "Tower of Turcico," in the Relatio de legatione Constantinopolitana of Bishop Liutprand of Cremona. Later, in the Norman era, the name “Turcico” changed first to “Tursico” and then to “Tursio,” and in the papal bull drafted by Pope Alexander II in 1068 the town is called "Tower of Tursio," until it later attained its later babe "Tursi."

== The Iron Age ==
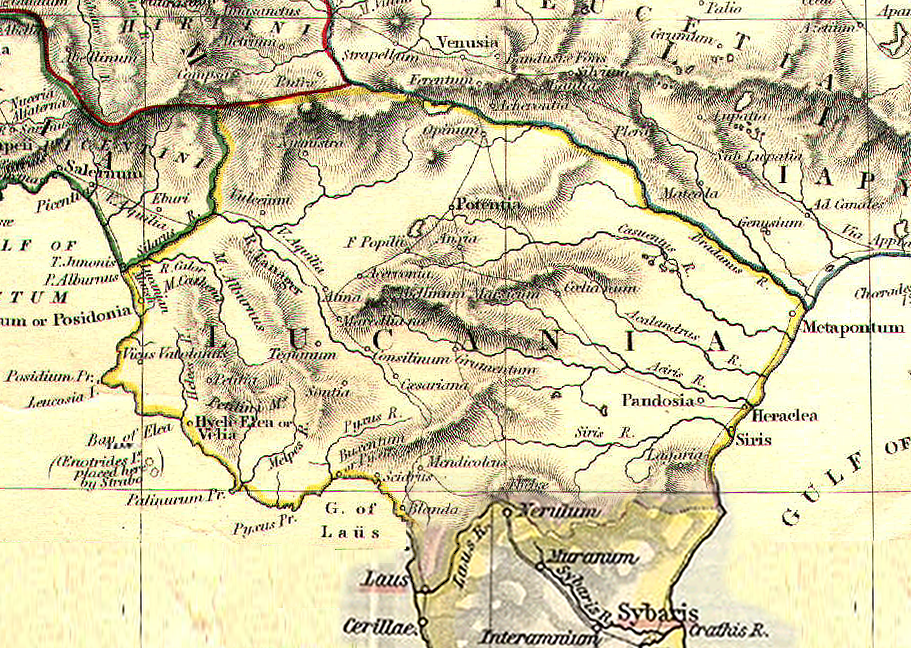
The historical region of Lucania.

Archaeological excavations carried out in the municipal territory, more precisely, around Anglona and nearby Policoro, have unearthed countless items currently housed in the National Archaeological Museum of the Siritide, ascertaining the existence of settlements dating back to the early Iron Age. As of the 15th century B.C., the inhabitants of these areas were called Oenotrians, but in particular, the inhabitants settled around the Agri and Sinni rivers were called Coni or Choni.

Later, around the 8th century BC, several colonies were founded on the Ionian coast by Greeks from Ionia, including Siris, Heraclea, Metaponto and Pandosia. Siris is believed to have been founded in the early seventh century B.C. by the peoples of Epirus, destroyed by Metaponto, Sibari and Crotone in the sixth century B.C., and from its ruins rose Heraclea between 443 B.C. and 430 B.C. In the ninth century the city is mentioned under the name Polychorium, and in 1126 in a deed of gift to the monastery of Carbone, the present name Policoro appears.

Pandosia, which bordered Heraclea, is considered the oldest city in the Siritide, in fact, Antonini basing himself on passages from the Genealogy of Pherecydes of Athens and passages from the Ancient History of Rome by Dionysius of Halicarnassus, speculates that Pandosia was founded by Oenotrus, one of the 23 sons of Lycaon, many centuries before Rome, and that he ruled over the whole eastern part of Lucania. It was very rich and important because of the fertile soil and strategic location. The two large Lucanian rivers, the Agri and the Sinni, which were navigable at that time, and the ancient Via Herculea, which ran from Heraclea up the Agri valley for more than 60 km to the Roman city of Grumentum, facilitated communications and thus favored a rapid expansion of the city. Romanelli, relying on findings from the Heraclean Tablets and Pliny the Elder's Naturalis Historia, asserts that the Pandosia of Lucania is the place where Alexander Molossus, king of Epirus and maternal uncle of Alexander the Great, lost his life in 330 B.C. in a battle against the Lucanians. In 281 B.C. it was a battlefield between the Romans and Pyrrhus, king of Epirus, who ran to the aid of the Tarentines and camped between Heraclea and Pandosia. This battle went down in history mainly because of the use of war elephants, still unknown to the soldiers of the Roman Republic. It was thanks to this unit that Pyrrhus won the battle of Heraclea, however, taking a very high number of casualties, and it was from this circumstance that the expression “Pyrrhic victory” was born. In 214 B.C. it was the scene of yet another battle in the course of the Second Punic War between the Romans and Hannibal, king of the Carthaginians, to gain dominance over the Mediterranean.

Pandosia was destroyed between 81 B.C. and 72 B.C. during the Social Wars led by the Roman general Lucius Cornelius Sulla. From the ruins of Pandosia arose, shortly before the Christian era, Anglona (Anglonum).

== The Middle Ages ==
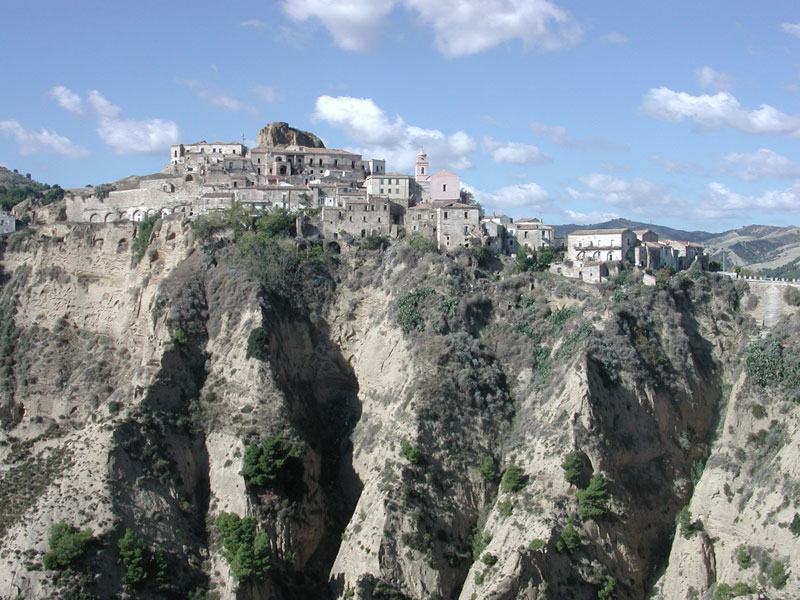
Panorama of the historic center, Rabatana district.

In 410 the Visigoths of Alaric I sacked and half-destroyed Anglona. To control the surrounding territory they built a castle on a hill halfway between the Agri and Sinni rivers. The surviving inhabitants of the town of Anglona took refuge around the castle, giving rise to Rabatana, Tursi's first populated village.

In the ninth century, around 826 to be precise, at the height of the Islamic campaign, there were numerous violent Arab raids throughout southern Italy. Their armies from North Africa were predominantly of Saracen origin. Initially these raids were intended to plunder villages and take prisoners to be used as slaves in the centers of the Islamic empire. Later, having overcome the initial religious and cultural differences with the native populations, the invaders around 850 conquered much of the Metapontine plain and decided to quarter themselves in dominant and strategic areas, to better control trade within the territory. Since they were expert dry-crop farmers and skilled artisans, the Saracens quickly managed to weave peaceful relationships with the local inhabitants. The flourishing exchange made possible the development of small military garrisons (ribāṭ) into full-fledged residential quarters called rabatane, the most important of which still include those of Tursi, Tricarico and Pietrapertosa. In later years, the Saracens inhabited the village, enlarged it and they were the ones who gave it its name, in memory of their Arab village Rabhàdi. The Saracen influence is still present today in the buildings, customs, food and dialect of Rabatana.

In 890 the Byzantines reconquered the territories that once belonged to the Western Roman Empire and succeeded, during the Arab-Byzantine wars, in finally driving out the Arab influence from the Lucanian lands as well. During the years of Byzantine rule, the center experienced both demographic and building development, and the village began to extend toward the valley below. The entire center took the name Toursikon, after its founder Turcico.

Toward the end of the 10th century, Emperor Basil I first formed the theme of Longobardia and the theme of Calabria and later, in 968 the theme of Lucania with Toursikon as its capital, thus completing the Hellenization plan of the Catepanate church. In fact, in his Relatio de legatione Constantinopolitana, written in the same year, Liutprand of Cremona reports that at that time Patriarch Polyeuctus of Constantinople received from Emperor Nikephoros Phokas the authorization to erect the metropolitan see of Otranto, giving Metropolitan Peter the authority to consecrate the suffragan bishops of Acerenza, Tursi, Gravina, Matera and Tricarico. It is unclear, however, whether these provisions had any real effect, since the Notitiae Episcopatuum of the patriarchate of Constantinople mentions only one suffragan see of Otranto, namely the one of Tursi, while the other dioceses mentioned by Liutprand likely continued to gravitate to the area of Latin influence.

Tursi thus became the seat of the Greek-rite diocese with an episcopal chair at the church of St. Michael the Archangel where the synod of bishops was held in 1060. The first known bishop of Tursi is the Greek Michael, documented in a testamentary act of 1050.

Later, towards the end of the year 1000, a large migration of Normans, in the guise of pilgrims heading to holy places of Christianity and in the guise of mercenaries ready to fight for a piece of land, arrived in southern Italy. They easily inserted themselves into the internal struggles between the Lombards and Byzantines, soon gaining land and benefits. The Normans contributed greatly to the city's growth, just as the Swabians did first and then the Angevins.

=== Tursi, seat of the diocese ===
In 968 the bishopric was established in Tursi (Tursiensis), and until the early 12th century the diocese adopted the Byzantine rite. The first known bishop of Tursi is the Greek Michael, documented in a testamentary act of 1050. With the second half of the 11th century, concurrently with the passage of the territory into Norman hands, the diocese was included in the Latin ecclesiastical organization. In the bull granted by Pope Alexander II in 1068 to Arnaldo of Acerenza, Tursi is listed among the suffragans of the new metropolitan see of Acerenza.

Between the 11th and 12th centuries, in the context of a reconsolidation of ecclesiastical arrangements in the region, the bishopric was transferred to Anglona, a few kilometers from Tursi. The first known bishop with the title Anglonensis is Peter, mentioned in a diploma of 1110.

During the 12th century, both ecclesiastical and civil official acts alternated between the titles Anglonensis and Tursiensis. In 1121 a certain Giovanni, bishop of Tursi, is attested, while in 1144 and 1146 the same bishop, or a namesake, is documented as bishop of Anglona. In papal acts directed to the metropolitans of Acerenza from Paschal II (1099-1118) to Innocent III (1198-1216) the name of Tursi recurs, while in royal diplomas of 1167 and 1221 the ecclesia Anglonensis appears. Some authors have hypothesized the coexistence for a certain period of two bishops, the Greek one in Tursi and the Latin one in Anglona, a hypothesis that, however, appears controversial and not unanimously shared. However, it seems that Anglona maintained a secondary role with respect to Tursi, and in fact in 1219 the settlement is qualified as a castrum and not a civitas, while in 1221 it is referred to as a “casale,” an indication of a progressive depopulation of the territory. In 1320, according to Ughelli's reports, the cathedral chapter was operating in Tursi, while the bishops also soon abandoned the town of Anglona, which was set on fire in 1369, to take refuge in Chiaromonte. With the decadence of the city of Anglona and the development of Tursi, Pope Paul III, in order to settle the disputes between the chancery and the baronial chamber, with the consistory decree of August 8, 1545, directed to Bishop Berardino Elvino, sanctioned the transfer of the bishopric of Anglona to the city of Tursi. The seat of the cathedra was the church of St. Michael the Archangel; eight months later, the same Pontiff, with the bull of March 26, 1546, definitively transferred the episcopal chair to Tursi, in the church of the Annunziata, and ordered the bishops to keep the title of the diocese of Anglona-Tursi.

On September 8, 1976, following the creation of the Basilicata Ecclesiastical Region it assumed the name of the diocese of Tursi-Lagonegro. Anglona, however, became titular see of a diocese. Its first titular bishop from 1977 to 1991 was Andrea Cordero Lanza di Montezemolo who later became a cardinal.

The diocese has 82 parishes and an area of 2,509 km². In 2014 it had 127,100 baptized people out of a population of 128,200, accounting for 99.1 percent of the total population.

==== Chronotaxis of the Greek-rite bishops of Tursi ====
- Michael † (mentioned in 1050)
- Enghelberto (or Inghilberto) † (before 1065 - after 1068)
- Leone † (? - ?)
- Simeone † (before 1074 - after 1102)

== The Modern Age ==
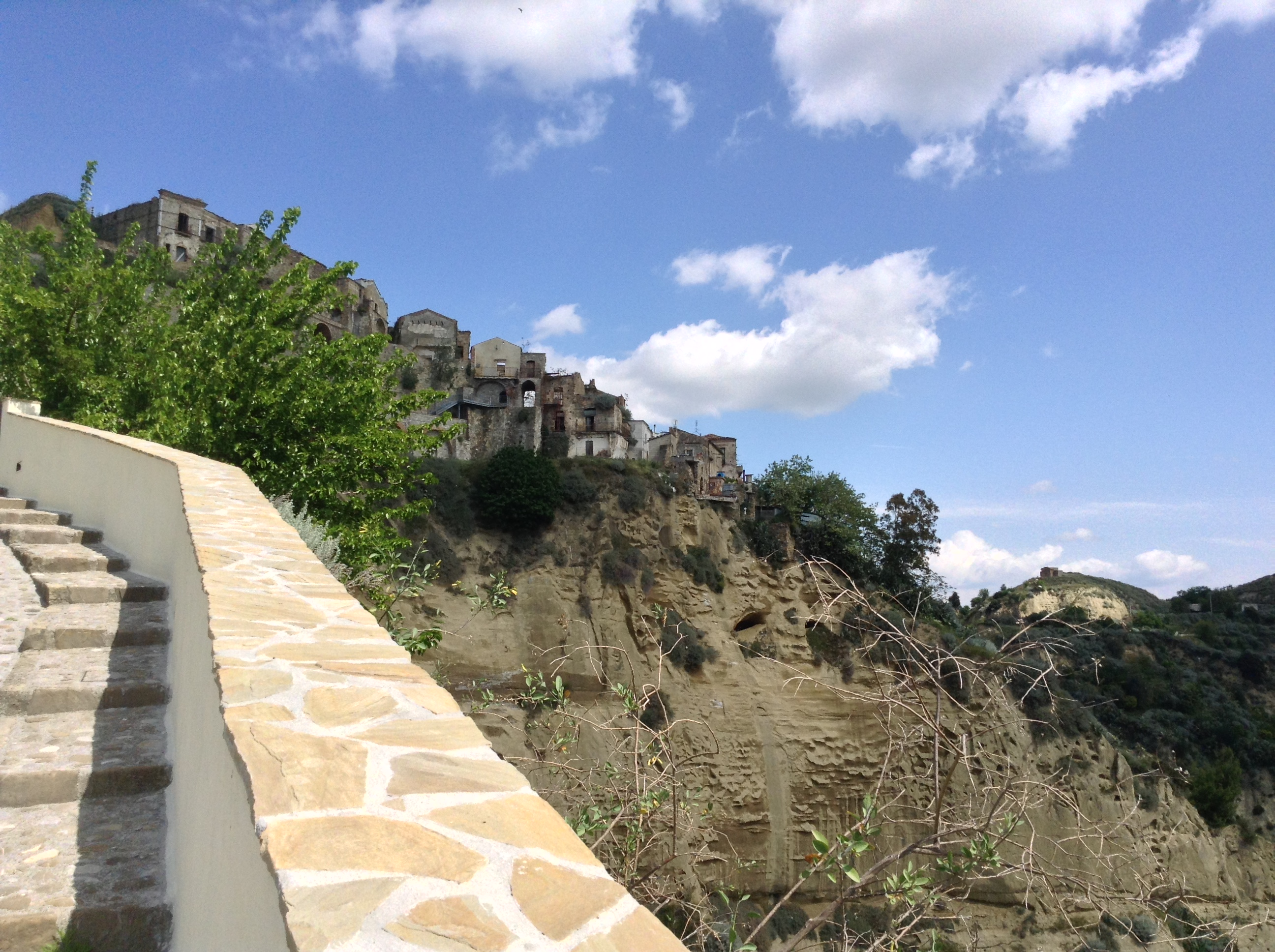
“Petrizza,” which connects Rabatana to the rest of the town, commissioned by the Duke of Tursi, Carlo Doria, in 1594.

Between the 13th century and the 14th century the nearby Anglona suffered numerous fires, most notably in 1369 when the entire town was set on fire. The fire was so strong and devastating that it decreed its decline. The relocation of citizens from the Anglona settlement, at the behest of Queen Joanna I, led to a significant transformation of Tursi, which until then could only be traced back to the Rabatana fortress. Thus massive construction activity began outside the Rabatana bridge, the only access to the core of the settlement.

In the 16th century Tursi was among the most populous towns in the region, with over ten thousand inhabitants. In 1543 the dioceses of Anglona and Tursi were united, constituting the diocese of Anglona-Tursi, which from 1546 had a chair in Tursi.

In 1552 Charles V, Emperor of the Holy Roman Empire assigned the Principality of Melfi to the admiral and statesman Andrea Doria. Upon his death in 1560 the title passed to his nephew, Prince of Melfi Gianandrea Doria. Later, in 1594, Carlo Doria inherited the county, then duchy, from his father, becoming the first duke of Tursi. Out of gratitude to the townspeople he renamed his home from Palazzo Doria to Palazzo Tursi, currently the seat of the municipality of Genoa. In those years Carlo Doria had a huge stone staircase (“petrizza”) built in the Rabatana district at his own expense, which is still in use today and has the peculiarity of possessing the same number of steps as the staircase present inside Palazzo Tursi.

The city's greatest development occurred towards the end of the 16th century, a period when Tursi was very wealthy and which coincided with its elevation to a duchy. In 1601 the historian Scipione Mazzella said: "... This region is for the most part mountainous, but nevertheless very fertile with all sorts of grain and produces very good wines, this beautiful town produces in abundance wheat, oil, apples, wax, coriander, saffron, and cotton wool, which greatly abound in the land of Tursi, formerly known as Torsia." The city's territory extended as far as the Ionian Sea and included the tower of Trisaja, south of the mouth of the Sinni River, one of the seven coastal towers of the Kingdom of Naples on the Ionian coast of Lucania. It was also the city in the province with the largest number of families, numbering 1799, ahead of Melfi with 1772, Venosa with 1095, Potenza with 1082 and Tricarico with 1073.

A document from 1616 shows a dispute between two noble families of Tursi, the Picolla and the Brancalasso in the election of the new Chamberlain of the Rabatana. This testimony brings to light the existence of a public office of the Universitas of Tursi, especially in charge of the security of the Rabatana emphasizing the clear separation not only physical but also political-institutional between the village and the rest of the inhabited area.

In 1656 the plague invaded the streets of Tursi and those of the neighboring villages, and the population was drastically reduced also due to emigration.

In January 1735 King Charles III of Spain visited the lands along the Ionian coast, and the province of Basilicata then and until the Bourbon reform of 1816 comprised 117 municipalities and was divided into 4 subdivisions: Tursi, Maratea, Tricarico and Melfi. The Tursi apportionment included 30 towns, stretched from Montescaglioso to Ferrandina, to the borders of Calabria and from Terranova di Pollino to Gallicchio, and was the seat of the Royal Collector of Basilicata.

In 1769 the Doria lost the land, which was bought by the noble families of Donnaperna, Picolla, Panevino, Camerino and Brancalasso.

== The contemporary age ==
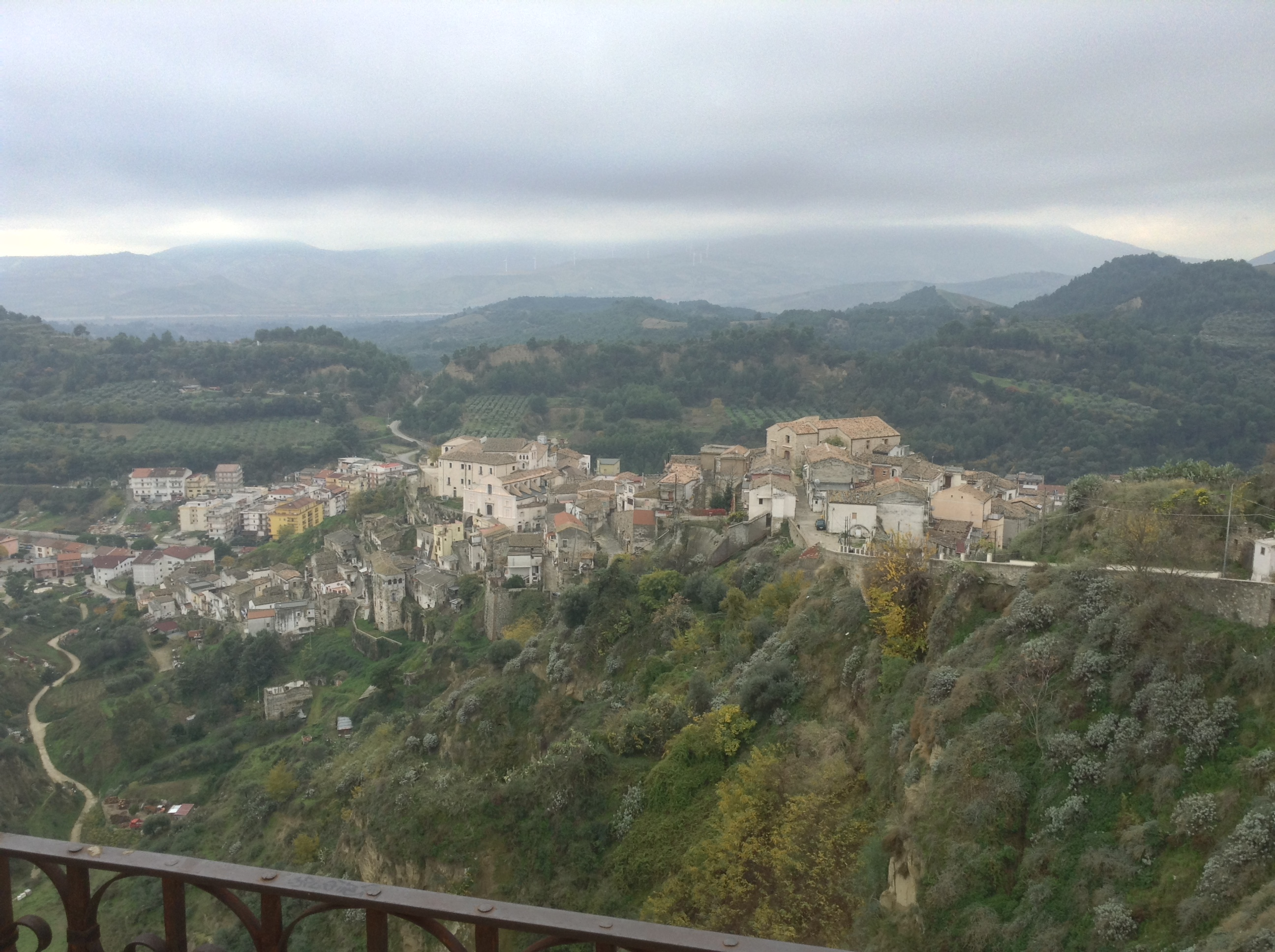
View of part of the city.

In 1799 it was temporarily annexed to the department of Crati, that is, to the Cosentian Calabria. In 1848 during the Springtime of the Peoples, Tursi saw the manifestation of uprisings that allowed the occupation of vast territories of the bishopric and the demesnes “Pisone,” “Monaca,” “Pozzo di Penne,” “Pantano,” and “Stigliano.” The territory of Tursi proved to be a hot spot for uprisings, due to the vast agrarian and cultivable area available to the town, which was among the largest in the area. In fact, in 1860 with the rise of the Lucanian insurrection, and shortly before, with the Gattini massacre in the town of Matera, the uprisings in Tursi were not long in coming either. At the first manifestation of unrest, the bishop of Anglona-Tursi, Gennaro Acciardi, fled the city. He took refuge in Naples and was the promoter of a reactionary movement by issuing a “pastoral action against the new political order,” but the reactionary demonstrations were quickly quelled.

During 1861 with the unification of Italy the first incidents of brigandage were attested in the woods between Policoro, Nova Siri, Rotondella and Tursi. (Note: ASP, Prefecture, Brigandage, 1.5. Telegram dated May 15, 1861, from the Prefect of Potenza informing the Subprefect of Castrovillari about kidnappings committed in the area straddling the Calabro-Lucano border between the districts of Castrovillari and Lagonegro) The band of the brigand Scaliero of Latronico, just near Tursi, crossed paths with a squad of the National Guard. In the scuffle soldier Giuseppe Buglione lost his life. (Note: ASP, Trials of Historical Value, 222.13, Armed Gang Association, Conspiracy Against the Government, Murder, Robbery and Others, against Antonio Filardi, Nicola Sammartino, Egidantonio Papandrea and 25 other wrongdoers, c. 3) Other bands in the forest area were those of the brigand Alessandro Marino, natural son of Baron Villani of Castronuovo, (Note: ASP, Trials of Historical Value, 270.2-3, Alessandro Marino and others, charged with constituting an armed band and making an attempt directed at destroying the form of government, in S. Chirico Raparo, f. 2, c. 3.) and the band of the brigand Antonio Franco of Francavilla in Sinni, both of whom united in 1862. (Note: ASP, Trials of Historical Value, 223.11 Antonio Franco and others, accused of association of malefactors and robbery in Chiaromonte, 1862, c. 25.) In the following years, Marino himself would be shot in Tursi in 1864 after being captured during a firefight with the Chiaromonte National Guard.

These episodes and some raids against local peasants forced the municipality of Tursi to make several requests to the subprefecture for troops, which were always rejected. (Note: ASP, Brigandage, 1.11.) Thus in the following months Mayor Egidio Lauria wrote directly to the prefect of Potenza, (Note: ASP, Public Safety, Miscellany 1bis. 39, Mayor of Tursi.) who urged the subprefect in arranging for a battalion to be sent to Tursi under his orders. In reality, the sub-prefect had long had a shortage of troops, and unable to send new battalions, he could never fulfill the prefect's request. Therefore, the following year, at the further urging of the mayor, the subprefect acted differently by asking the Rotondella carabinieri, the Colobraro troops and the Tursi National Guard to cooperate with each other and organize with the mayor so as to take targeted actions against the bands. (Note: ASP, Public Security, Miscellany, 1bis. 39, Presence of brigands in the Tursi district. Subprefect's January 22 report to the Prefecture informing the Prefect of measures taken in the Tursi area.)

In the early 1900s, many young Tursi men lost their lives on the front lines during World War I. In World War II, soldiers from Tursi took part in the Italian campaign in Russia.

=== Coat of Arms and Gonfalon of Tursi ===
The tower, depicted cylindrically and with three floors, recalls that of the ancient castle and the origins around it. The sun symbolizes light and life, the two laurel branches glory and prevalence over Anglona, and the olive trees represent the wealth of the land. The website Comuni italiani describes the coat of arms thus:

Blazon of the coat of arms

Light blue in color, enclosed in golden ribbons, surmounted by a turreted crown, it bears the design of a tower with two olive trees on either side surmounted by two laurel branches with a sun above.

Blazon of the gonfalon

Blue-colored banner, charged with the coat of arms with the inscription centered in gold at the top: Municipality of Tursi, in the center is the coat of arms resting between two laurel branches tied together with a central tricolor bow, still further down persist gold decorations, the pointed metal top depicts the same design as the coat of arms, the side cords are golden.

=== Honors ===
Title of City - ribbon for ordinary uniform

Title of City
"On May 4, 2006, with Resolution No. 2, prot. 1778, for “Recognition of the Title of City,” President of the Republic Carlo Azeglio Ciampi, by decree, awarded the municipality of Tursi the honorary title of City for the historical and civic importance Tursi has had since its distant founding"

== See also ==
- Magna Graecia
- Lucania (theme)
- Roman Catholic Diocese of Tursi-Lagonegro

== Notes ==
Sources consulted in the State Archives of Potenza (ASP):

== Bibliography ==
=== Ancient sources ===
- Eutropius. Breviarium ab Urbe condita, book III, 13.
- Livy. Periochae degli Ab Urbe condita libri, book XI and XII.
- Pliny the Elder. Naturalis historia, book III, 97 and 98.
- Strabo. Geographica, VI, 1, 14.

=== Modern sources ===
- Alessio, Giovanni (1977). Un'oasi linguistica preindoeuropea nella regione baltica?. Firenze: Pamphlet.
- Al-Idrisi, Muhammad (1100–1166). Book of King Roger. Translated by Michele, Amari; Celestino, Schiaparelli.
- Andenna, Cristina (2015). Anglona dalle origini sino ai primi anni del Trecento.
- Antonini, Giuseppe (1745). La Lucania vol I. Napoli: Ed. A. Forni.
- Bruno, Rocco (1977). Storia di Tursi. Ginosa: Tip. Miranda.
- Buonsanto, Vito (1819). Introduzione alla geografia antica e moderna delle provincie delle due sicilie di qua dal faro. Napoli: Tipografia Filomatica.
- Cosmai, Mario (1991). Antichi toponimi di Puglia e Basilicata. Bari: Ed. Levante.
- Peters-Custot, Annick (2009). Les Grecs de l'Italie méridionale post-byzantine: Une acculturation en douceur. Roma: École Française de Rome. ISBN 978-2-7283-0854-5.
- Darrouzès, Jean (1981). Notitiae episcopatuum ecclesiae constantinopolitanae. Parigi: Institut Etudes Byzantines. ISBN 978-2-901049-30-2.
- Di Cugno, Michele (2010). Il brigantaggio postunitario. Dalle cronache al mito. Bari: Ed. Mario Adda.
- Eubel, Konrad (1503). Hierarchia catholica Medii et Recentioris aevi sive summorum pontificum, S.R.E. cardinalium, ecclesiarum antistitum series. E documentis tabularii praesertim Vaticani collecta, digesta, edita.
- Giustiniani, Lorenzo (1797–1816). Dizionario geografico-ragionato del Regno di Napoli. Napoli.
- Guillou, André (1972). Spiritualità e società religiosa greca nell'Italia Meridionale e la Sicilia. Bari: Istituto Superiore di Teologia Ecumenica "S. Nicola".
- Kehr, Paul Fridolin (1908). Italia pontificia, sive, Repertorium privilegiorum et litterarum a Romanis pontificibus ante annum MCLXXXXVIII Italiae ecclesiis monasteriis civitatibus singulisque personis concessorum: Etruria. Apud Weidmannos.
- Lenormant, François (1881–1884). La Grande Grèce. Paris.
- Martucci (1790). Ragionamento intorno al pieno dominio della Real Mensa Vescovile di Anglona e Tursi sul feudo di Anglona contro l'Università ed alcuni particolari cittadini di Tursi. Napoli.
- Mazzella, Scipione (1601). Descrittione del regno di Napoli. Napoli: G. B. Cappelli.
- Nigro, Antonio (1851). Memoria tipografica ed istorica sulla città di Tursi e sull'antica Pandosia di Eraclea oggi Anglona. Napoli: Tip. Miranda.
- Pedio, Tommaso (1986). La Basilicata borbonica. Venosa: Ed. Osanna.
- Pedio, Tommaso (1963). Contadini e galantuomini nelle province del Mezzogiorno d'Italia durante i moti del 1848. Matera: Ed. Fratelli Montemurro.
- Pedio, Tommaso (1966). Vita politica in Italia meridionale. 1860-1870. Potenza: Ed. La nuova libreria.
- Quilici, Lorenzo (1967). Forma Italiae vol I, Siris-Heraclea. Roma: Istituto di topografia antica dell'università di Roma.
- Quilici, Lorenzo; Quilici Gigli, Stefania (2003). Carta Archeologica Della Valle Del Sinni. Documentazione Cartografica. L'erma Di Bretschneider. ISBN 88-8265-230-0.
- Racioppi, Giacomo (1889). Storia dei popoli della Lucania e della Basilicata, vol 1 e vol 2. Roma: Loescher.
- Robertella, Tito (1984). Nuove Luci Lucane. Avellino: Ed. Menna.
- Romanelli, Domenico (1815). Antica topografia istorica del regno di Napoli, volume I. Napoli: Stamperia Reale.
- Troyli, Placido (1747). Istoria generale del Reame di Napoli. Napoli: Regio Officio Topografico.
- Ughelli, Ferdinando (1721). Italia Sacra sive da episcopis Italiae et insularum adiacentium. Venezia: Apud Sebastianum Coleti.
- Visentin, Barbara (2009). La Basilicata nell'alto Medioevo. Il caso di Santa Maria di Anglona. Napoli: Ed. Liguori. ISBN 978-88-207-4401-4.
- Buck, R. J. (1975). The Ancient Roads of Southeastern Lucania. Vol. 43. British School at Rome. pp. 98–117.
- Pellegrino, Bruno (1978). Legittimismo borbonico e temporalismo: i vescovi del Mezzogiorno e il rifiuto della rivoluzione nazionale del 1860, in Società e Storia, n. 3. Ed. Franco Angeli.
