= Guido Sette =

Archbishop of Genoa

Guido Sette (1304–1367/68) was the archbishop of Genoa from 1358 until his death. He was a close friend of Petrarch.

== Family and education ==
Sette was born in the Lunigiana in 1304, the same year as Petrarch, whose letters attest to their friendship from an early age and are an important source for Sette's biography. Petrarch depicts Sette as a physically small man of fragile health but with a subtle mind and good judgement.

Sette's family controlled the castle of Trebiano before 1285. Septem (Latin for 'seven', Italian sette) was probably originally a nickname before becoming a family name. Sette had an uncle, also named Guido Sette, attested in documents between 1253 and 1315. The elder Guido held a canonry in the cathedral of Luni, among other benefices. In 1315 or 1316, he accompanied his nephew, Petrarch and Petrarch's father on a trip to Fontaine-de-Vaucluse. Sette's mother's name, Caracosa, is known from his final will and testament.

Sette first met Petrarch in Genoa in 1311, while his family was relocating to Avignon in Provence, where they settled the following year. The family eventually moved out of the city to Carpentras. Sette and Petrarch studied grammar and rhetoric together in Carpentras under Convenevole da Prato. Both went on to study law at the University of Montpellier in 1316, whence they moved on to the University of Bologna in 1320. A riot in 1321, forced their relocation to Imola. They visited Rimini and Venice in the company of Petrarch's preceptor (guardian) before returning to Provence. They only resumed their studies in Bologna in the fall of 1322. Sette eventually received a degree in canon law (perhaps both laws) and went into legal practice.

Despite his lifelong relationship with Petrarch, Sette's literary interest are mostly unknown. He read Cicero and also the works of his friend, who in one letter laments that Sette had not received his De remediis utriusque fortunae. He is counted among the earliest Renaissance humanists of Genoa.

== Vicar and archdeacon ==
Around 1334, Sette received a vicariarte in the diocese of Bologna. He was vicar general and president of the diocesan court in 1336 and 1337. In 1339, Pope Benedict XII, who sought to regain influence at Genoa following the creation of the dogate, appointed Sette to a vacant canonry there and named him archdeacon of the cathedral. The canon who vacated the post, Gottifredo Spinola, performed the consecration.

In 1341, Sette acted as vicar general on behalf of Archbishop Dino di Radicofani and interceded with King Alfonso XI of Castile on behalf of some Genoese shipowners who had been robbed by some Castilians. Between 1342 and 1345, he was frequently at the papal court in Avignon. There is no trace in the records of the work he did for the papacy. He appointed procurators to manage his canonry during his long absences. Between August 1351 and April 1353, during prolonged stays in Avignon, Petrarch lived with Sette. This was the last time they met. In the summer of 1353, Sette stayed at Petrarch's house in Vaucluse for a few days while Petrarch was in Italy. He was still in Provence in 1355, when he helped arrange an exchange of benefices between Petrarch and their mutual friend, Lodewijk Heyligen.

== Archbishop ==
On 2 July 1358, Pope Innocent VI appointed him to the vacant archdiocese of Genoa. He earned a reputation as a devout pastor. One of his first recorded acts was to intercede on behalf of the Republic of Genoa in its negotiations with the Crown of Aragon over its rights in Sardinia and Corsica. He was a major sponsor of the foundations of the nunnery of Santa Margherita della Rocchetta (1360), the abbey of San Gerolamo della Cervara (1361) and the hospital of San Desiderio (1365).

As archbishop, Sette maintained close relations with the papacy and with the doge, Simone Boccanegra, both strongly opposed to the Visconti of Milan. In 1360, he imposed an extraordinary levy on his clergy of 100 lire. He imposed another of 400 lire in 1365. These contributions went to supporting the legatine missions of Cardinals Gil de Albornoz and Androin de la Roche in Italy. In 1364, he received from Pope Urban V powers that allowed him to reduce his reliance on vicars in the administration of justice. From 1365, using his power of excommunication, he fought the Malaspina for possession of certain properties that belonged to the diocese of Luni.

Petrarch records that Sette suffered from gout. Sette's last will and testament was drawn up on 18 December 1367 in the archiepiscopal palace. Only the part of it dealing with his heirs survives, not the part containing pious bequests. His mother was his heir. At her death, his goods were to pass to Bishop Bernabò Griffi of Luni and, at his death, to the cathedral of Sarzana. The date of his death is not recorded, but it was before the end of February 1368. He was buried in Cervara. His epitaph, inscribed some thirty years later and now lost, gave his date of death improbably as 20 November 1367, before his will was made.

== Petrarch's letters ==
Sette was the addressee of fourteen of Petrarch's surviving letters: thirteen of his Epistolae familiares (5.16, 5.17, 5.18, 17.3, 17.4, 17.5, 19.8, 19.9, 19.10, 19.16, 19.17, 20.9 and 23.12) and one of his Epistolae seniles (10.2). In the case of Familiares 20.9, he is one of three addressees. He is also mentioned in Familiares 9.2 and 20.6, in Seniles 5.1 and in Petrarch's De vita solitaria.

Familiares 17.5 is Petrarch's response on learning of Sette's visit to his home in Vaucluse while he was away. Familiares 19.9 laments the state of endemic warfare in Italy. Familiares 19.10 is a response to Sette's appointment as archbishop. Petrarch congratulates him, but also warns him that the responsibility will lead to a loss of inner peace. Familiares 19.16 is a response to a letter from Sette asking about Petrarch's daily routine, for which it is an invaluable source, while 19.17, from the summer of 1357, is a response to Sette's inquiries about Petrarch's son Giovanni, who later stayed with Sette for a time in Avignon when on the outs with his father.

Seniles 10.2 is an autobiographical letter in which Petrarch reminisces about he and Sette's school days, first trip to Vaucluse and time at university. He says that his years are "certainly not equal [to yours] in merit, but the same in number", indicating that he and Sette were the same age. Of their separate pathways after university, he writes that "you searched for suits in the courts, I for tranquility in the woods." It is likely that Sette died before ever reading Seniles 10.2, which is dated 1367.

== Bibliography ==
- Armstrong, Guyda (2004). "Sette, Guido". In Christopher Kleinhenz (ed.). Medieval Italy: An Encyclopedia. Vol. 2. Routledge. p. 1024.
- Macchiavello, Sandra (2018). "Sette, Guido". Dizionario Biografico degli Italiani (in Italian). Vol. 92: Semino–Sisto IV. Rome: Istituto dell'Enciclopedia Italiana. ISBN 978-88-12-00032-6.
- Petti Balbi, Giovanna (2018). "Intellectual Life". In Carrie E. Beneš (ed.). A Companion to Medieval Genoa. Brill. pp. 320–344.
- Picone, Michelangelo (2002). "Sette, Guido". In Peter Hainsworth; David Robey (eds.). The Oxford Companion to Italian Literature. Oxford University Press.
- Polonio, Valeria (2018). "The Religious Orders". In Carrie E. Beneš (ed.). A Companion to Medieval Genoa. Brill. pp. 368–394.
- Wilkins, Ernest Hatch (1961). Life of Petrarch. University of Chicago Press.
