= Lucania (theme) =

Byzantine province in southern Italy

Theme of Lucania
- Theme of the Byzantine Empire
- c. 968 – c. 1050
- Map of Byzantine themes in southern Italy (yellow) c. 1000.
- Capital: Tursi
- Historical era: Middle Ages
  - Reorganization of Byzantine Italy: c. 968
  - Norman conquest of southern Italy: 21 July

The Theme of Lucania (Greek: Θέμα Λουκανίας) was a Byzantine province (theme) in southern Italy, that was established probably c. 968, under emperor Nikephoros II Phokas, and existed until the Norman conquest of southern Italy at the middle of the 11th century.

== History ==
It was situated between the two older Byzantine provinces of Longobardia in the east and Calabria in the west, and was formed to encompass Lombard-populated areas of the theme of Longobardia where Byzantine Greeks from Calabria had settled in the early 10th century (the regions of Latinianon, Lagonegro and Mercurion).

Tursi was chosen as the theme's capital and also as the seat of a new metropolitan bishopric to encompass the province. The theme of Lucania was probably under the overall authority of the Catepan of Italy at Bari.

The Lucania Theme lasted nearly one hundred years: from 968 to 1050 AD. It was fully conquered by the Normans, with the help of the Longobards of the Principate of Salerno.

The province corresponds roughly to the modern Italian region of Basilicata.

== See also ==
- Byzantine Italy
- Catapanate of Italy
- Mercurion (a territory situated along the Calabrian-Lucanian border)
- History of Tursi

== Sources ==
- Cosentino, Salvatore, ed. (2021). A Companion to Byzantine Italy. Boston-Leiden: Brill.
- Guillou, André (1965). "La Lucanie byzantine: Étude de géographie historique" (PDF). Byzantion (in French). 35: 119–149. Archived from the original on 2025-06-16.
- Kreutz, Barbara M. (1996). Before the Normans: Southern Italy in the Ninth and Tenth Centuries. Philadelphia: University of Pennsylvania Press.
- Loud, Graham A. (1999). "Southern Italy in the tenth century". New Cambridge Medieval History. Vol. 3. Cambridge: Cambridge University Press. pp. 624–645.
- Peters, Edward; Foulke, William D., eds. (2003) [1907]. Paul the Deacon: History of the Lombards. Philadelphia: University of Pennsylvania Press.
- Wickham, Chris (1981). Early Medieval Italy: Central Power and Local Society, 400-1000. Totowa, NJ: Barnes & Noble.
