= Cervara Abbey =

Former abbey in Santa Margherita Ligure, Liguria, Italy

Coordinates: 44.3133°N 9.2134°E

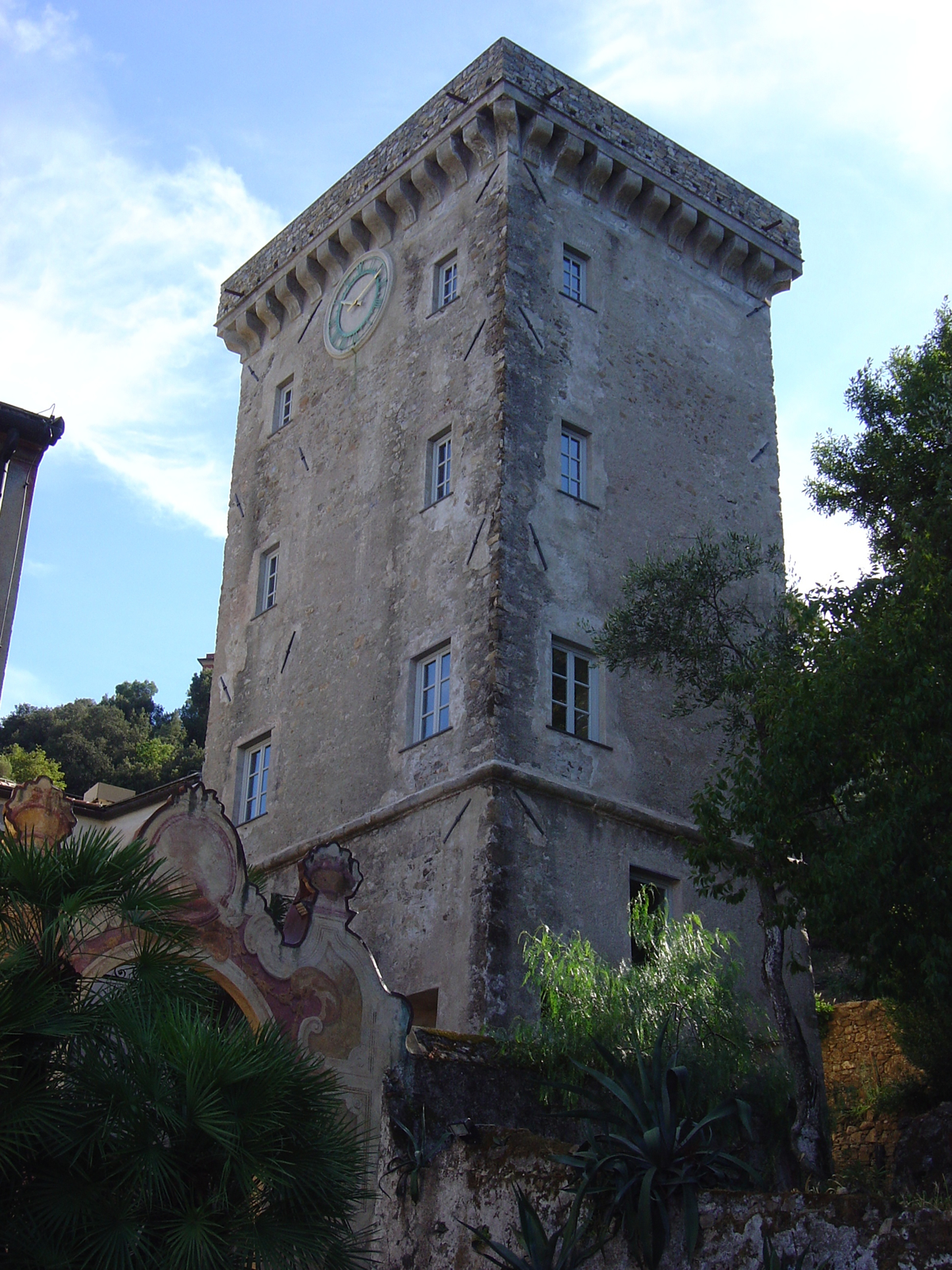
Tower of the Cervara Abbey complex

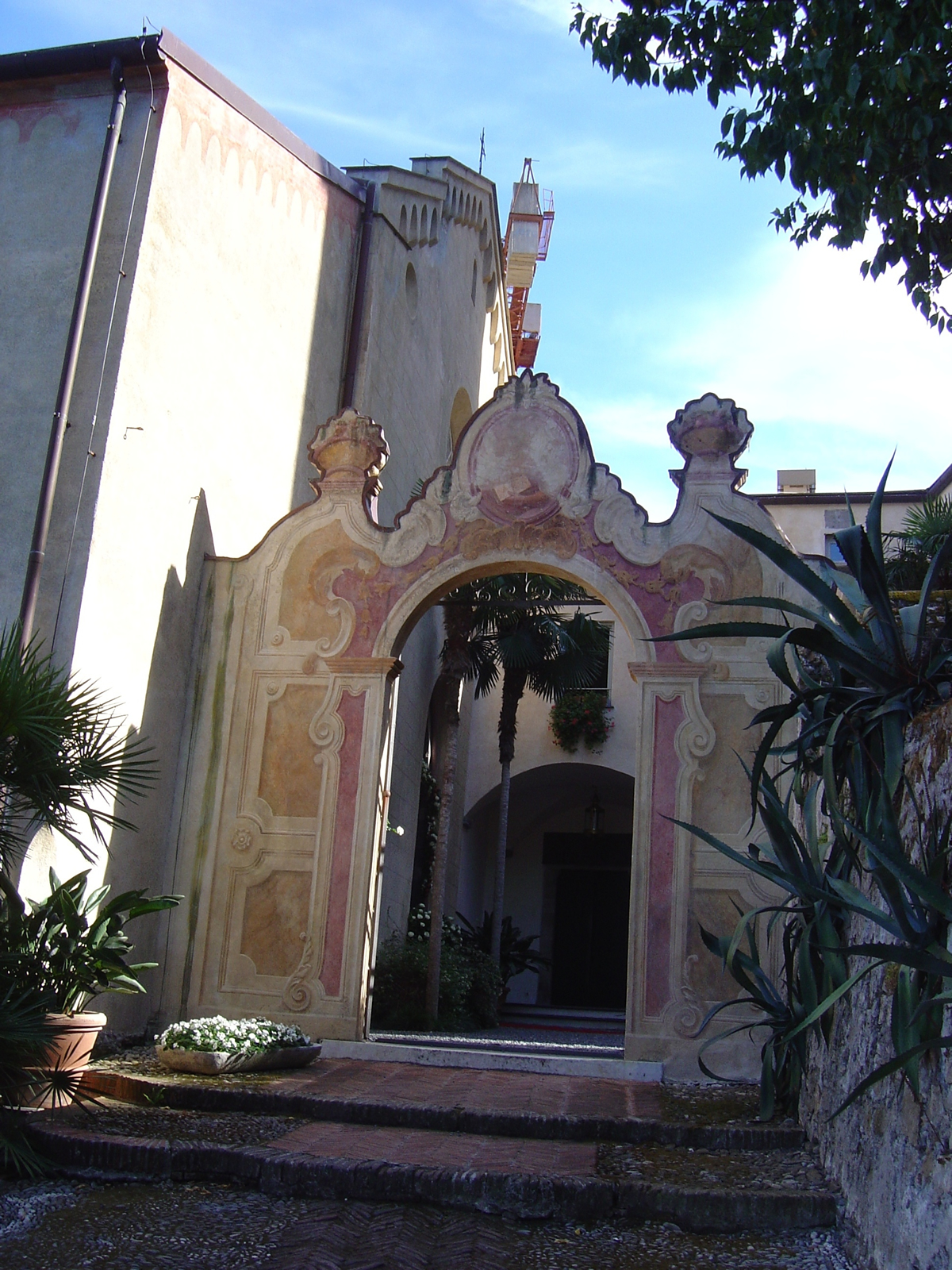
Portal of Cervara Abbey

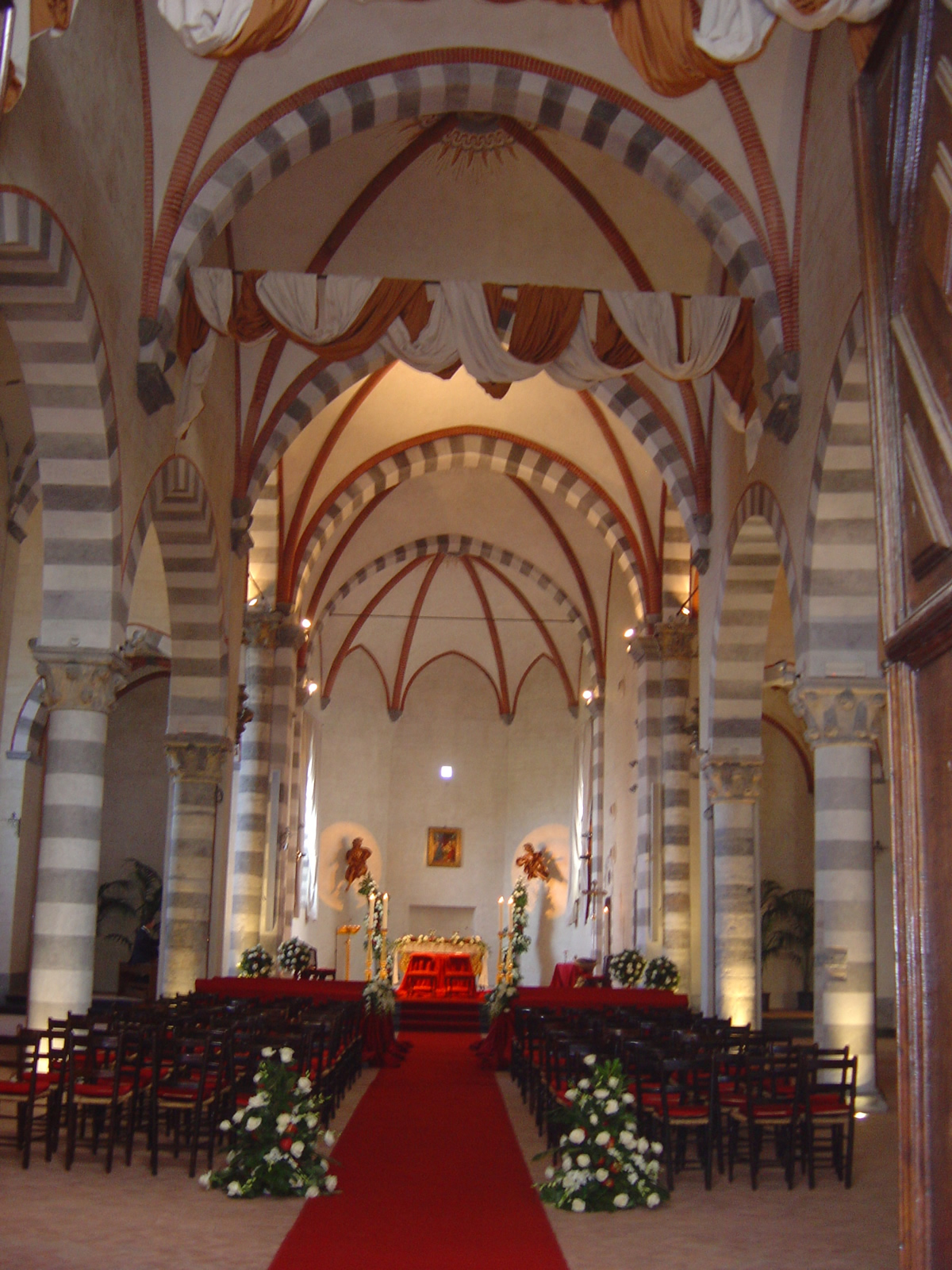
Cervara Abbey church interior.

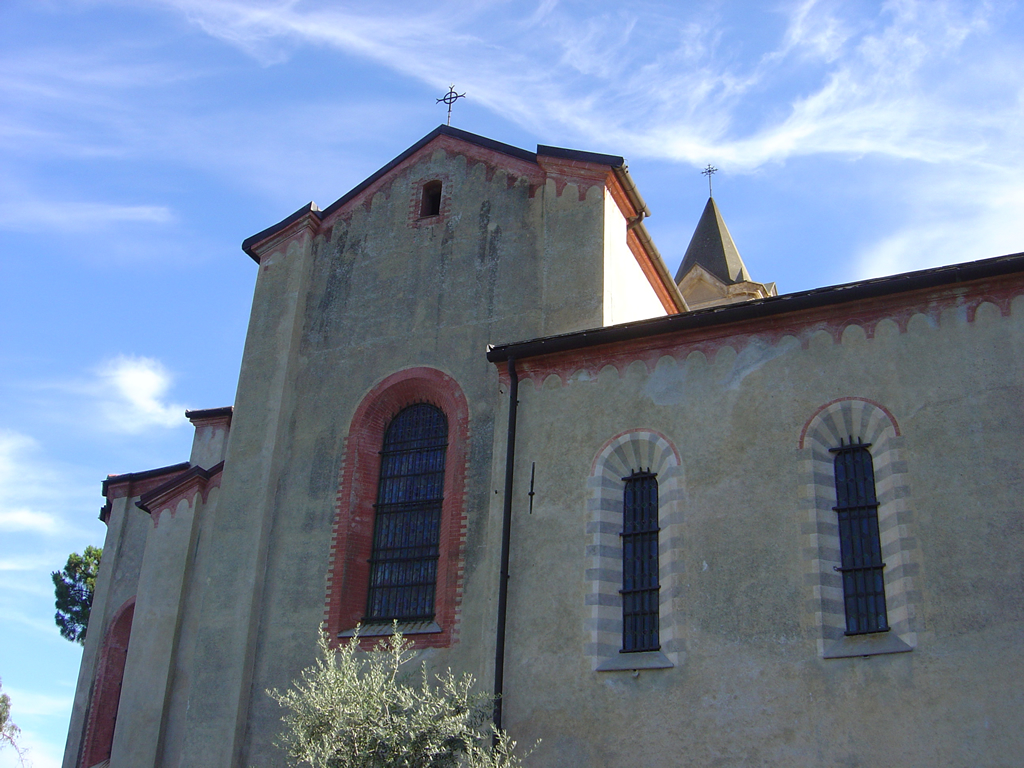
View of Cervara Abbey.

Cervara Abbey (Italian: Abbazia della Cervara or Abbazia di San Gerolamo al Monte di Portofino) is a former abbey in Santa Margherita Ligure, Liguria region, northern Italy. It is on the coastal road to Portofino. The abbey complex is a designated National Monument of Italy.

== Origin of the name ==
In the Middle Ages this site, as the whole stretch of coastline on the Gulf of Tigullio down to the sea to Portofino, was called Silvaria (silvae from the Latin word meaning "woods"), because of its native woodlands. The name "Silvaria" was later Italianate in Cervara.

== History ==
The monastery building was built in 1361 by Ottone Lanfranco, a priest at the church of Santo Stefano in Genoa, on land owned by the Carthusian monks. It was dedicated to St. Jerome.

Later, Pope Eugene IV transferred ownership of it to the Benedictines of Monte Cassino (c. 1420) and had it restored. The monastery became a center for the spread of Flemish artistic influence in Liguria, with works such as the Cervara Polyptych (1506), by Gerard David, and an Adoration of the Magi triptych by Pieter Coecke van Aelst.

The monastery was elevated to the rank of abbey in 1546. In the same period it was fortified in response to the increasing inroads made by North African pirates. In the late 18th century, after the French conquest of Italy, the abbey was suppressed and sacked. The precious Cervara polyptych was split up and sold separately. Four panels are now in the gallery of Palazzo Bianco in Genoa, while the other three are in Metropolitan Museum of Art in New York and the Musée du Louvre in Paris.

In 1804 French Trappists acquired the abbey and opened a school there, but they remained only until 1811. The complex subsequently became the property of the Diocese of Chiavari and, in 1859, was put up for sale. Marquis Giacomo Filippo Durazzo, a member of the Genoese nobility, acquired it in 1868; three years later he donated it to the Somaschi Fathers. From 1901 to 1937 the abbey was entrusted to the French Carthusians and in 1912 was declared a national monument.

== Architecture ==
The abbey has a consecrated church, a 16th-century cloister, the tower, the main body of the building and a beautiful garden. The abbey was rebuilt for the first time in the 16th century, with more work in the apse, while during the 17th century were changed from the high altar and the choir. In the 18th century were added more decorations in marble and complete painting of the walls.

The church has a Latin cross plan, made by striking apse angle that simulates the bowed head of Christ. The columns separating the three naves appear to be built with blocks alternating slate and marble, in the typical architectural style of Liguria, are actually two colors of brick covered with plaster.

During the recent restoration work was discovered a burial which in all probability is the archbishop of Genoa Guido Scetten, poet and scholar, fellow student and friend of Petrarch.

The abbey's altarpiece, the Cervara Altarpiece, was painted by Gerard David in 1506 and commissioned by Vincenzo Sauli, a Genoese official and banker. The original work, now dismantled, is likely to have been a three-tier polyptych including depictions of the Virgin and Child, two patron saints, the crucifixion of Jesus with the Angel Gabriel and Annunciate Virgin to either side, and God the Father.

It is located at the entrance of the complex, opposite the entrance of the Church. It was built in the 16th century to defend against raids by Saracen pirates, and despite his sighting function has the distinction of being set back from the monastery, it is considered a sign of respect and subordination to the sacredness of it.

The cloister is quadrangular in shape and two orders of levels. The marble decoration dates from an 18th-century restoration.

== Gardens ==
=== Italian Garden ===
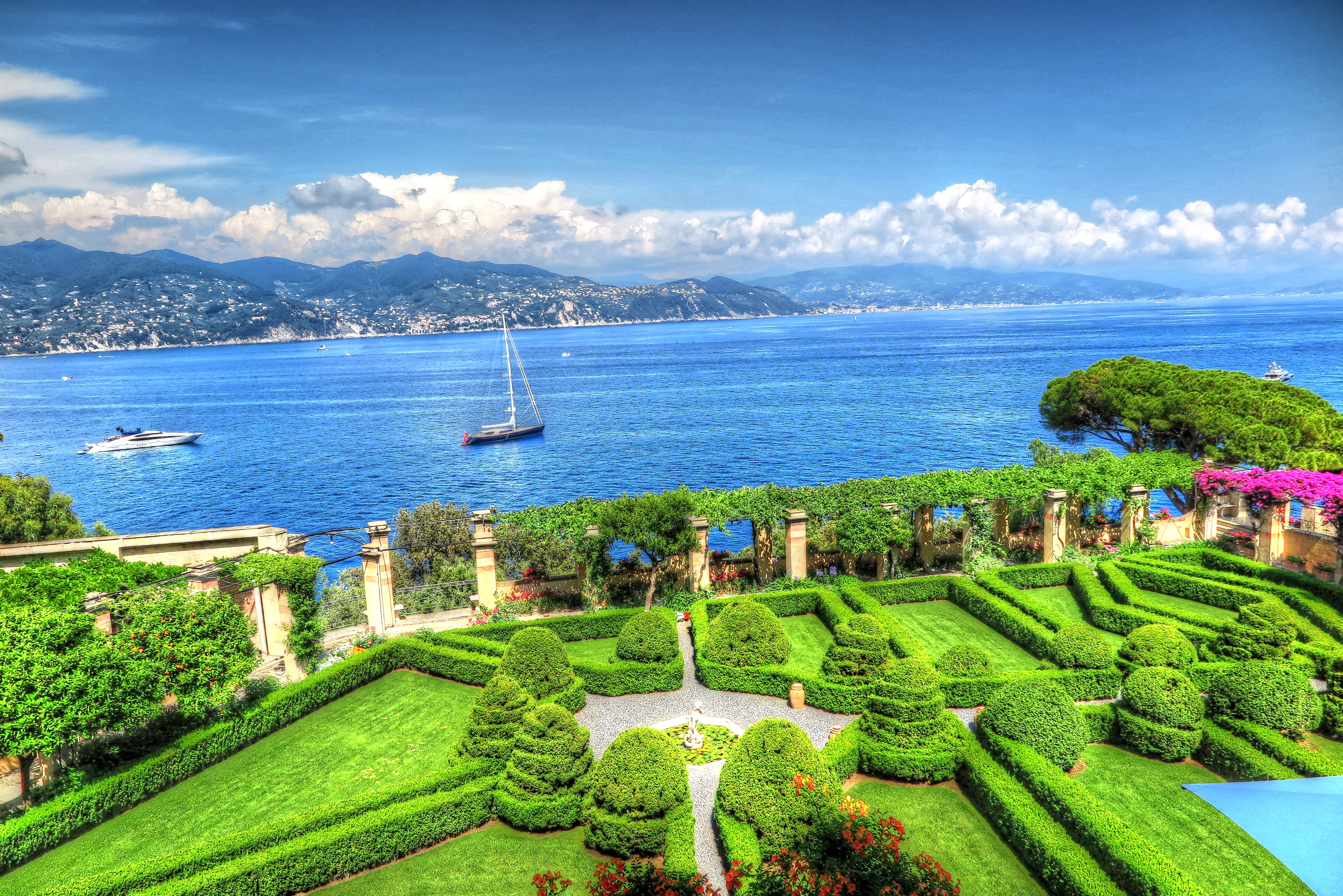
Giardino all'italiana Cervara Abbey

What was once the garden of the Benedictine monks is now the only monumental Giardino all'italiana or Italian Renaissance style garden preserved in Italian Riviera. It is unique in that it directly faces the sea.

The Italian garden is simple, linear, and proportionate. The Garden Monumental is created with hedges of boxwood (Buxus sempervirens L.) and refined achievements of topiary cones and cones surrounding the 17th century marble fountain depicting a putto.

Around the garden and the main building, terraces and gardens alternate framed pergolas, columns painted or brick, rare plants and blooms that steal exceptional attention depending on the season. A shaded courtyard takes its name from an old and monumental wisteria vine (Wisteria sinensis). Columns of the upper garden are completely covered with fragrant star jasmine (Trachelospermum jasminoides), Bougainvillea, rare pink capers, Bignonia, grapes, pepper trees (Schinus sp.), Camellias, roses, Hydrangeas, Strelizia, and several other species.

=== Herb garden ===
The monks' orchard has been preserved and enhanced with a collection of citrus trees. On the side facing the mountain, it has been kept a traditional vegetable garden where the monks since the Middle Ages grew the "simple" (plant varieties with medicinal virtues), medicinal plants and herbs of the promontory of Portofino, low box hedges and particles alternating crops such rare species of citrus in terracotta pots, as was customary in monasteries.

Among the herbs are: Calendula, Allium schoenoprasum, Artemisia dracunculus (tarragon), Ruta graveolens (rue grass), Helichrysum italicum (helichrysum), Melissa officinalis, Mentha piperita, Origanum vulgare, Origanum majorana (marjoram), Pimpinella anisum (anise or pimpinella), Rheum officinalis (rhubarb), Rosmarinus officinalis, Salvia officinalis, Santolina chamaecyparissus, Timo common Thymus 'Faustini', Thymus × citriodorus 'Anderson Gold' (thyme-leaved yellow).

=== Garden of the Hesperides ===
The Garden of the Hesperides contains citrus trees, including: lemon, bergamot orange, bitter orange, grapefruit, variegated calamondin, mandarin orange, Nagami kumquat, oval kumquat (Fortunella margarita), and Buddha's hand citron (Citrus medica var. sarcodactylis).

=== Natural area ===
In the upper area the landscape is set in a land once cultivated in rows and in an ancient Mediterranean forest. Native oak (Quercus sp.) dominates above in the shrub habitats. In the woodlands, Aleppo pine, mastic, viburnum, strawberry trees (Arbutus unedo), and other species predominate. Each has a habitat niche in which it thrives and flourishes. Fauna large and small is in this natural area. The rare butterfly Charaxes jasius feeds only on the leaves of strawberry trees. The hoopoe and a host of various other birds are heard, but rarely seen. Tracks of fox and wild boar are often seen.

== Present day ==
The abbey is now privately owned, and is open to the public for cultural performances, concerts, and visits in small groups by appointment. Also private events are hosted indoors and in the gardens, such as weddings, business meetings, and conferences.

=== Restoration ===
The current owners began restoration work upon buying the Abbey, to return the monastery to its historical beauty. The restoration has as the goal the full recovery of the monument. The structural architect is Mide Osculati. The painting restorer is Pinin Brambilla Barcilon, who was the director of the restoration of The Last Supper by Leonardo da Vinci, and the Director of the Conservation and Restoration Center of the Palace of Venaria. It is under the supervision and with the collaboration of the Office for the Environmental and Architectural Heritage of Liguria.

In 2011 the prison of Francis I of France in the tower was restored. A plaque, commemorating the forced stay, has the words he wrote to his mother Louise of Savoy, on the night of the disastrous 1525 Battle of Pavia against the army of Emperor Charles V — "All is lost, except honor."

== Famous guests ==
The prestige of San Girolamo della Cervara Abbey and its location attracts visitors for the passage of famous historical people, whose visits are written in the pages of local journals. They include: Petrarch (the poet Francesco Petrarca), Saint Catherine of Siena on the way back to Avignon, Pope Gregory XI (1376), the Holy Roman Emperor Maximilian of Austria, Don John of Austria who defeated the Turks at the battle of Lepanto (1571), the writer Alessandro Piccolomini, and Guglielmo Marconi, the inventor the wireless telegraph.

There were also those who stopped at Cervara against their will, including: King Francis I of France after being defeated by Charles V of Spain at the Battle of Pavia in 1525, waiting to leave for Spain, had the misfortune to be imprisoned in the small tower overlooking the sea for a week.

More recently, weddings of the famous include: the singer Rod Stewart with Penny Lancaster; the English national football player Wayne Rooney (at the time Manchester United F.C.); Alberto Gilardino (at the time Fiorentina); Antonio Cassano (at the time Sampdoria) which was attended by Gigi D'Alessio, a friend of the bridegroom, who sang for the couple.
