= Palazzo Doria-Tursi =

Palace and museum in Genoa, Italy

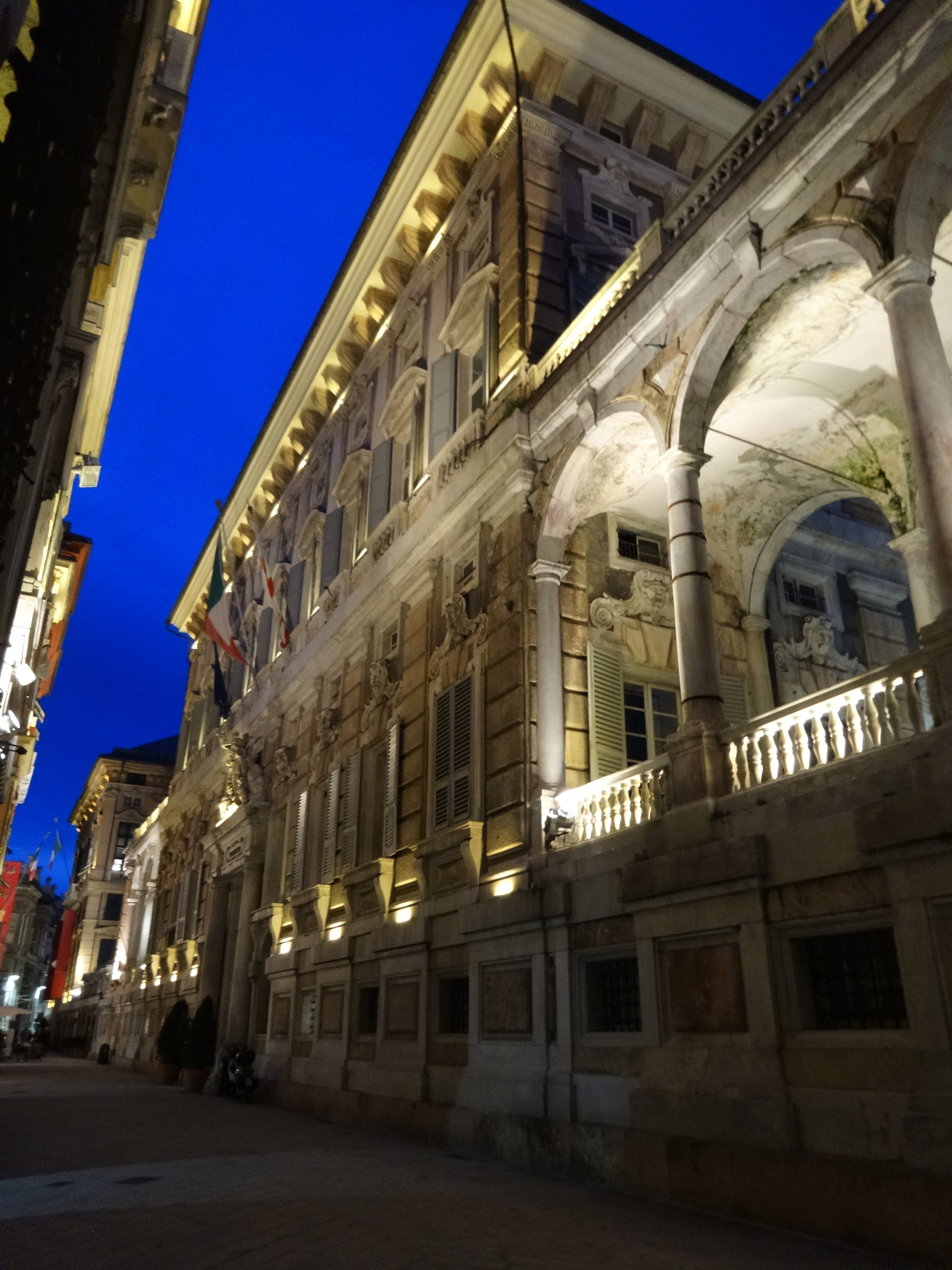
Exterior

The palazzo Doria-Tursi or palazzo Niccolò Grimaldi is a building on Via Giuseppe Garibaldi in the historic town centre of Genoa. With Palazzo Rosso and Palazzo Bianco it houses the Strada Nuova Museums. In July 2006, all three palaces and the streets around them became a UNESCO world heritage site. Since 1848, the Palazzo Doria-Tursi has housed the city hall of Genoa.

== History ==
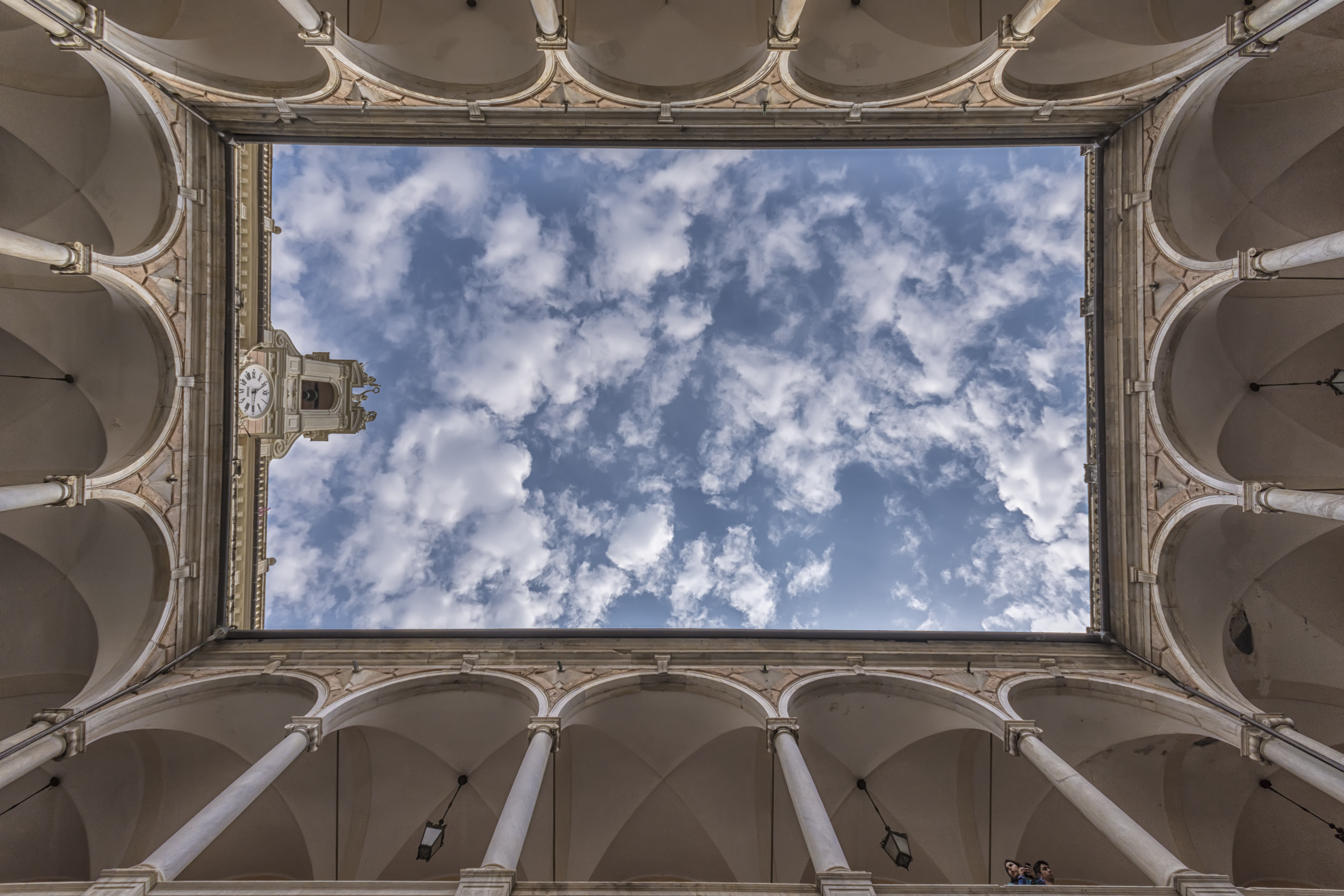
A courtyard in the Palazzo

The largest palazzo on the street and the only one built on three lots of land, it was begun in 1565 by the Mannerist architects Domenico and Giovanni Ponzello, pupils of Galeazzo Alessi, for Niccolò Grimaldi. Grimaldi was known as "il Monarca" for his huge number of noble titles and for being the main banker for Philip II of Spain. It had two large gardens to frame the central building. In 1597, the large loggias facing the street were added, when the palazzo was acquired by Giovanni Andrea Doria for his younger son Carlo, Duke of Tursi, giving the building its present name.

Following the Kingdom of Sardinia's annexation of the Republic of Genoa, the building was acquired by Victor Emmanuel I of Sardinia in 1820, at which point it was rebuilt by the Savoy court architect Carlo Randoni, adding the clock-tower.

== Architecture ==
=== Exterior ===
The façade is the longest on the street, so much so that in the engravings of the "Palazzi di Genova" made by Rubens in 1622, the image dedicated to the "Palace of Don Carlo Doria Duke of Tursi" could only fit half of it. The two side loggias were later additions commissioned by Giovanni Andrea Doria and built by Taddeo Carlone, the sculptor of the white marble portal with armed figures, which originally surrounded the eagle of the Dorias, today replaced by the cross shield, Coat of arms of Genoa.

The façade is marked by alternating materials in different colors: pink stone from Finale Ligure, gray-black slate, and precious white Carrara marble. The main elevation consists of two superimposed orders. The raised level above the large plinth features windows with unique designs, alternating with rustic pilasters. The upper level has Doric pilasters. Grotesque masks with animal-like features sit above the windows on both levels, enhancing the sculptural effect of the façade.

=== Interior ===
Especially innovative is the original and brilliant architectural solution involving the sequence of internal spaces — atrium, staircase, and an elevated rectangular courtyard in relation to the portico and double-flight staircase — creating a stunning play of light and perspective. The palace represents the height of residential grandeur for the Genoese aristocracy, fully reflected in its interior decorations, including paintings, some of which belong to the museum collection of the Palazzo Bianco, or are visible in the "Hall of Representation" through frescoes and paintings.

== Gallery ==
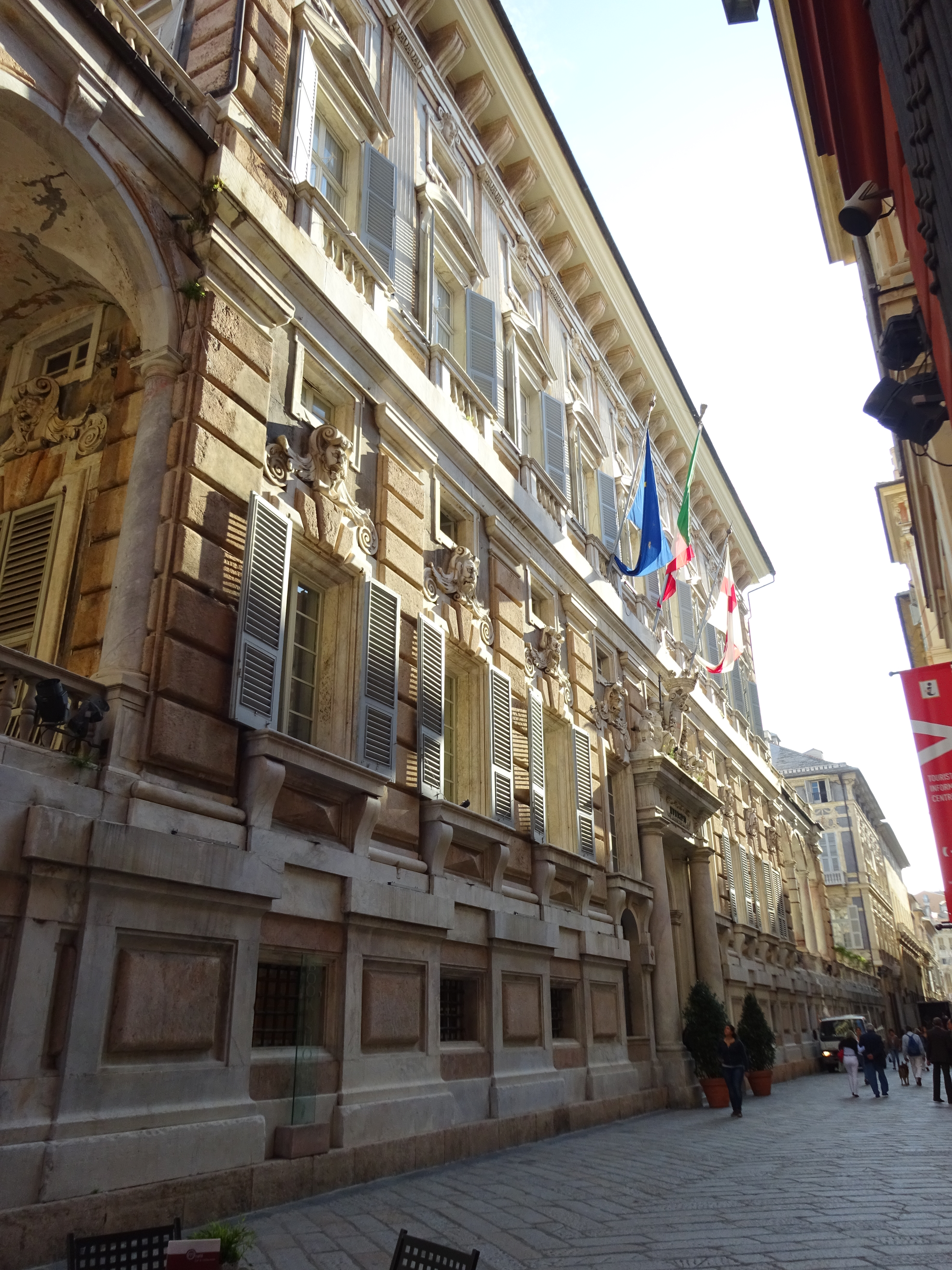
Façade in pink Finale stone, grey-black Valfontabuona slate and white Carrara marble

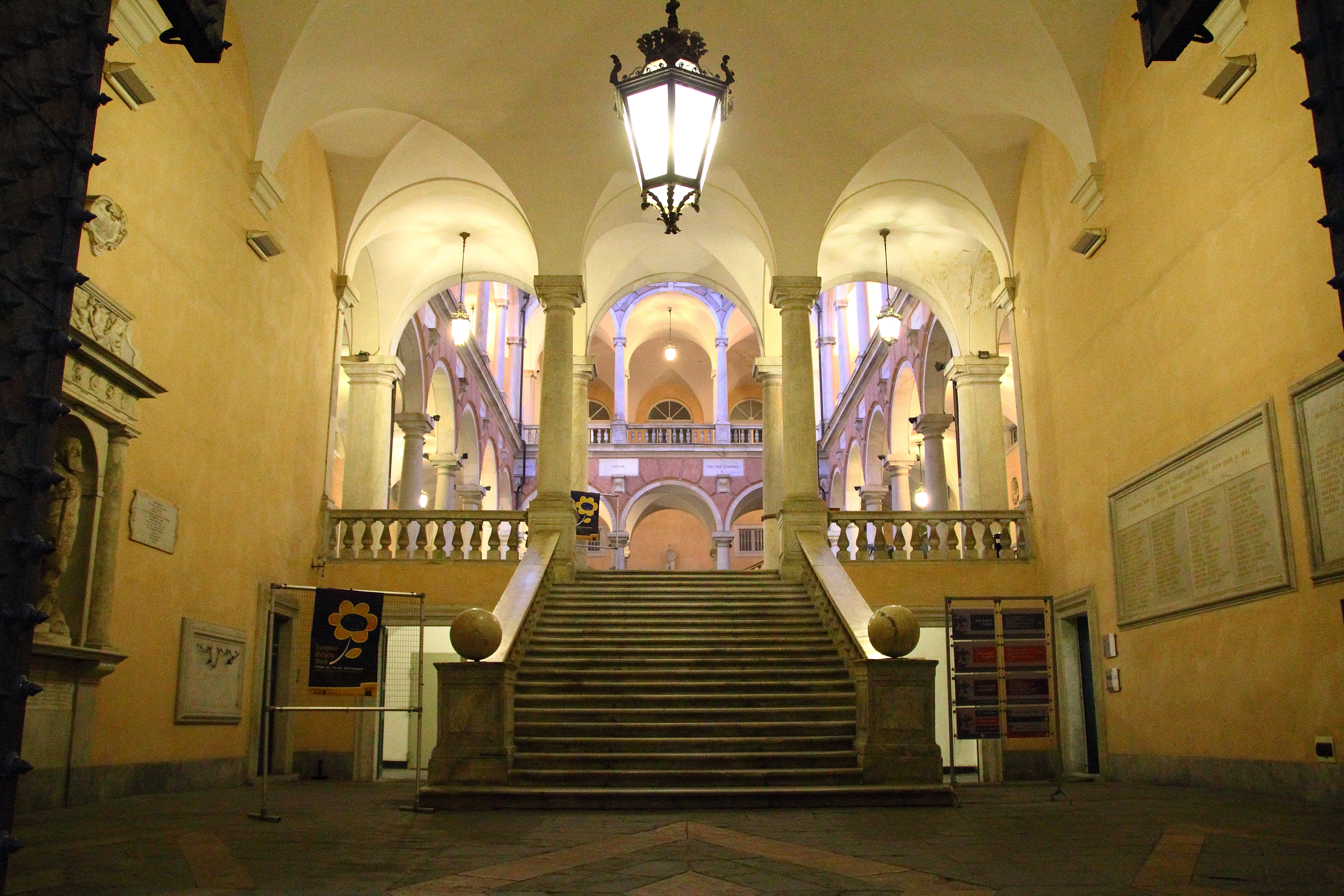
Stairway

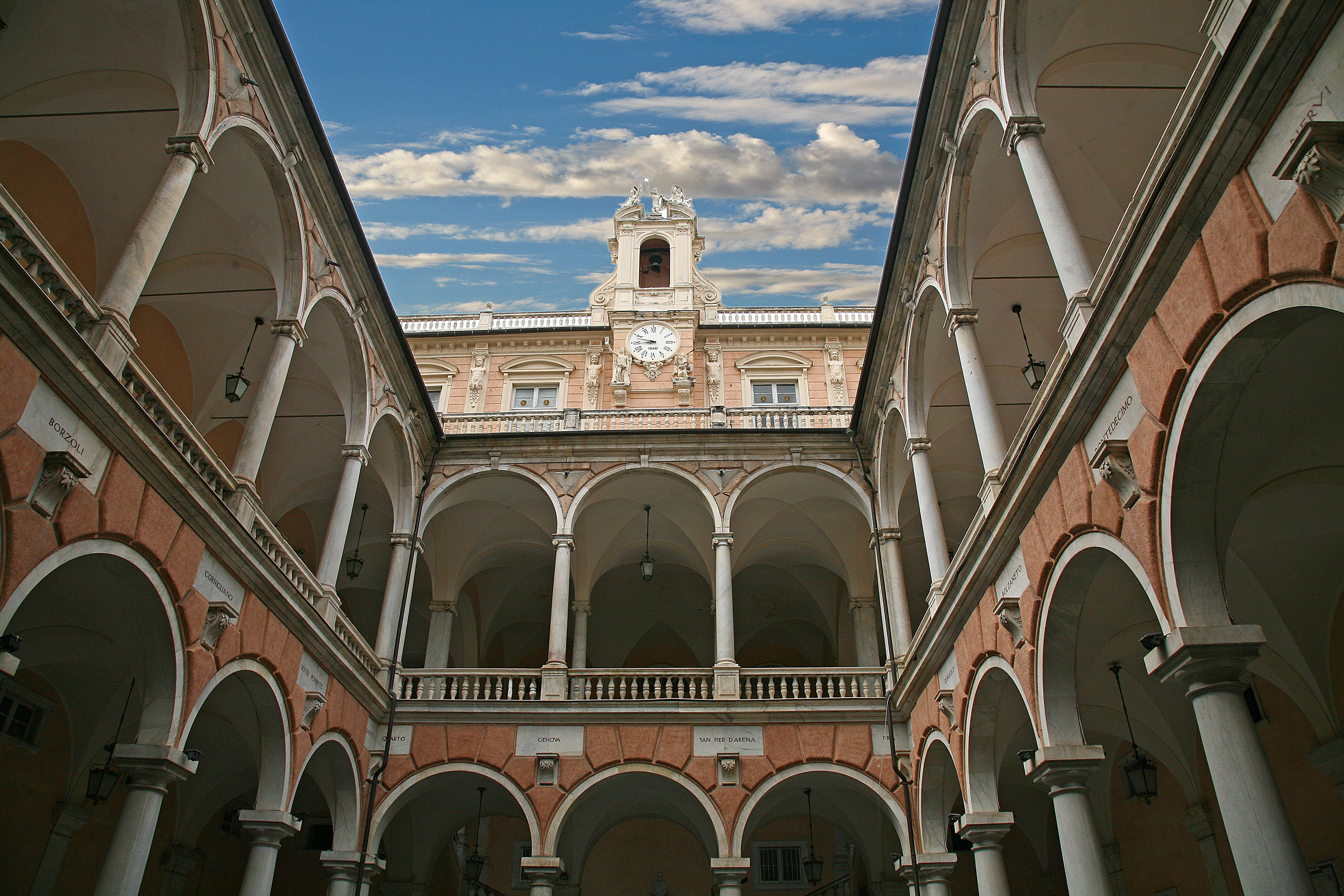
Rectangular two-floor courtyard

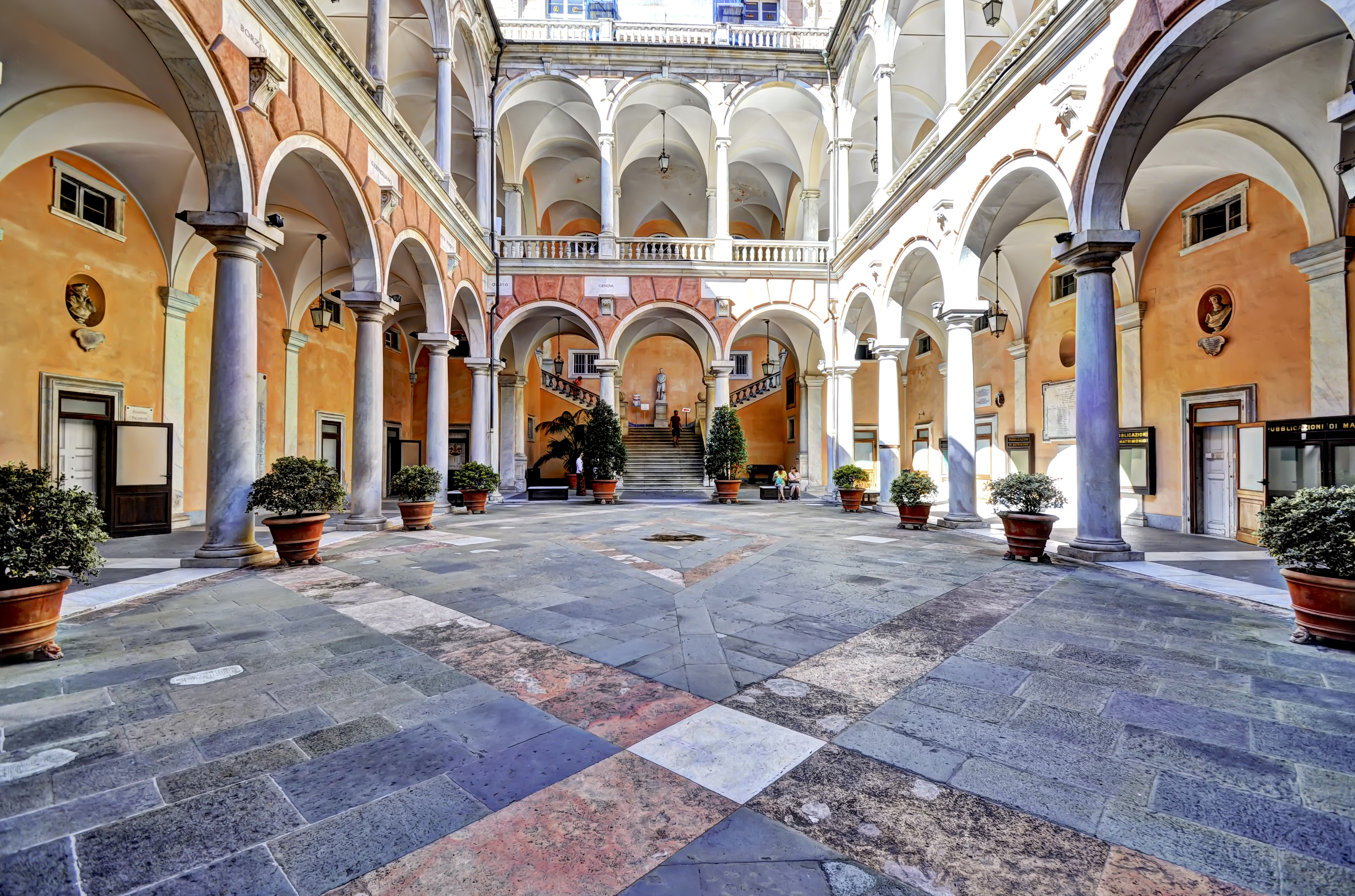
Interiors

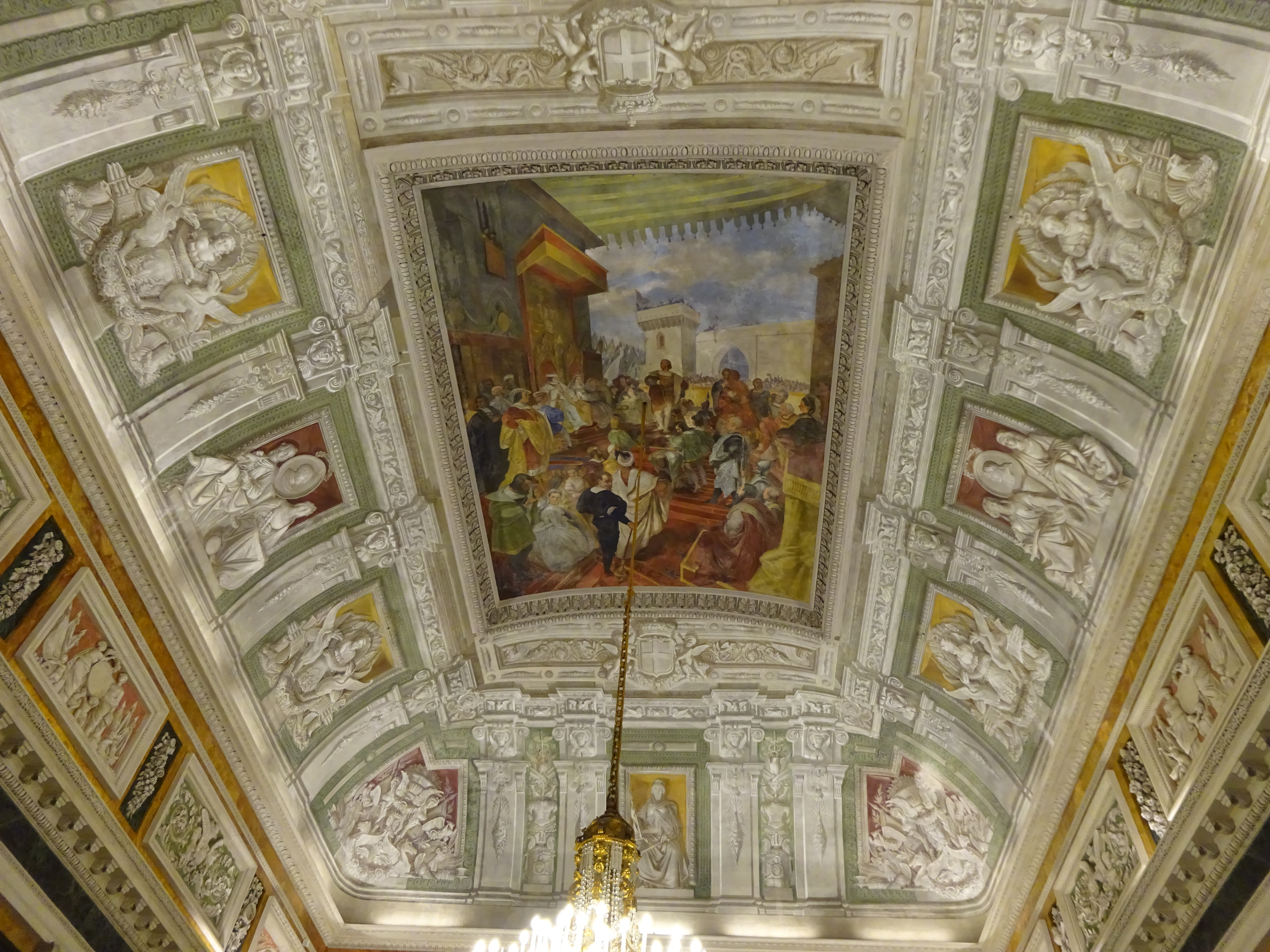
Ceiling of the Salone di Rappresentanza

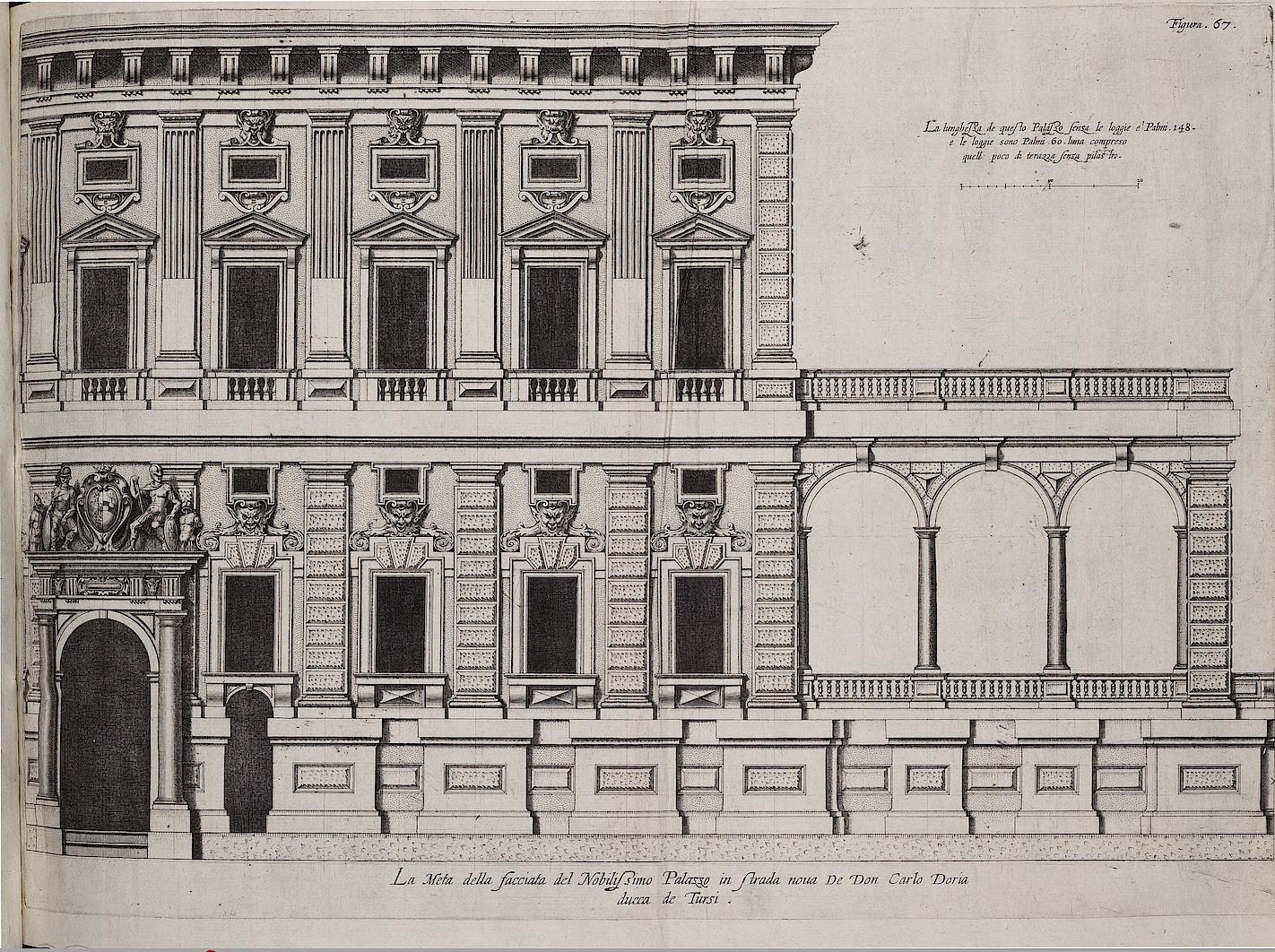
Rubens - Palaces of Genoa, 1622

== Museum rooms ==
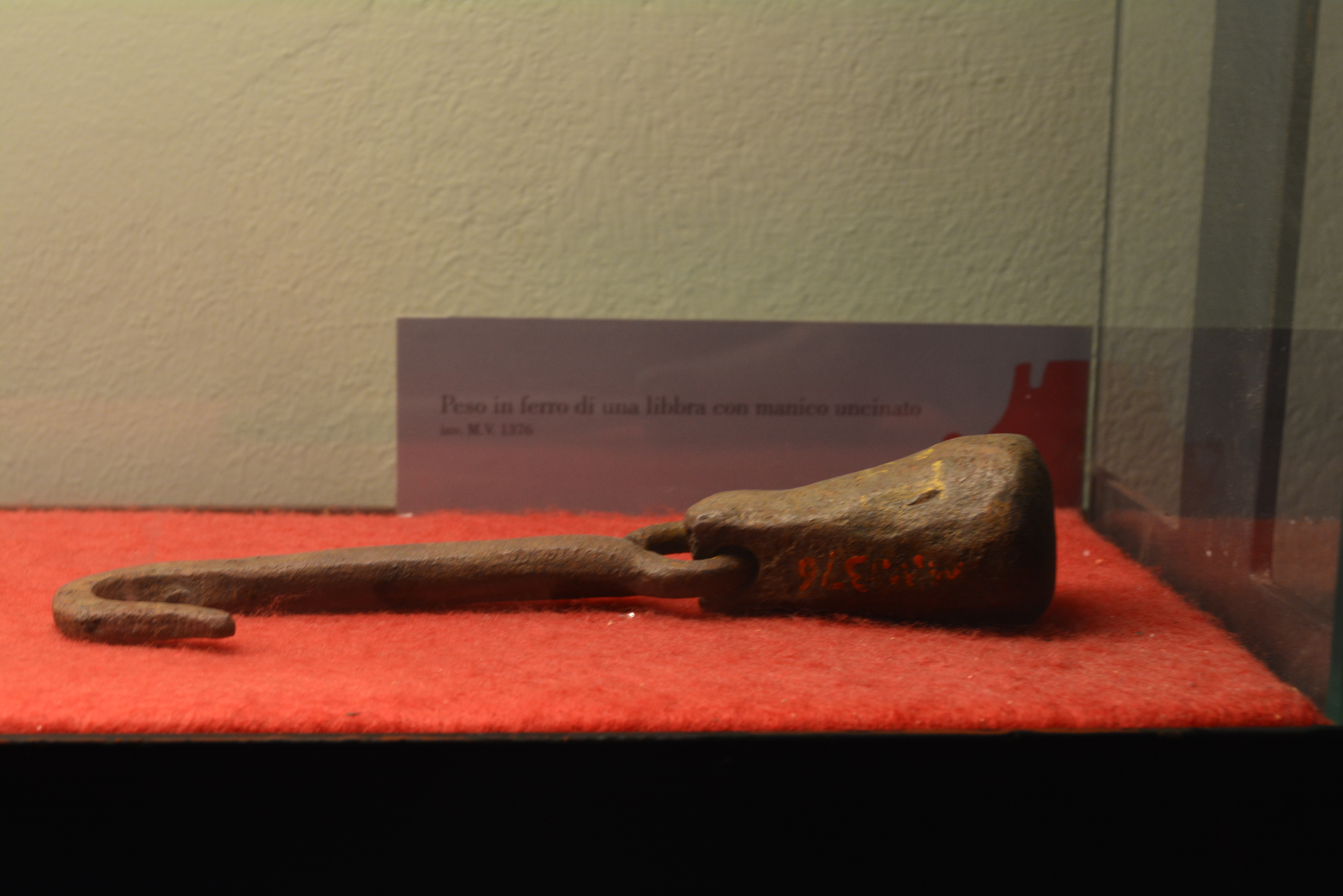
Scales

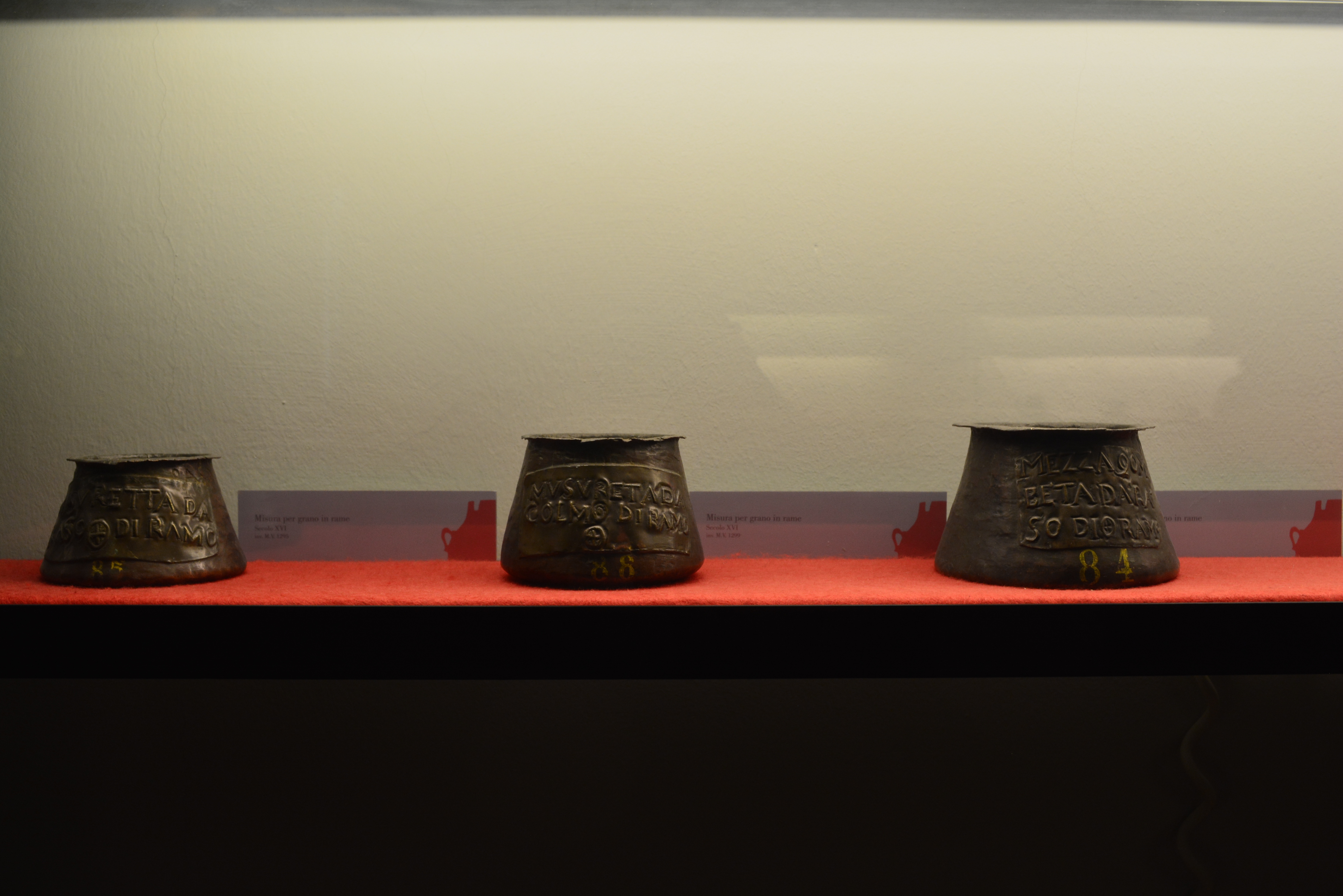
Weights

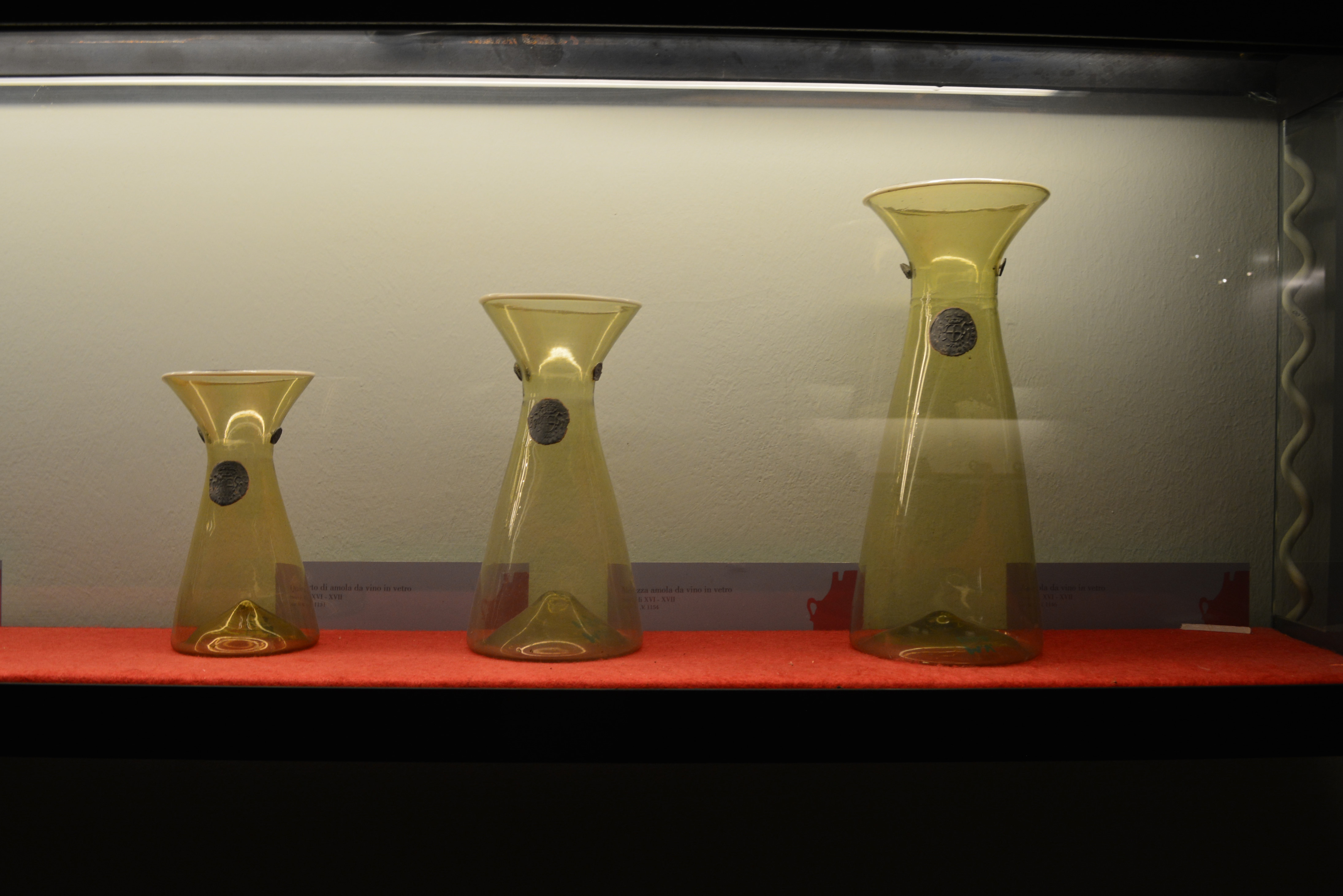
Liquid unit of measure

== See also ==
- History of Tursi

== Bibliography ==
- (in Italian) Massimo Listri, I musei di strada nuova a Genova, Allemandi, 2005, ISBN 9788842213475.
