= Palazzo Bianco =

Palace in Genoa, Italy

Coordinates: 44.412°N 8.932°E

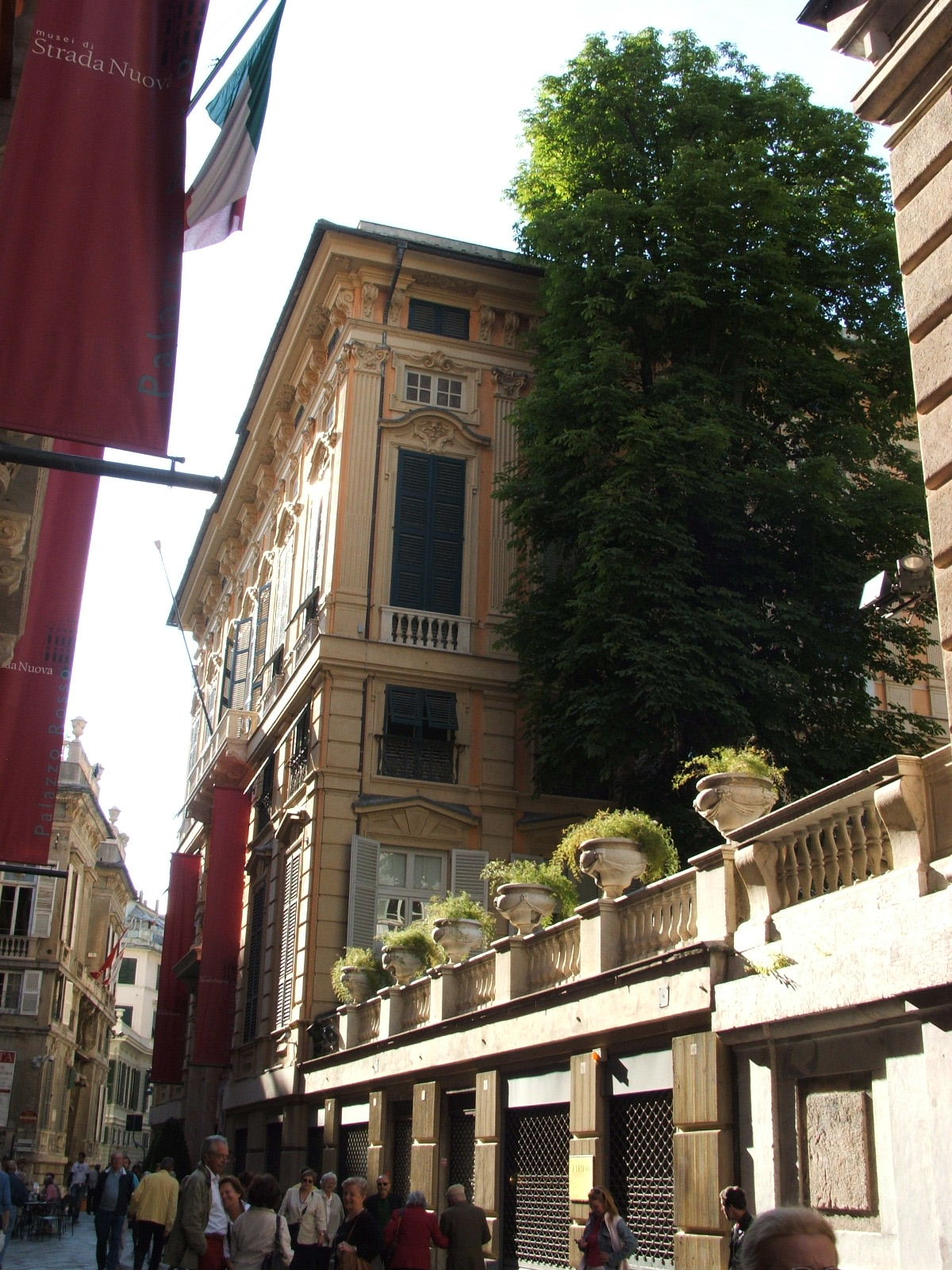
The Palazzo Bianco with the neighboring garden of the Palazzo Doria Tursi

Palazzo Bianco (English: White Palace) is one of the main buildings of the center of Genoa, Italy. It is situated at 11, via Garibaldi (known at one time as Strada Nuova, and before that, Via Aurea). It is one of the Palazzi dei Rolli, but it is not listed by UNESCO as World Heritage Site.

It contains the Gallery of the White Palace, one of the larger city art galleries, and together with those of its neighbors Palazzo Rosso and Palazzo Doria Tursi, it forms part of the Strada Nuova Museums, a cluster of museums at that end of the street.

== History ==
Constructed between 1530 and 1540 by Luca Grimaldi, a member of the House of Grimaldi, one of the most important Genoese families, in 1658 the palace passed into the possession of the De Franchi Toso family, and in 1711 it was given by its inheritor Federico de Franchi Toso, to Maria Durazzo Brignole-Sale, his main creditor.

The new owners, between 1714 and 1716, carried out a decisive restoration of the building, adapting it to the tastes of the age. It subsequently earned the name White for the clear color of its exterior decoration.

In 1899, Maria Brignole Sale, the Duchess of Galliera and the last member of the family, divested the palace to become municipal property and thus destined it to become a public gallery.

== Gallery ==
"For the formation of a public gallery": with these words, in her testament of 1884, the Duchess dedicated the Gallery of the Palace as a public space, with the intention to increase its collection yet further. This constituted the first nucleus of the civic museum.

After 1887, the gallery was enriched by the purchase of numerous private collections. It has since benefited from a transformation due to reordering of the collections and the post-war reconstruction of the palace, curated by Orlando Grosso, Caterina Marcenaro and the architect Franco Albini, and from the inward transfer of sculpture and fresco from other museums and galleries.

The gallery offers a panorama of European painting from the 12th century to the 17th century, with a large prevalence of Genoese, Flemish, French and Spanish painters. Of the 13th and 16th century, works are shown by authors such as Barnaba da Modena, Ludovico Brea and Luca Cambiaso (including La Madonna della candela). 16th-century paintings include work by Paolo Veronese from the Venetian school, and Filippino Lippi of Florence. Dutch and Flemish paintings from the 16th to 18th century feature Rubens (including Venus and Mars) and Van Dyck (including Vertummo and Pomona). Notable Spanish artists of the 17th century included are Zurbarán, Murillo and Ribera.

The activity of the Genoese painters of the 17th and 18th centuries is documented from the works of Giovanni Benedetto Castiglione, Giovanni Andrea Ansaldo, Bernardo Strozzi, Valerio Castello, Domenico Piola, Paolo Girolamo Piola, Gregorio De Ferrari and Alessandro Magnasco.

== Other important paintings in the collection ==
- Caravaggio – Ecce Homo
- Hans Memling – Christ Blessing (Ecce Homo)
- Gerard David – Polittico della Cervara (Polyptych of the Cervara)
