= Euroflora =

Exhibition of flowers and ornamental plants

- Status: Active
- Venue: Fiera di Genova; Parchi di Nervi
- Location: Genoa
- Country: Italy
- Inaugurated: 1966; 60 years ago
- Next event: 2028
- Attendance: 562.000 (2006) ▼430.000 (2011) ▼280,000 (2018) ▼170,000 (2022) ▲200,000 (2025)
- Organizer: Genova Floralies; Comune di Genova
- Website: Euroflora 2025

Euroflora is an exhibition of flowers and ornamental plants. It represents one of the main events that take place in the Mediterranean and the world on research to plant hybridization, cut flowers, potted plants, arboriculture, gardening, and landscaping. Euroflora is organised by Genova Floralies with the support of the municipality of Genoa. It is recognised by the International Association of Horticultural Producers (AIPH) and is also part of the International Association of Flower Shows (AIF) founded in 2005, together with the flower shows in Ghent and Nantes.

== History ==
Euroflora takes place every five years, with the first edition being in 1966. Among the main themes of the event is biodiversity.

Euroflora’s conception and planning was based on the prominent flower show of Ghent, on the initiative of Carlo Pastorino, then president of the Ente Fiera di Genova (transl. Office of Genoese Fairs). The project involved both Genoese and Ligurian floriculturists and was authorised for development on 27 August 1965 by the AIPH, led by its president Emile Debroise. Floriculturists and botanical experts from Italy and the rest of the world exhibit their plants at the venue, which spans more than 100,000 square meters.

After the 2018 and 2022 editions at Parchi di Nervi, Euroflora returned to its original location, at Fiera di Genova. Now part of the Waterfront di Levante, a renovation project of both the Fiera di Genova and all the surrounding areas, created by the architect Renzo Piano.

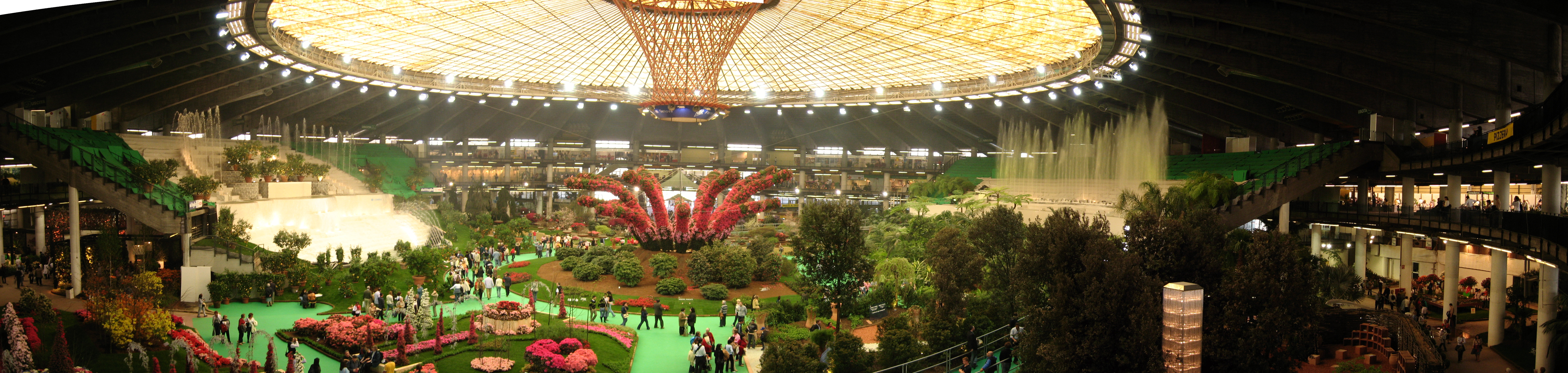
Fiera di Genova, Pavilion S

=== Euroflora 1966 ===
Fiera di Genova, Genoa, 30 April – 8 May 1966

In this inaugural edition the actress Grace Kelly, Princess of Monaco, and Prince Rainier III of Monaco were attendant.

=== Euroflora 1971 ===
Fiera di Genova, Genoa, 17–25 April 1971

=== Euroflora 1976 ===
Fiera di Genova, Genoa, 24 April – 2 May 1976

=== Euroflora 1981 ===
Fiera di Genova, Genoa, 25 April – 3 May 1981

=== Euroflora 1986 ===
Fiera di Genova, Genoa, 25 April – 4 May 1986

The 1986 edition was the most successful, with a total of 730,000 visitors. 250,000 visitors were present at the opening of the exhibition, with over 260 exhibitors from 19 countries.

The President of the Italian Republic, Sandro Pertini, was present at this edition. The Italian designer and art collector Marella Caracciolo, Gianni Agnelli's wife, also visited the event.

=== Euroflora 1991 ===
Fiera di Genova, Genoa, 20–28 April 1991

The President of the Italian Republic, Francesco Cossiga, was present at this edition.

=== Euroflora 1996 ===
Fiera di Genova, Genoa, 20–28 April 1996

The President of the Italian Republic, Oscar Luigi Scalfaro, was present at this edition with his daughter.

=== Euroflora 2001 ===
Fiera di Genova, Genoa, 21 April – 1 May 2001

=== Euroflora 2006 ===
Fiera di Genova, Genoa, 21 April – 1 May 2006

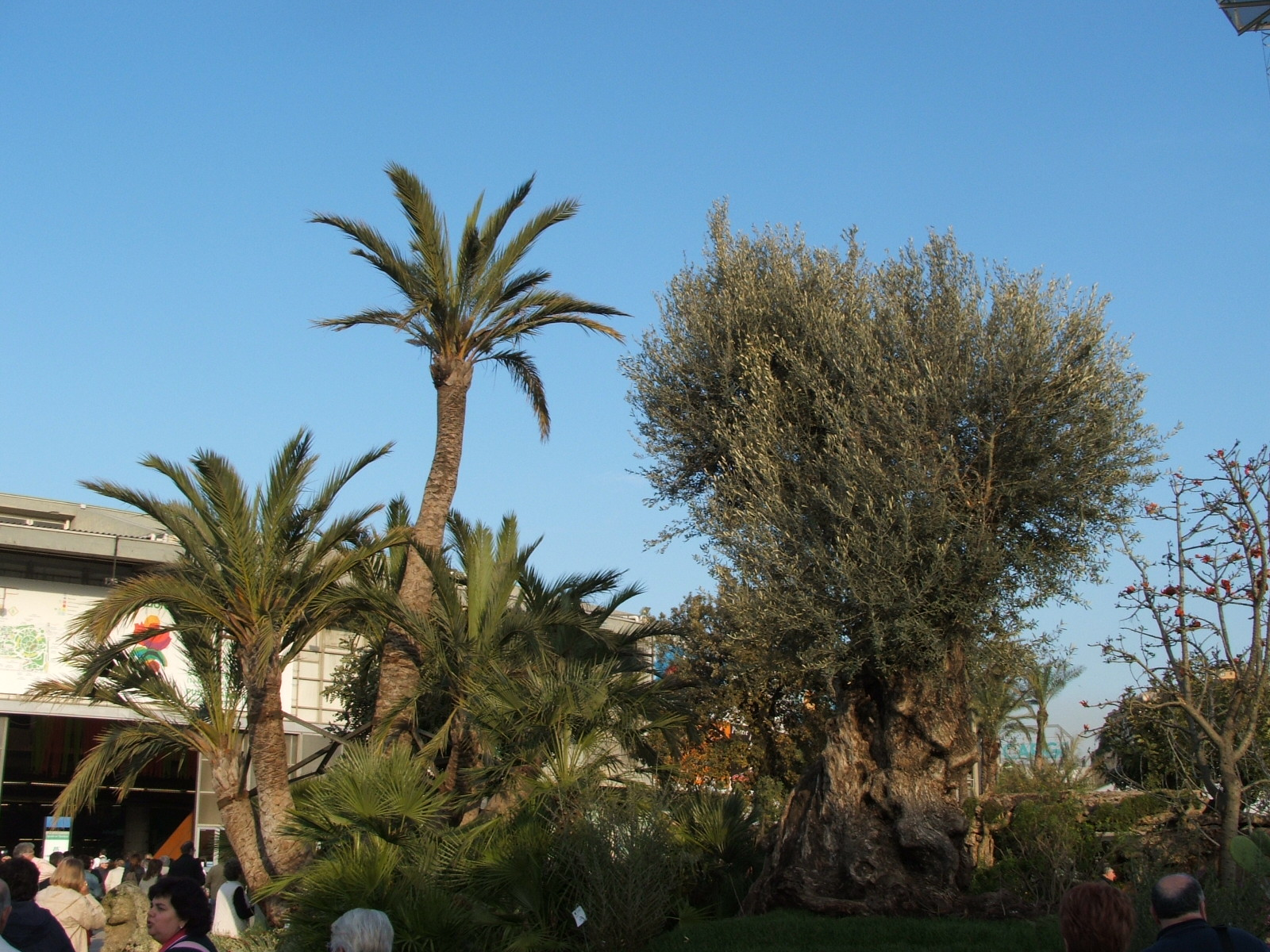

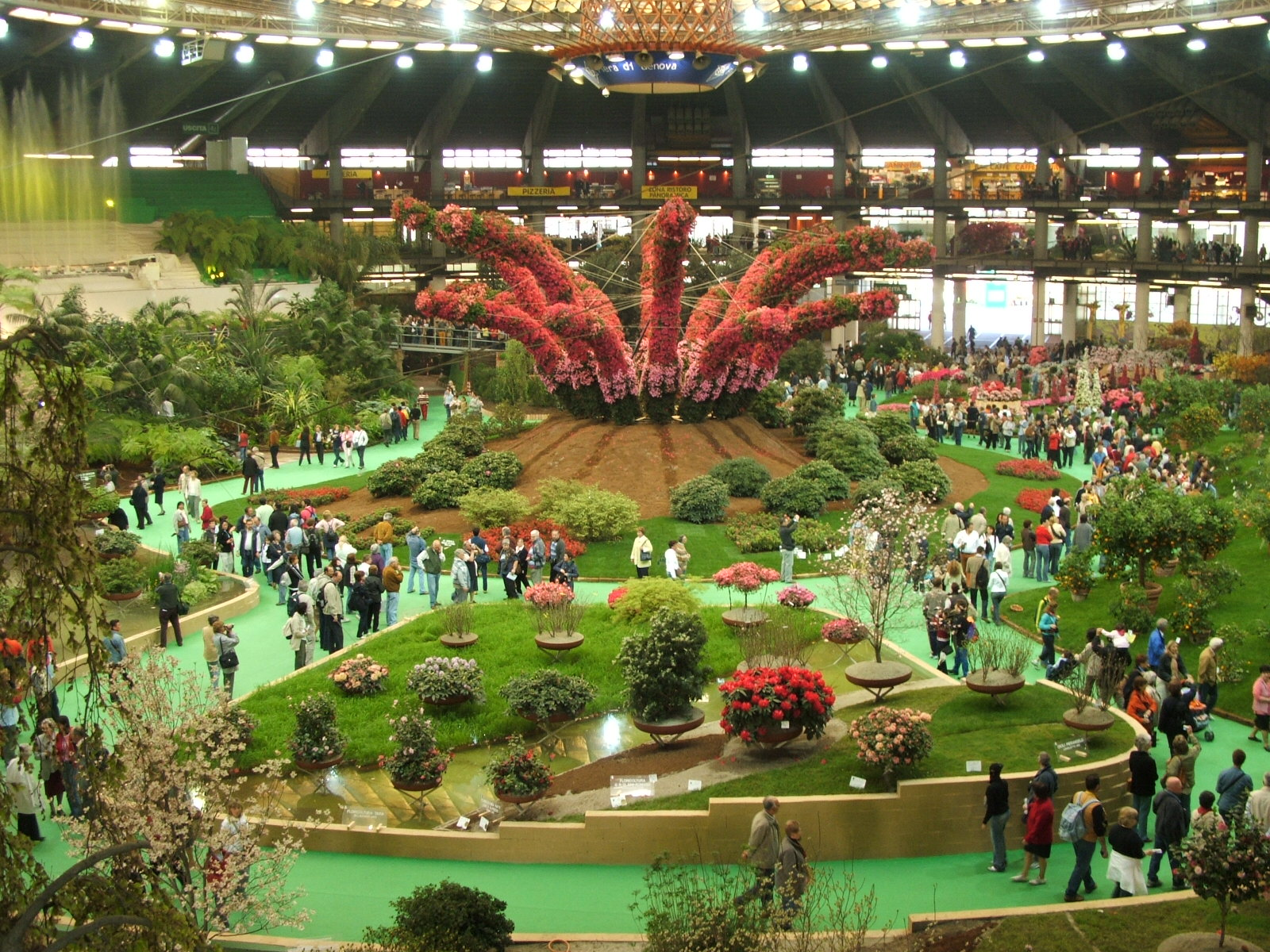

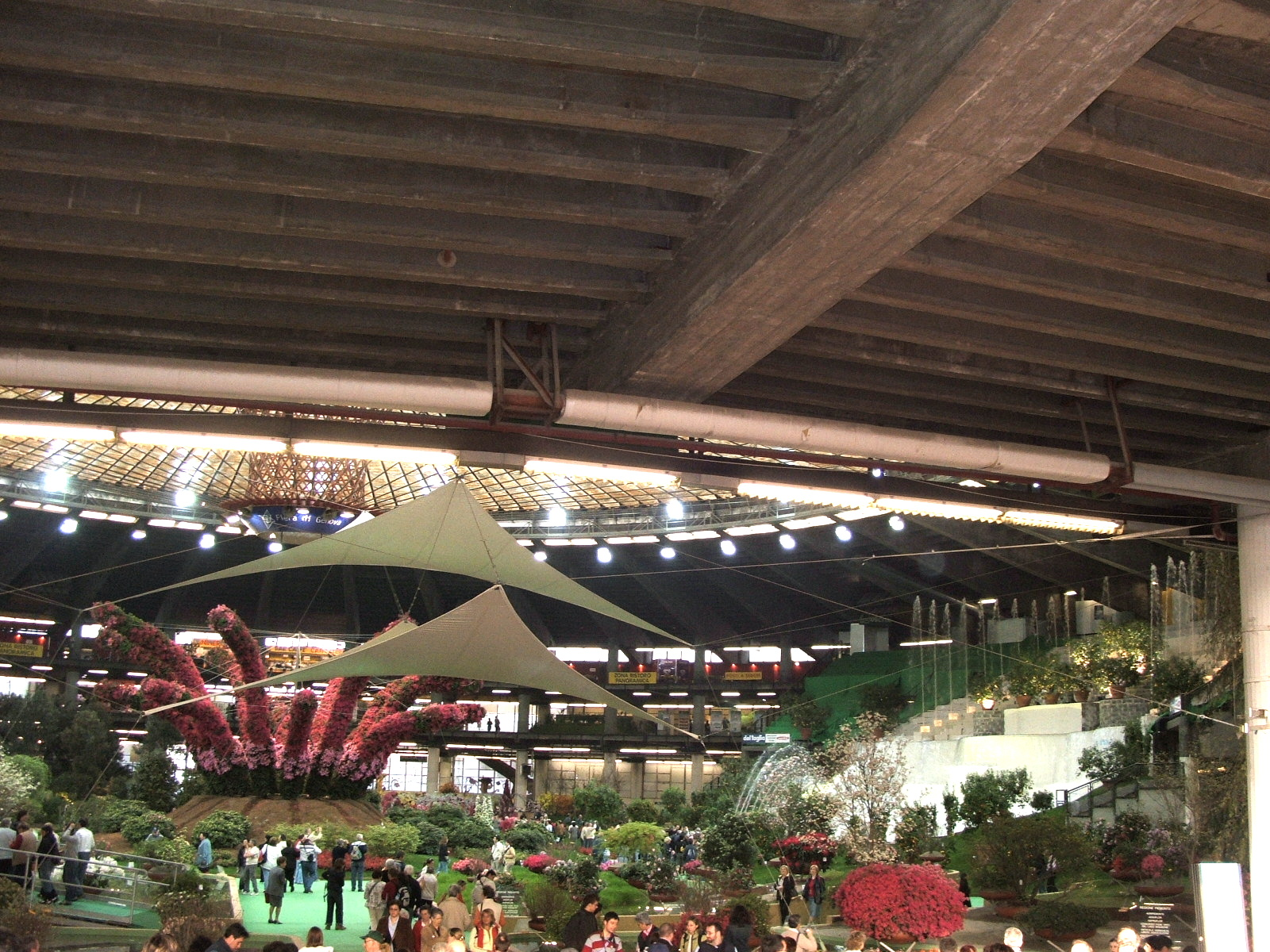

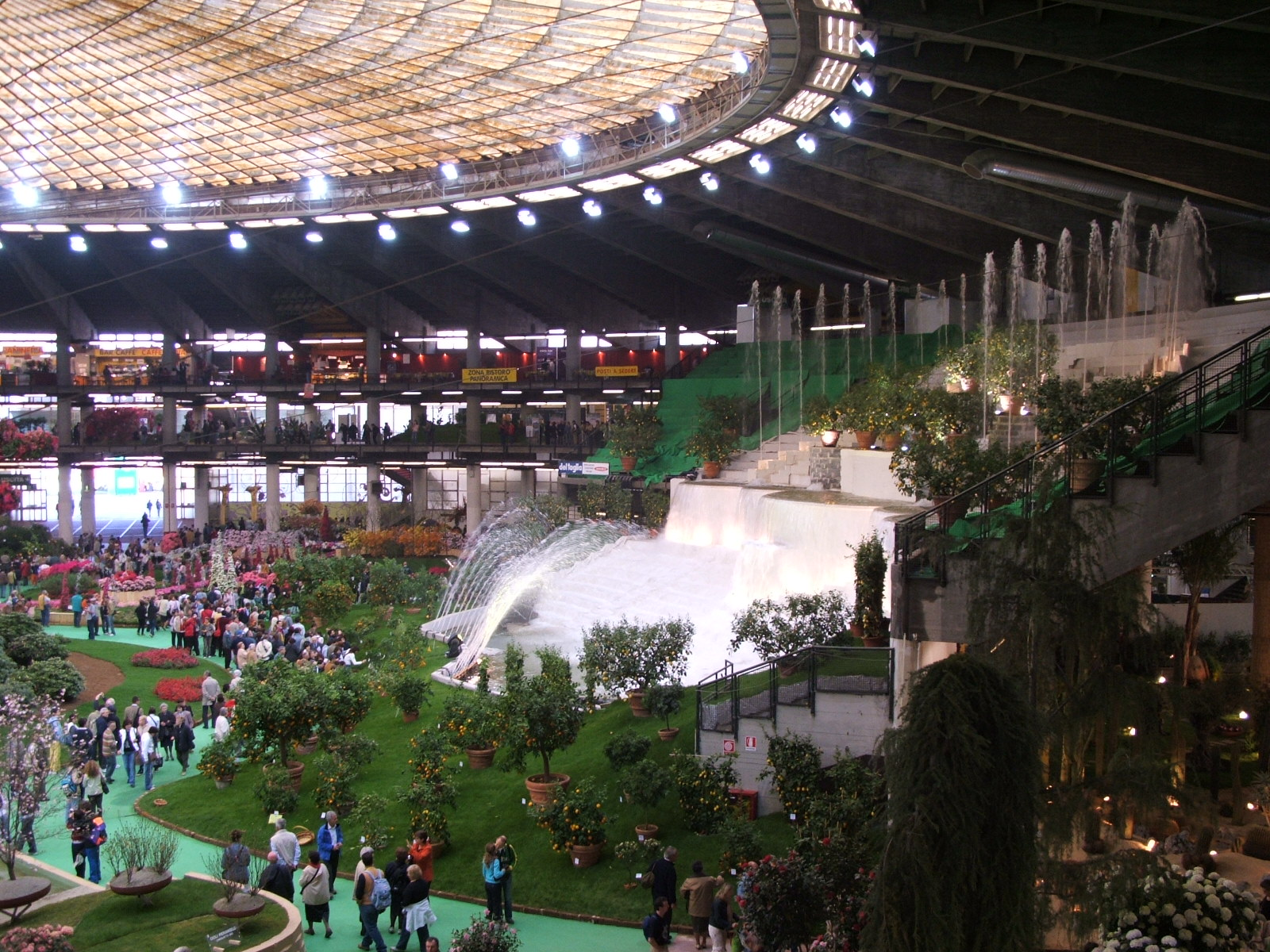

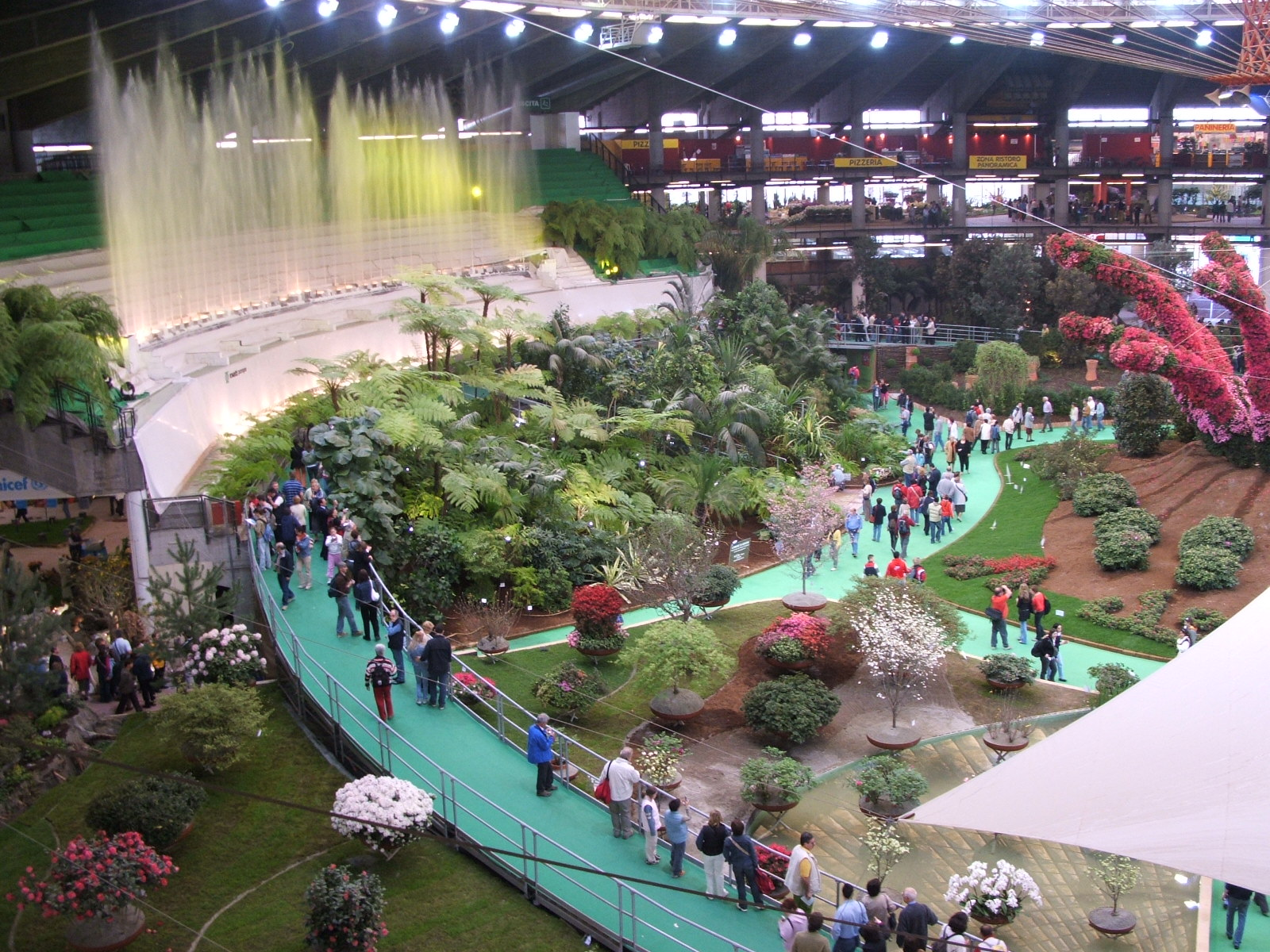

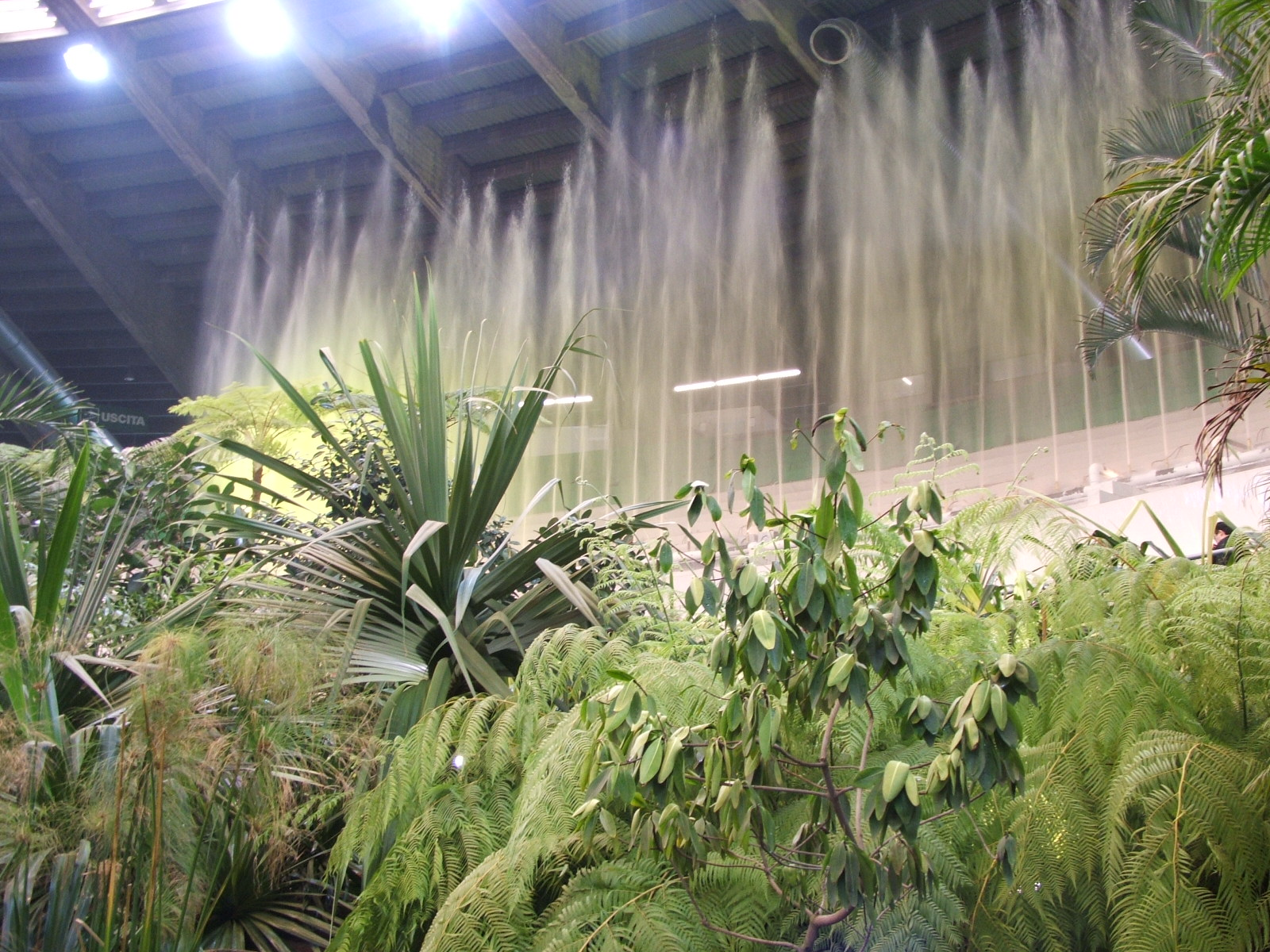

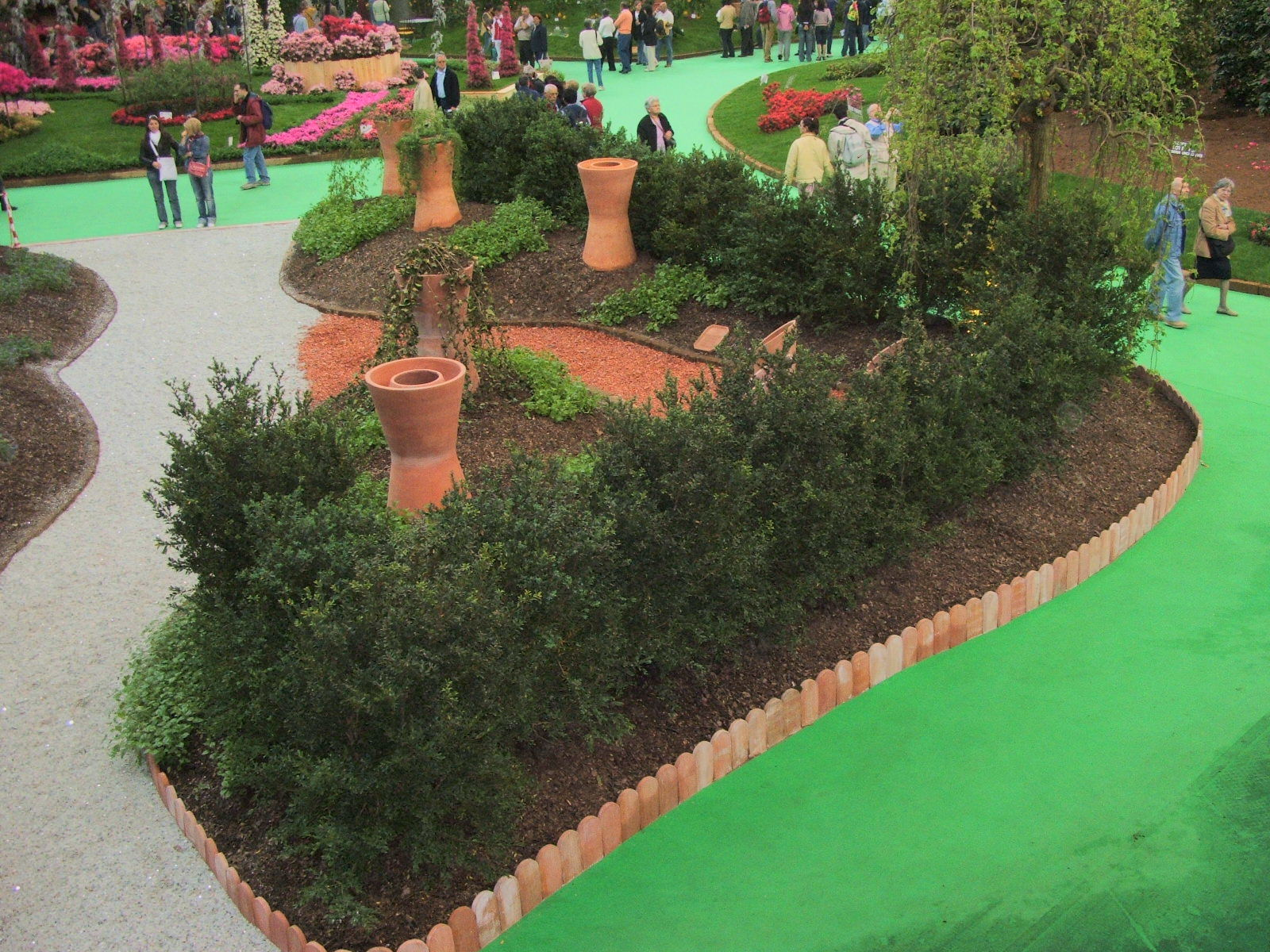

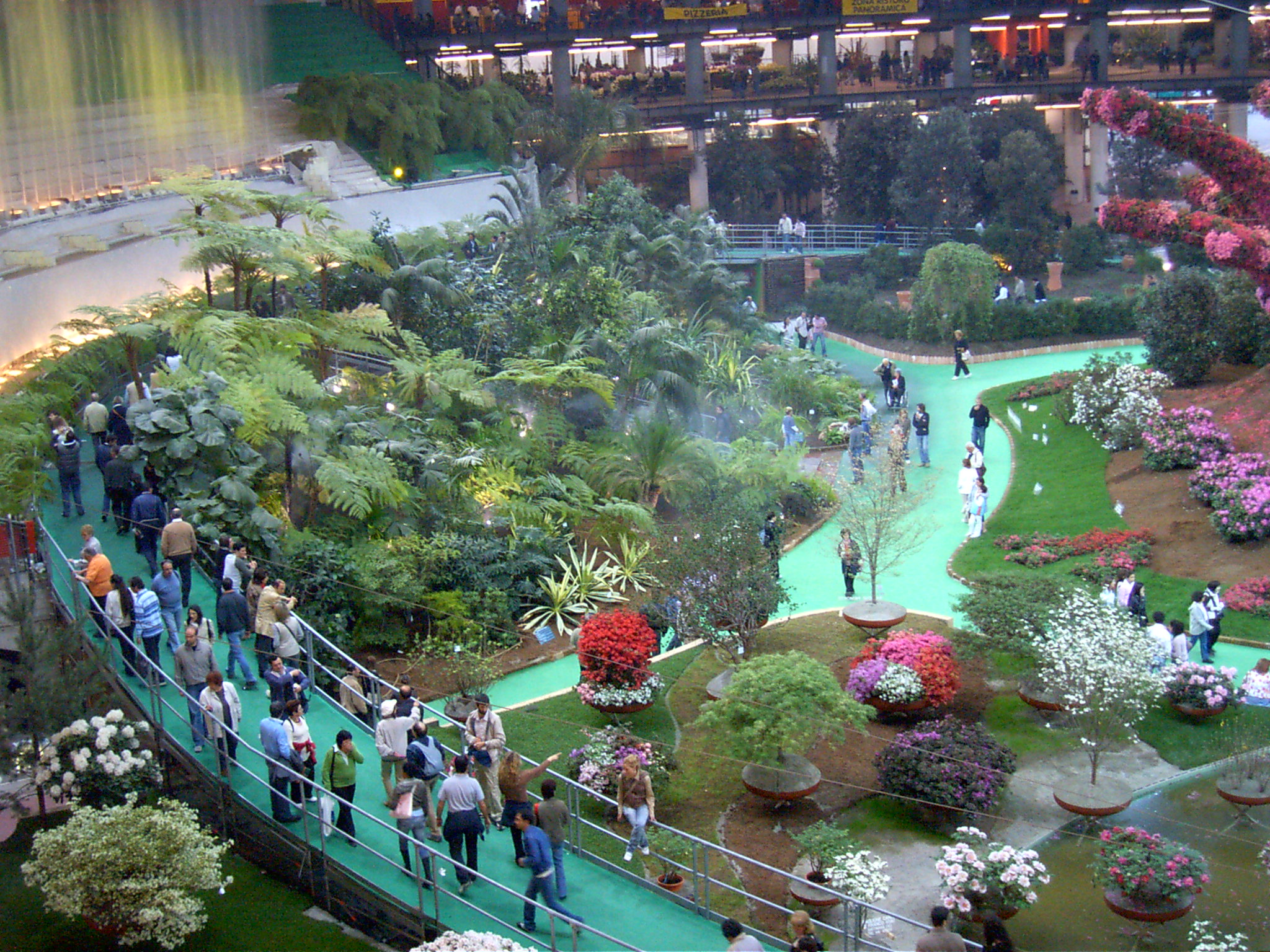

=== Euroflora 2011 ===
Fiera di Genova, Genoa, 21 April – 1 May 2011

The 2011 edition went down in history as the worst edition of Euroflora. An edition that, in some ways, received a Damnatio memoriae of the event. The edition was so unsuccessful that it almost decreed the end of the event, and the organisations involved, from that moment on, gradually postponed the next edition scheduled for 2016. The major shortcomings were more organisational and promotional, rather than floral exhibition arrangements, which led to a lower participation of the public compared to previous editions, which did not compensate for the organisational costs. The budget closed with a deficit of 650,000 euros. However, the event, less scenographic than the previous ones, was still appreciated by the public that attended. The exhibition area included exclusively that of the Fiera di Genova.

The Palasport of Genoa, or pavilion S, which hosted the most important floricultural choreographies, the very symbol of the event, was divided into four large sections and a central area, each characterized by the architecture in the landscape and an environmental biotope: the desert, the Mediterranean scrub, the lake, and the tropical forest. Furthermore, from the entrance towards the inside of the pavilion, there was a long, white, arched pergola, or tunnel, of white climbing roses, but, unfortunately, it was poorly decorated and completely failed to impress and surprise the attendees. The rose garden had not been sufficiently enhanced, and therefore did not impress the public present at the event. But this partial failure became the basis for working on improving the rose garden in the Nervi parks.

=== Euroflora 2018 ===
Parchi di Nervi, Genoa Nervi, 21 April – 6 May 2018

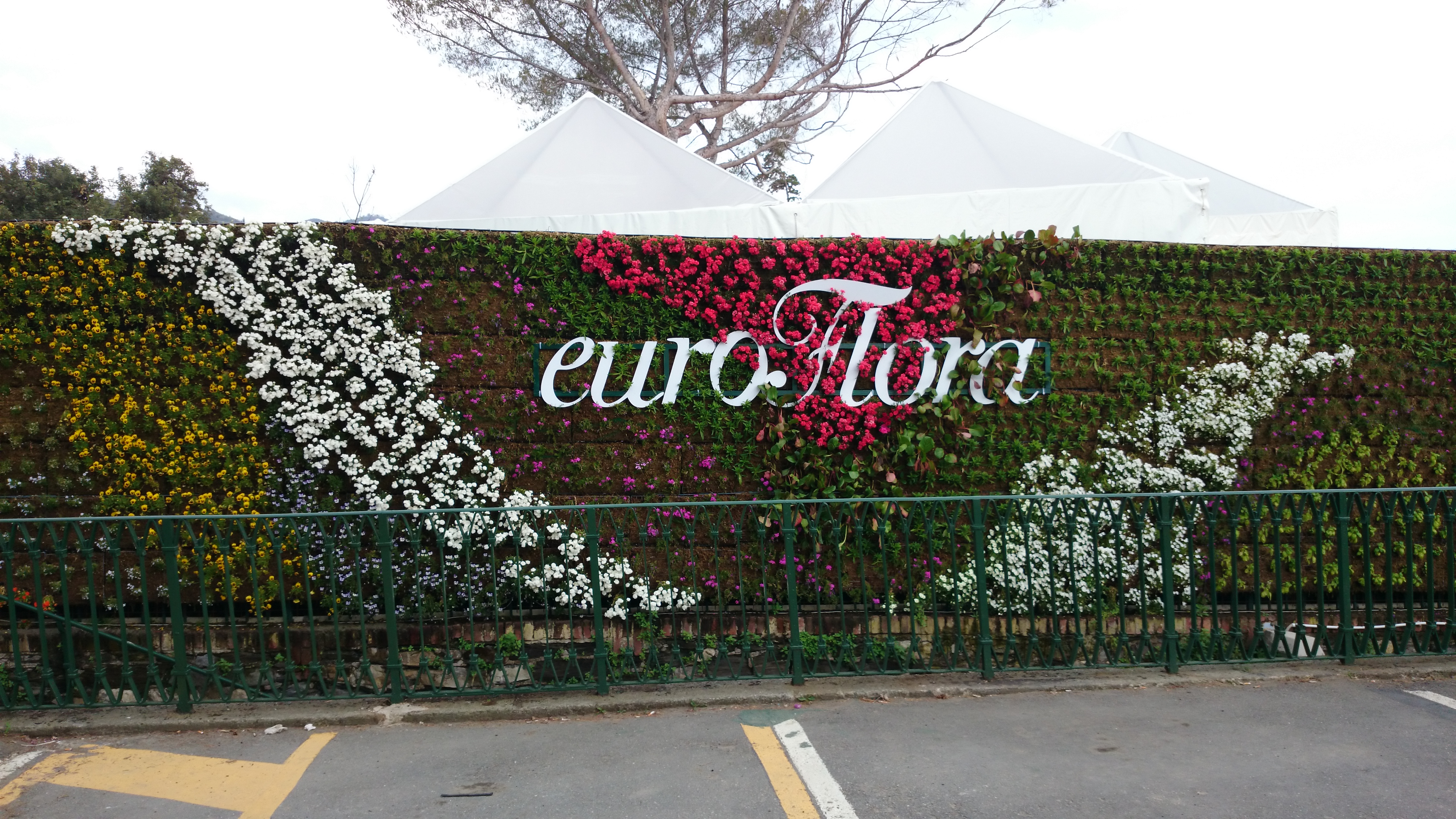

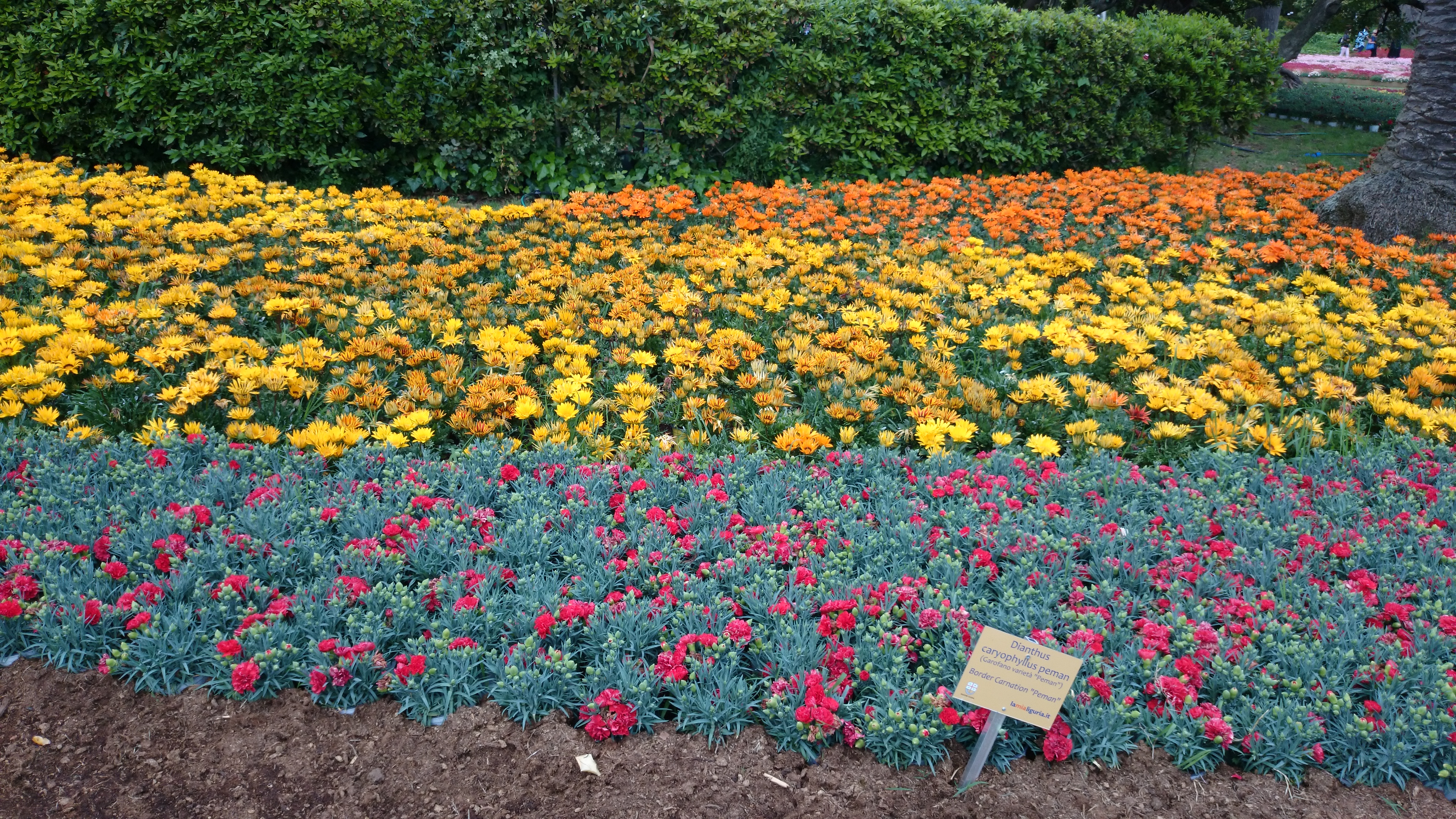

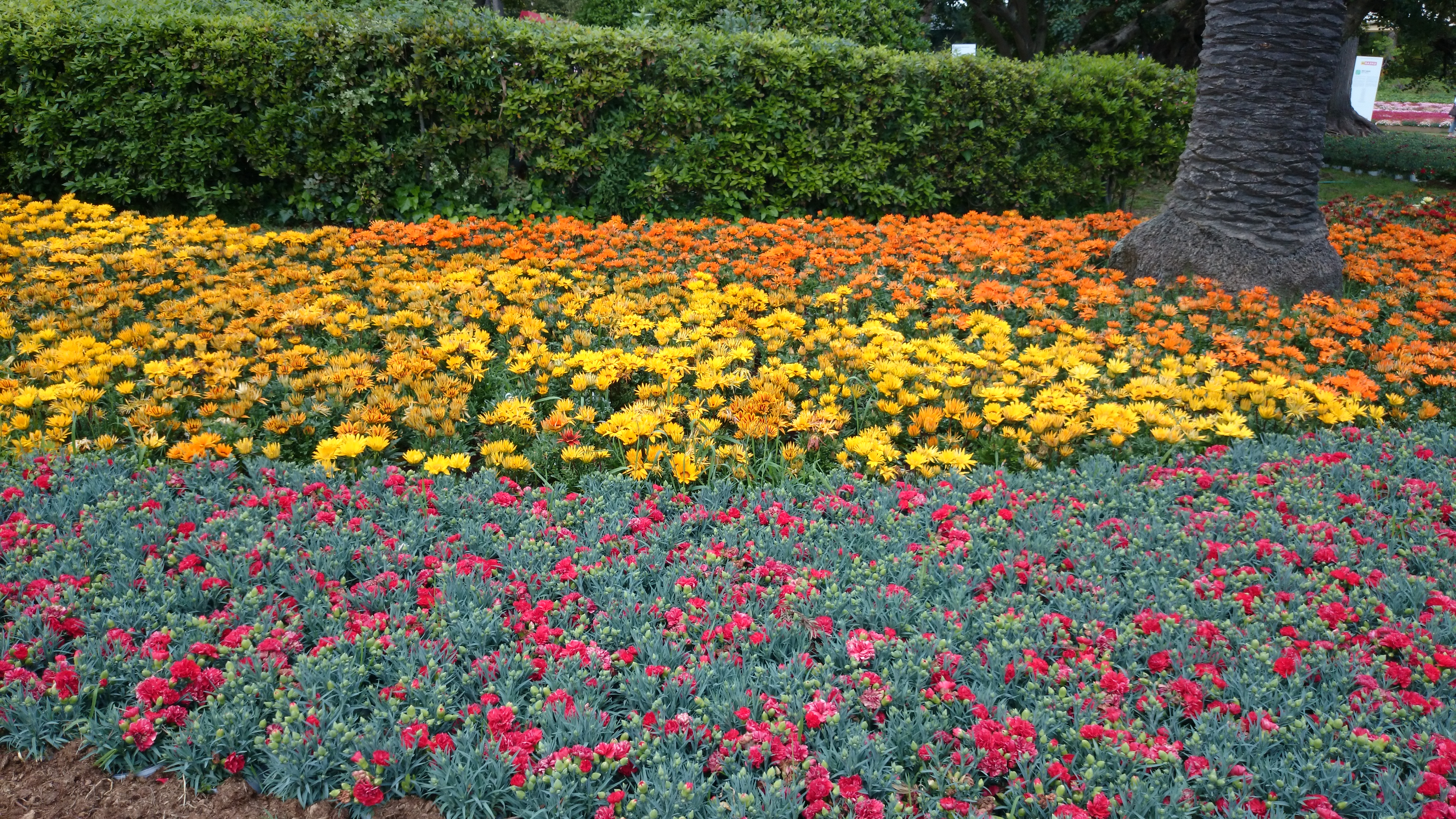

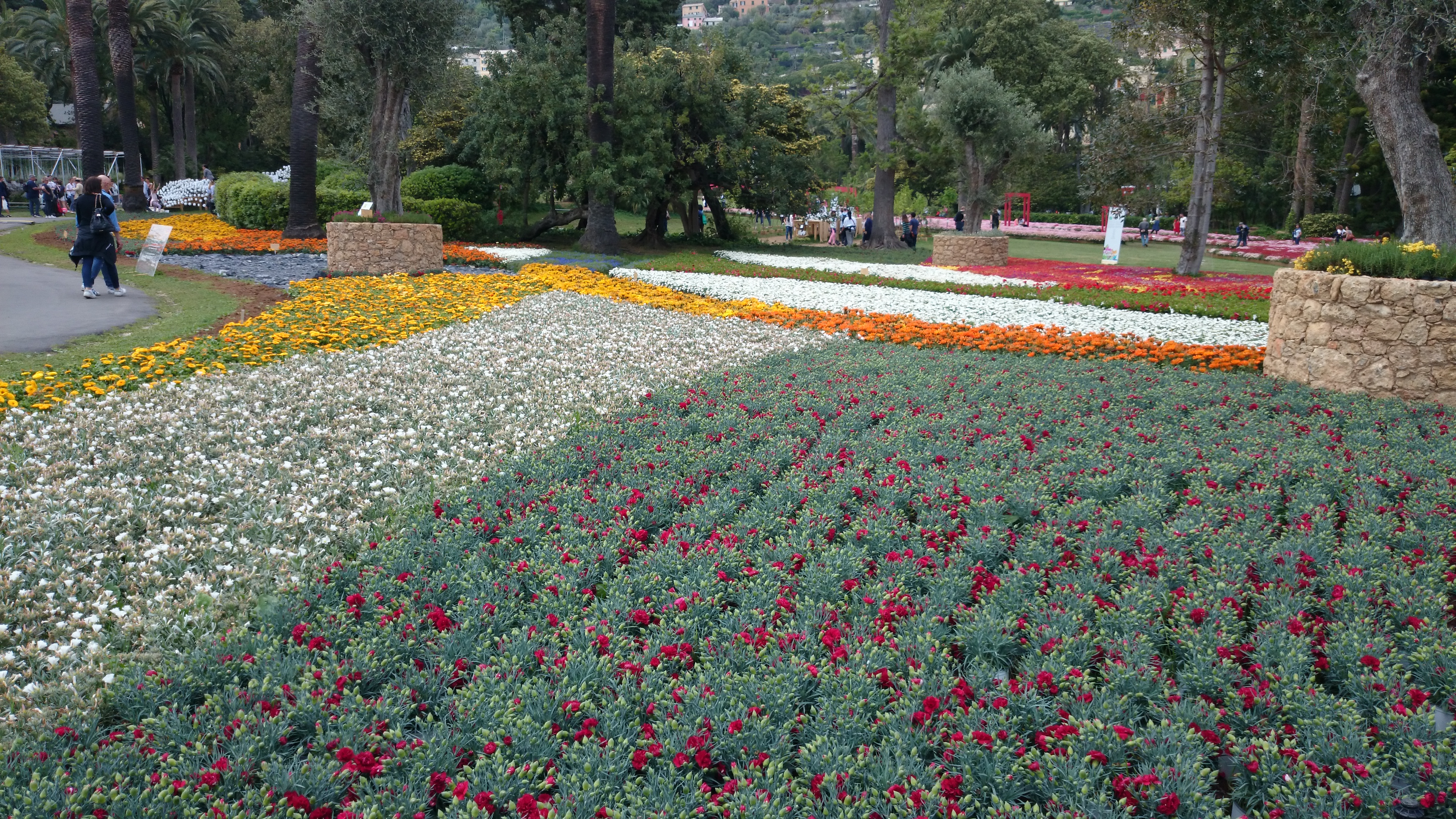

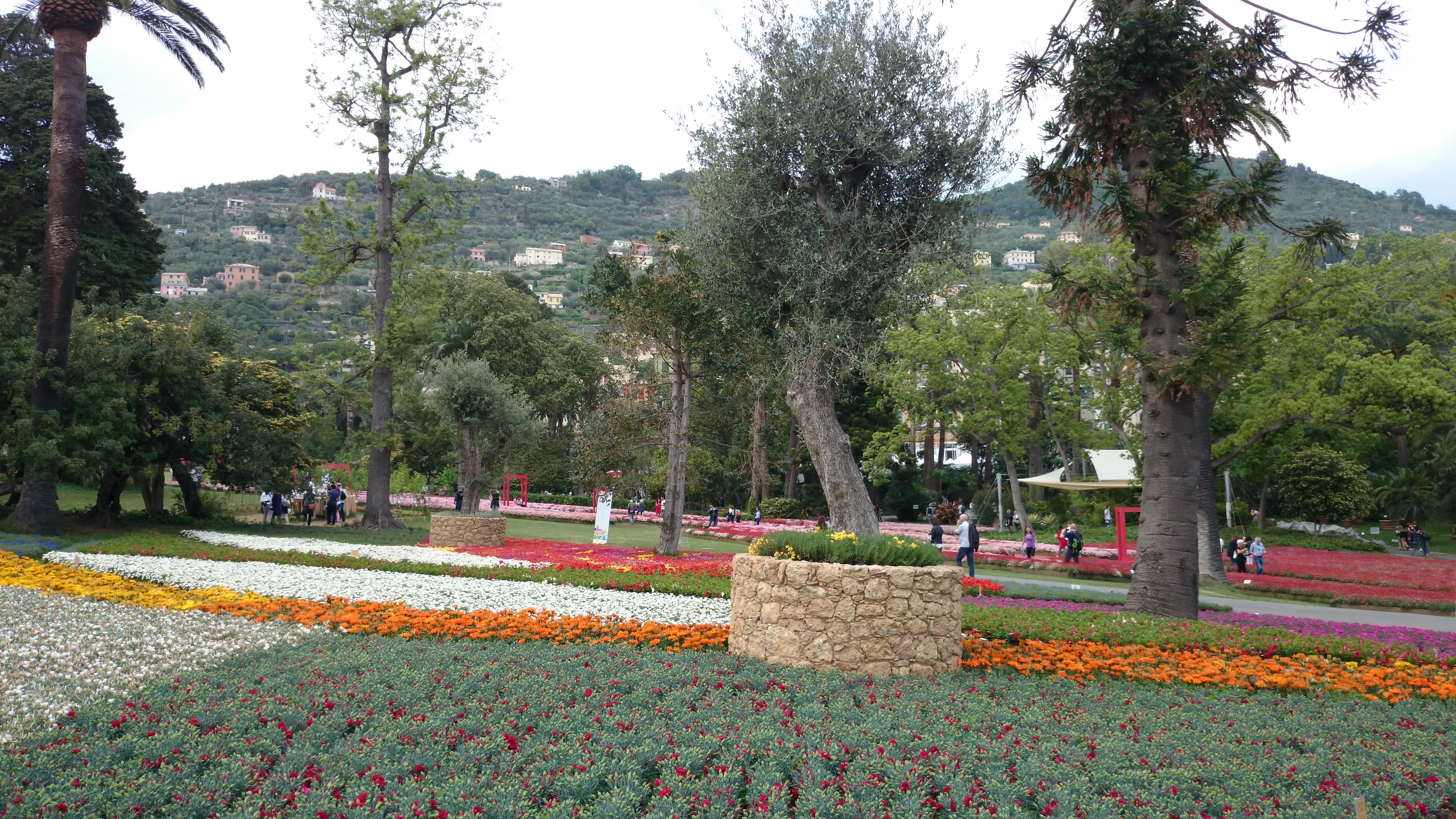

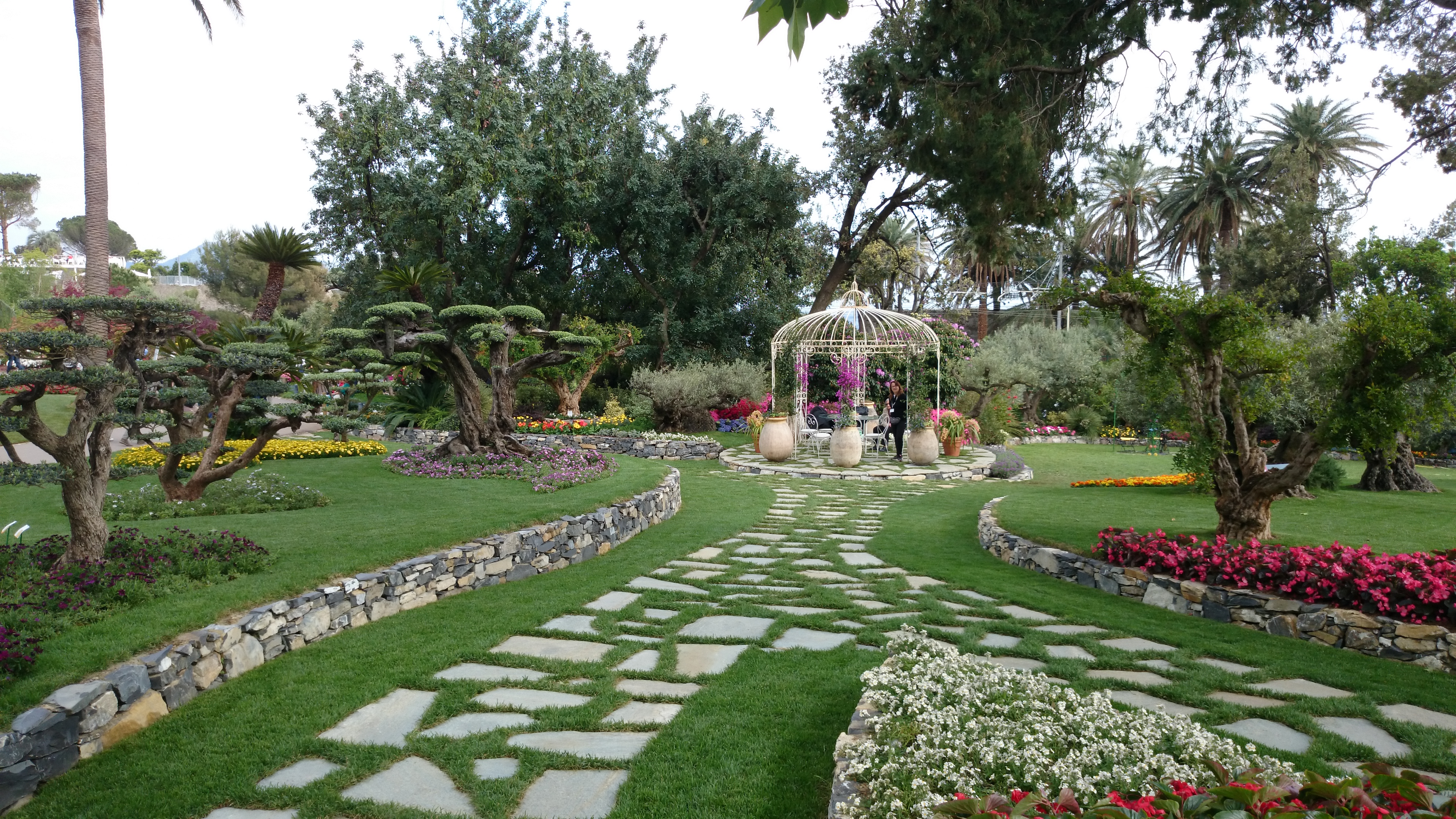

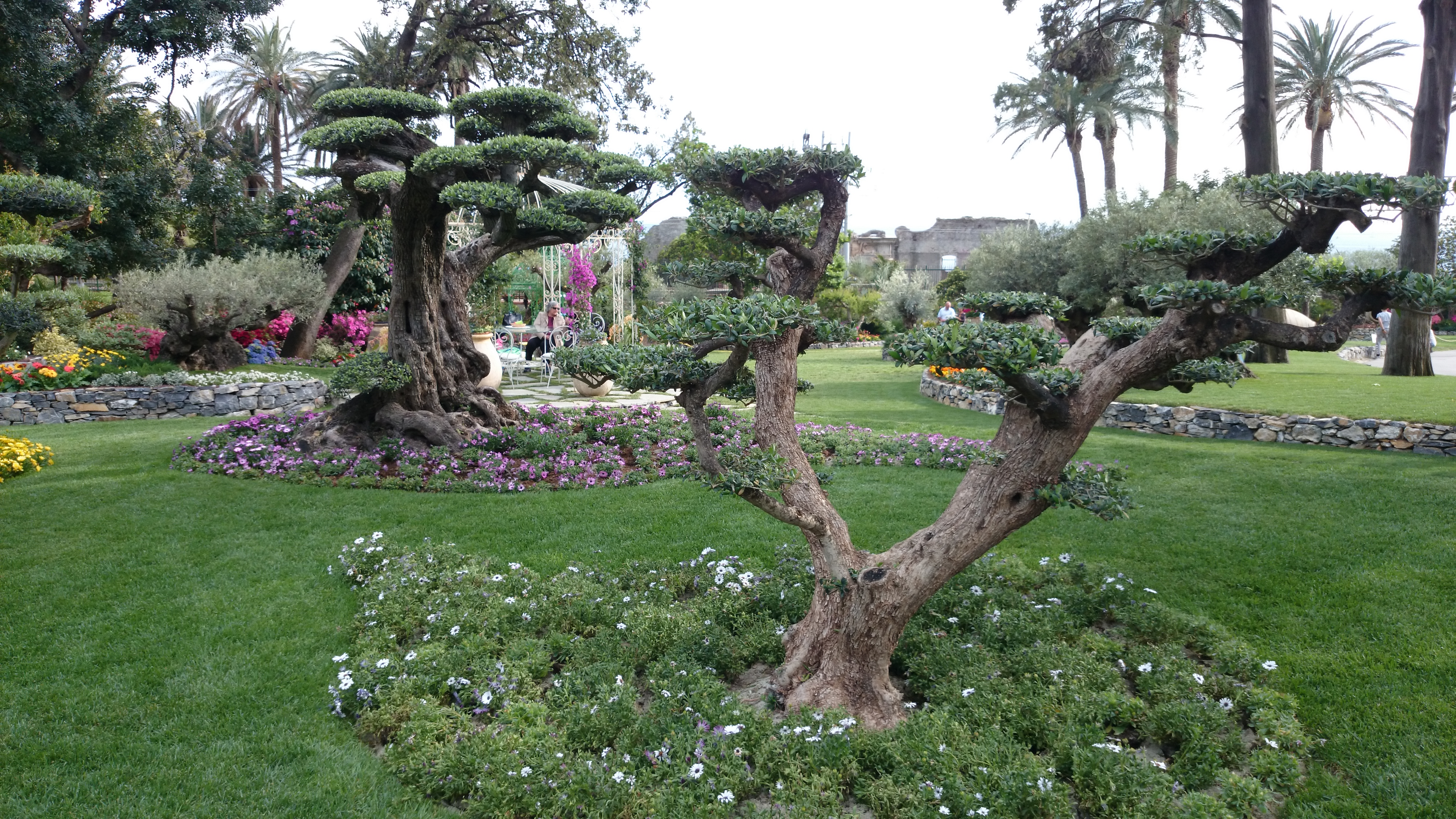

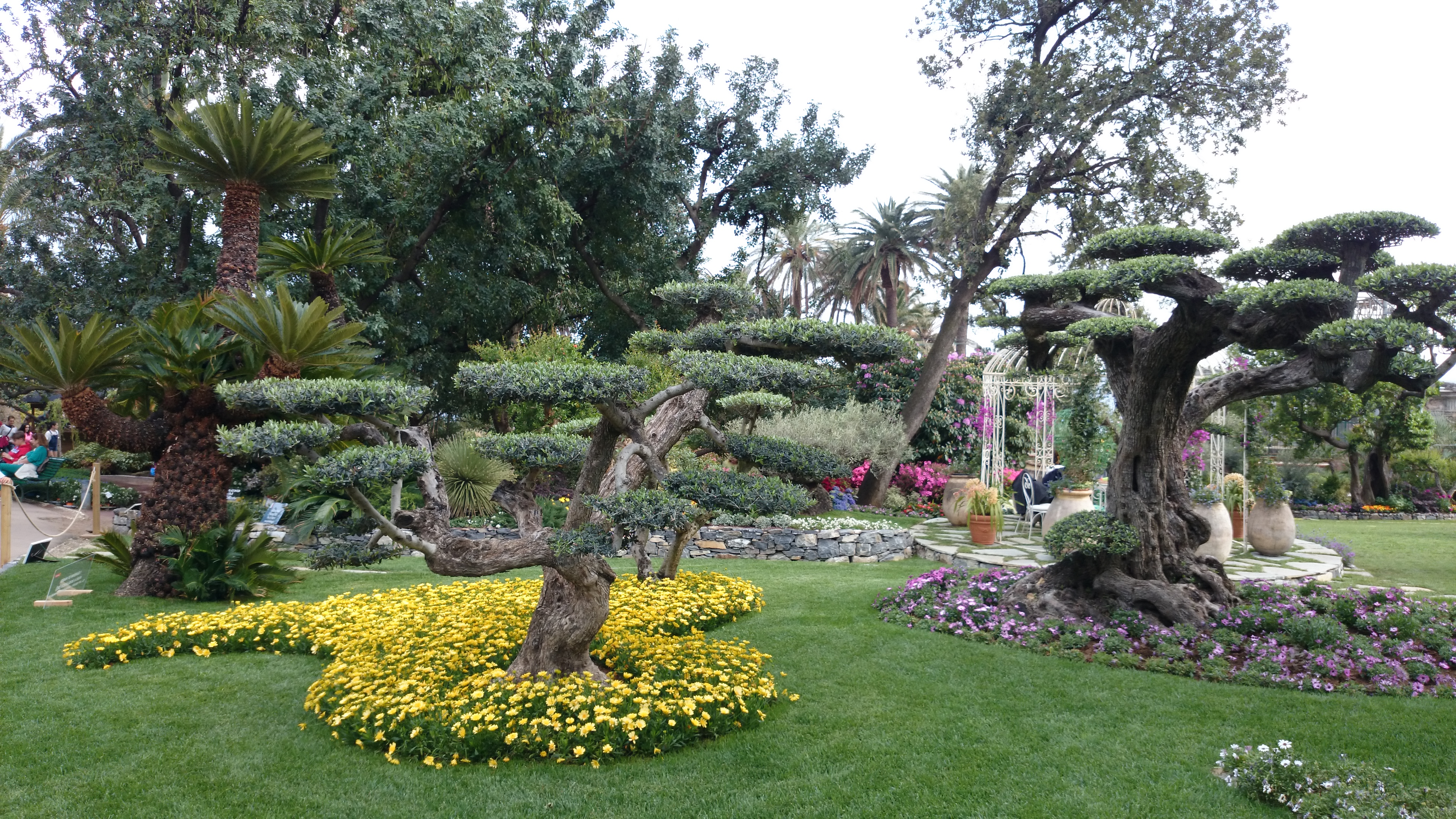

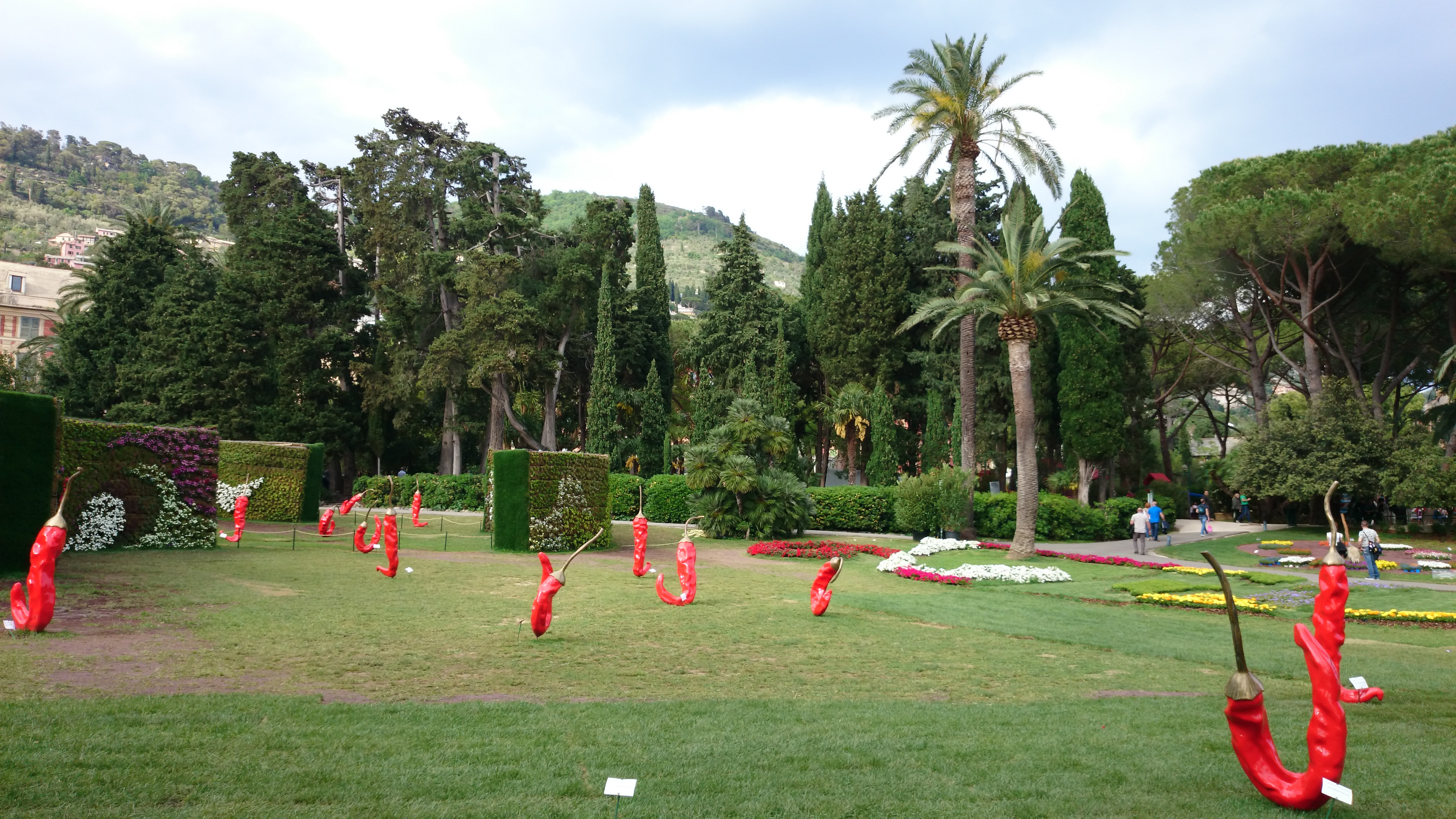

Euroflora 2018 took place for the first time in the Parchi di Nervi, which were reorganized and improved for the event. The installations of plants and flowers were less scenographic, and clearly more natural since they were completely outdoors, taking advantage of the extension of the Parks. Moreover, the event was able to take advantage of the Museums of the Parks and the Rose Garden, which was further improved for the event. The event took place with a first week of sun and heat and only a few days of heavy rain. The event was a great success with the public.

The total number of tickets sold was 246,095. The first 5 days of the event held in April were sold out. The estimate of total attendance is 285,000 presences. The number, in addition to tickets sold, takes into account free admissions for children up to 8 years, disabled people and their caretakers, service passes, and accredited journalists. Entrance fees in the Museums are as follows: 92,335 total attendances, of which 43,768 are to Raccolte Frugone, 32,915 to the Gallery of Modern Art, and 15,652 to the Wolfsoniana. The record day was 30 April, with 7,581 entries.

On 26 April 2018, the Minister of Defence of the Italian Republic, Roberta Pinotti, visited the event. On 2 May 2018, the Senator, Matteo Salvini, accompanied by the Member of the Chamber of Deputies, Edoardo Rixi, the Mayor of Genoa, Marco Bucci, and the President of the Liguria Region, Giovanni Toti, visited the event.

Exhibitors: 250 among floriculturists, florists, floral decorators, and designers. Foreign presences from: France, Spain, Taiwan, China, and the United States, together with a representation of the Consular Corps with 56 countries present.

=== Euroflora 2022 ===
Parchi di Nervi, Genoa Nervi, 23 April – 8 May 2022

Euroflora 2022 was initially scheduled for 2021 but was postponed to 2022 due to the persistence of the COVID-19 pandemic. The event was organized at the Parchi di Nervi, due to the unavailability of the Fiera di Genova, which was undergoing renovation and expansion included in the Waterfront di Levante project, and due to the success of the previous event at the Parchi di Nervi. The event took place from 23 April to 8 May 2022. The attendance was estimated at 300,000. The advance ticket sales were over 100,000.

The event had the same size, if not larger, than that of 2018, but it was more scenographic, with more installations and artificial fountains with water games created to amaze visitors. The installations were much appreciated and there was greater integration between the plants inserted for the event and the Parks of Nervi. Like the previous edition, it took advantage of the Museums of Nervi and the Rose Garden.

On 22 April 2022, the Mayor of Genoa, Marco Bucci, and the President of the Liguria Region, Giovanni Toti, inaugurated the event together with the Member of the Chamber of Deputies, Edoardo Rixi, and other representatives of the Italian institutions. On 23 April 2022, Prince Albert II of Monaco visited Euroflora, together with Marco Bucci and Giovanni Toti, in memory of the first inaugural visit of the event in 1966 by his parents, the actress Grace Kelly, Princess of Monaco, and Prince Rainier III of Monaco.

Unfortunately, the event was conditioned by heavy rains and variable weather that limited the presence of the public. However, the event was much appreciated and considered even more beautiful than the already appreciated one of 2018.

=== Euroflora 2025 ===
Waterfront di Levante, Genoa, 24 April – 4 May 2025

Euroflora 2025, after two editions held at the Parchi di Nervi, returned to its historic location, the Fiera di Genova. However, it was not a return to the past, as underlined by the president of the Liguria region, Marco Bucci, but rather a "back to the future", as the area had been renovated and expanded and constitutes the new Levante waterfront project created by Renzo Piano. The main objective was to highlight the new location on the Levante waterfront and the inauguration of the new Parco della Fiera di Genova, an area, however, that still needed to be completed with numerous trees, in which numerous installations had been placed. The overall exhibition area had been expanded compared to the past, with 84 thousand square meters. The exhibition route began from the new Parco della Fiera di Genova and then continued in the Palasport, with a floating exhibition on the Marina, following the entire route up to the Jean Nouvel pavilion, where other installations were exhibited on both floors.

The death and funeral of Pope Francis, which occurred on 21 April 2025, and the coincidence with Liberation Day on April 25 and the funeral on 26 April 2025, precluded the visit of illustrious guests to Euroflora 2025, such as the scheduled visit to Genoa of the President of the Italian Republic, Sergio Mattarella, who attended some events for 25 April 2025, but who had to return immediately to Rome to attend the Pope's funeral.

To remember Pope Francis, a floral composition was set up in his memory called Panorama Bianco, composed exclusively of white flowers: hydrangeas, calla lilies, daisies, nightshades, and wallflowers, surrounding a portrait of him with the quote of the greeting with which he usually ended the recitation of the Angelus: "And please do not forget to pray for me".

On 24 April 2025, the President of the Liguria Region, Marco Bucci, the Vice President of the Liguria Region, Alessandro Piana, the Acting Deputy Mayor of Genoa, Pietro Piciocchi, and the president of Porto Antico and the Fiera di Genova, Mauro Ferrando, inaugurated the event.

The event also hosted the exhibition of Space V, the startup founded by the first Italian astronaut, Franco Malerba, and dedicated to the cultivation of plants and vegetables in space. The former astronaut present at the event had explained the details of the space agriculture project. Furthermore, a robot for precision pruning of vineyards developed by the Italian Institute of Technology in collaboration with the faculty of agricultural, food, and environmental sciences of the Università Cattolica del Sacro Cuore, was presented at the event.

During the event, the "Giannina" flower dedicated to Giannina Gaslini was presented to the Istituto Giannina Gaslini in Genoa.

On 26 April 2025, Antonio Ricci was a guest at the event in which he talked about the recovery of Villa Della Pergola in Alassio.

The Minister of Tourism, Daniela Santanchè, was unable to attend the inauguration of Euroflora 2025 due to Pope Francis' funeral and the 5-day national mourning, but she underlined the importance of the event for Italy. On 28 April 2025, the event was also visited by the Minister of Infrastructure and Transport and Deputy Prime Minister of Italy, Matteo Salvini, and the Deputy Minister of Infrastructure and Sustainable Mobility, Edoardo Rixi.

On 29 April 2025, the Italian geologist, science communicator, essayist, author, and television host, Mario Tozzi, was a guest of the event, with reflections on nature and the relationship with human beings.

The event received warm, sunny weather, contrasting with the rainy or humid conditions in previous editions, except during the last weekend of the event. The extension was wider but sparse to cover the entire waterfront area, however the enhancement of the waterfront di Levante, that was still to be completed, led to a lesser enhancement of Euroflora. Missing from this edition were the great scenography and large, green spaces with glimpses of the sea, both having been present in editions at the Nervi parks. Exhibition in the Palasport, which has always been the heart of the event, was much less engaging and scenographic than in the past and was smaller, relevant for the tribute exhibition of the Davis Cup trophy and for the remembrance of Pope Francis.

The architectural project of the event was signed by the architect Matteo Fraschini, who, for some participants, failed to capture the spirit of the event and to enhance the large spaces that the area offered. For some, the concept, expressed for the master plan of the exhibition that recalls origami shapes built with wood, was a total expressive failure. The architect completely missed the vision and concept of a garden on the sea, which part of the public hoped to see. While the installations and single floral exhibitions, especially of the municipalities of the Italian Riviera, caught the attention and appreciation of the public.

The Bonsai exhibition was also highly appreciated by the public, and deserved a more in-depth study and a more valorising installation, as well as the artistic installation that combined floral composition and art with a reinterpretation of Botticelli's Primavera. Finally, visitors found the Campania Region exhibition very interesting and well done, featuring a display inspired by the majolica pergola of the cloister of Santa Chiara in Naples.

On 6 May 2025, the number of attendees at this edition of the event was announced, approximately 200,000 people, and the presence of a younger audience compared to other editions was highlighted.

==== Ville, parchi e musei di Genova in fiore per Euroflora ====
Although the parks of Nervi are not the venue for the event, they have nevertheless been included in the initiative "Ville, parchi e musei di Genova in fiore per Euroflora" of the municipality of Genoa, an initiative aimed at expanding the tourist and cultural offerings throughout the city of Genoa.

=== Euroflora 2028 ===
Genoa, April – May 2028

== See also ==
- Giardino all'italiana
- Italian Riviera
- Liguria
- List of botanical gardens in Italy
- The Parks of Genoa
