= Parks of Genoa =

Parks in the Italian city of Genoa

The parks of Genoa are for the most part green areas comprising the gardens of aristocratic villas and some adjoining open land.

The largest park of the town is the system of the Parks of the Forts, while the most famous and renowned are the Parks of Nervi, bordered by the Anita Garibaldi promenade. In the city centre, in addition to the hanging gardens of historic palaces, the Parks of Piazza Corvetto and Groppallo Park are the most attended (the latter is open to the public only on particular occasions).

== Parks of the forts ==
A natural complex formed by the continuity of two parks adjoining the urban walls and the hill area of the defence forts nearly encircles the city. It is one of the widest urban natural areas of Italy, encompassing 611.69 hectares.

Name	Location	Characteristics
Urban park of the walls	Centre-Hills	Genoa's largest urban park, at 87.600 m^{2}; it is contained between the historic walls and the forts that rise on the city hills.
Urban park of Peralto	Centre-Hills	Urban park adjoining the Righi viewpoint and towered by Forte Sperone.

== Parks of Nervi ==
The parks of Nervi are best known for the botanic complex of the city adjoining the Anita Garibaldi promenade, formed by the joining of the gardens of different historic villas, and include:

Name	Location	Characteristics
Villa Groppallo	East (Nervi)	Country house of marquis Gaetano Gropallo, now houses Nervi's Library, surrounded by a 36.215 m^{2} park.
Villa Saluzzo Serra	East (Nervi)	A 17th–century villa, now houses the Gallery of Modern Arts, surrounded by a 23.415 m^{2} park.
Villa Grimaldi Fassio	East (Nervi)	The villa now houses the "Raccolte Frugone" Museum; the park slopes towards the sea along the promenade named after Anita Garibaldi.
Villa Luxoro	East (Nervi)	The 20th-century villa now houses Giannettino Luxoro Museum; the 8.500 m^{2} park slopes up to the Capolungo cliff.

== Parks of the city's north and centre ==
Name	Location	Characteristics
Piazza Corvetto Parks	Center	A green area formed by two adjoining parks, among which stands the central square. These parks at large are the most attended of the city center, the so-called "Sunday Park". The Parks of Piazza Corvetto are: The Acquasola Park: designed in 1821 by the architect Carlo Barabino upon the area of a medieval bastion connected to the 16th-century Walls (2.5 hectares).; Villetta Dinegro: the 2-hectare park rises in the full city center: built in the 18th-century upon the San Giovanni bastion (16th-century), it is the setting of the Edoardo Chiossone Museum of Oriental Art, built on the site of the former neoclassical villa of the marquis Gian Carlo Di Negro (19th-century).
Groppallo Park	Center	Together with the Piazza Corvetto Park, this is one of the main parks of the city center (open to the public only on specific occasions).
Giardini Reali	Center	Overlooking the Old Harbor dock, located around the baroque Palazzo Reale, in Via Balbi.
Palazzo del Principe Garden	Center	The Italian garden of Andrea Doria's palace with the characteristic Neptune Fountain, it is divided into four big flowerbeds and comprises Mediterranean, Middle-Eastern, and American plants and herbs.
Palazzo Bianco and Palazzo Doria-Tursi Gardens	Center	Italian hanging gardens, set between two of the most famous Palazzi dei Rolli of Strada Nuova.
Nicolosio Lomellino Gardens	Center	In Via Garibaldi, the garden has hanging terraces and a nymphaeum with water games.
Villa Imperiale Scassi	Center	Villa with a 16th-century park in Sampierdarena. It still conserves part of the magnificent gardens for which it was nicknamed "La Bellezza" (The Beauty).
Fiumara Park	Center	It adjoins the big pedestrian street in the central district of Sampierdarena.
Villa Croce	Center	A park situated upon the Carignano Hill, overlooking the mount ringroad. Inside is situated the 19th-century villa, donated by Andrea Croce to Genoa Municipality. It houses the Contemporary Art Museum.
Villa Gruber De Mari	Center	An almost 13.500 m^{2} park in Castelletto district overlooking the sea ringroad and characterized by a neoclassical villa. It includes the tower of the original building, dating back to the 16th century.
Castello d'Albertis Park	Center	The park surrounds the 19th-century neogothic castle. From the hills of the Montegalletto 16th-century bastion, overhanging the sea, it is possible to enjoy a complete panorama of the Gulf of Genoa. The complex accommodates the Museum of the Cultures of the World and it is situated in the Castelletto district.
Villa Saluzzo Bombrini Park	Center	This park of almost an hectare surrounds the 19th-century villa housing the Conservatory named after Niccolò Paganini, in the central Albaro district.
Villa Imperiale (Cattaneo Terralba)	Center (San Fruttuoso)	A 16th-century-style park surrounds the 15th-century villa of the aristocrat Lorenzo Cristoforo Cattaneo, in the San Fruttuoso district. In 1502, it hosted king Louis XII of France; the complex was then passed to the Salvago family, then to the Imperiale of Sant'Angelo, and finally became property of Genoa Municipality.
Wood of the Minor Friars	Hills	In the wooded hills of low Valbisagno, in San Fruttuoso district, it is near the religious complex of the "Madonna del Monte" sanctuary.
Prato Casarile	Center	In the northern district of Molassana, the park rises on a lake basin.

== Parks of the city's west ==
Name	Location	Characteristics
Villa Brignole Sale Duchessa di Galliera	City Centre	In the district of Voltri, the 25-hectare park includes the "Palazzo Brignole Sale" (14th-century origins, widened in the 18th and 19th century) and the Madonna delle Grazie sanctuary (160 metres at sea level) with the Duchess of Galliera family vaults.
Punta Martin urban Park	Hills	Urban park situated behind Pegli district.
Villa Doria	City Centre	Situated in Pegli. It is a 115.000 m^{2} park which surrounds the 16th-century villa of the banker Centurione, Andrea Doria's father-in-law; it was inhabited by the prince Gian Andrea Doria and by his descendants.
Mount Pennello urban Park	Hills	Urban park situated behind Pegli district.
Villa Durazzo-Pallavicini	City Centre	In Pegli. Residential building and historic park in which is based the Museum of Ligurian archeology and the botanical gardens created in 1794 and belonging to Clelia Durazzo Pallavicini. The path inside the park, realized (in the 1840s) by Michele Canzio (stage designer of the Teatro Carlo Felice and brother of the patriot Stefano Canzio) for the marquis Ignazio Alessandro Pallavicini, is a sort of theatrical itinerary, articulated into a series of sceneries conceived as a backstage. In spring, it is possible to watch the spectacular blossom of the "Viale delle Camelie" (the boulevard of camellias).
Mount Gazzo urban Park	Hills	Urban park situated behind Sestri Ponente district.
Villa Rossi Martini	City Centre	In the Sestri Ponente park (40.425 m^{2}), which joins the 17th-century villa of the Genoese family of the Lomellini; the vegetation is rich with various exotic and Mediterranean species. It is also a site for summer theatrical shows.
Urban Park of the valley of Rio San Pietro	Valleys	An urban park situated in a little valley in Cornigliano district, recently opened on the occasion of the renovation of the district.

== Parks of the city's east ==
Name	Location	Characteristics
Villa Gambaro	Center	Albaro district.
Villa Carrara	Center	Adjoins the Gaslini pediatric hospital.
Villa Quartara	Center	Quarto district.
Monte Fasce and Monte Moro urban parks	Hills	Situated behind the city in the extreme east.

== Regional parks ==
- Natural Park of Mount Antola
- Natural Park of Mount Aveto
- Natural Park of Mount Beigua
- Natural Park of Bric Tana
- Natural Park of Porto Venere
- Natural Park of Montemarcello – Magra
- Natural Park of Piana Crixia

== National parks ==
- Natural Park of Portofino
