= Villa Grimaldi Fassio =

Palace and museum in Genoa, Liguria, Italy

Coordinates: 44°22′53″N 9°02′52″E

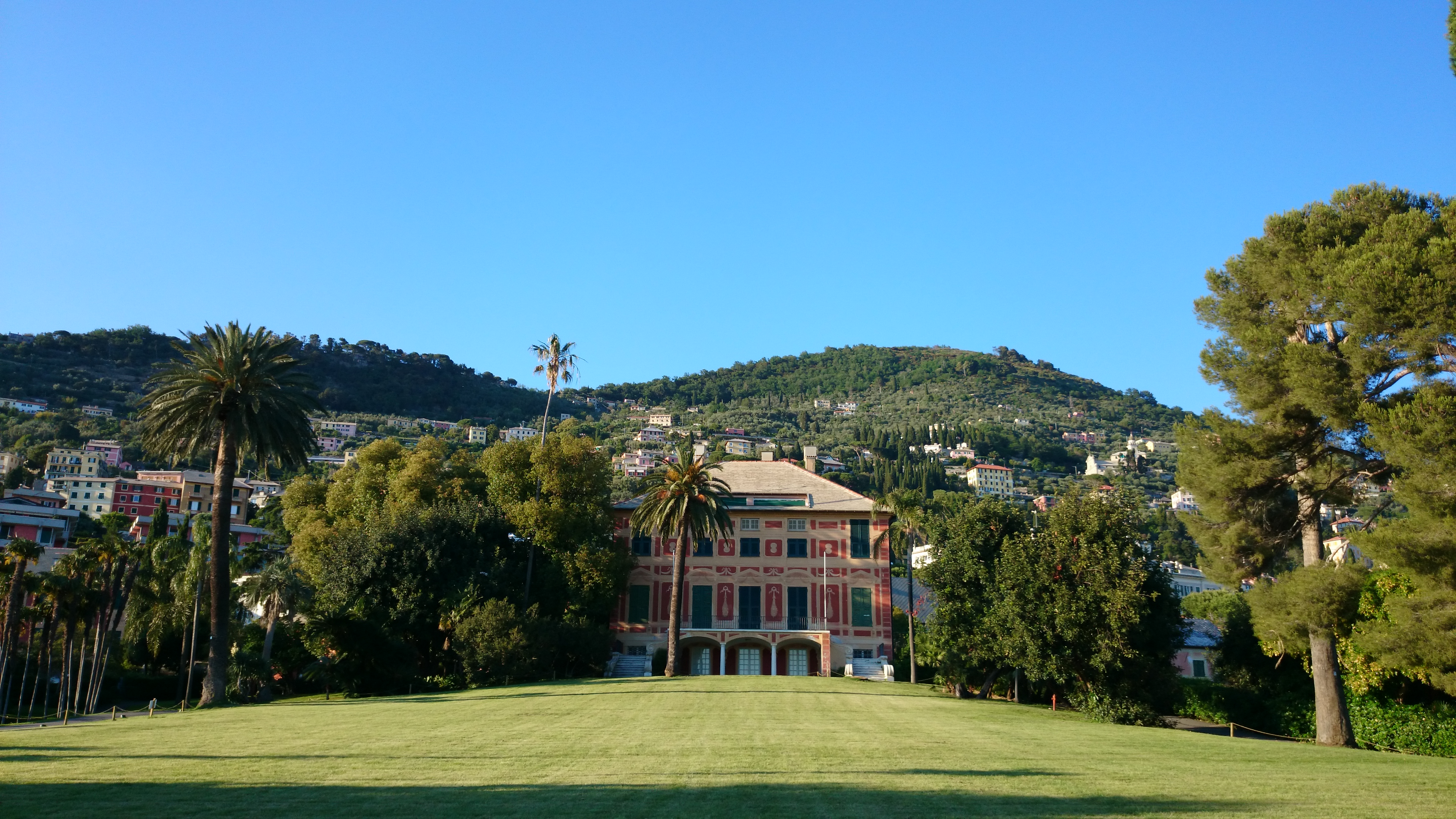

The Villa Grimaldi Fassio is an 18th-century rural palace, now museum, and rose garden located on Via Capolungo 9 of Nervi, the eastern coastal quarter of the city of Genoa, region of Liguria, Italy. The property was purchased by the municipality of Genoa, is part of a series of parks and museums of the Gallerie d'Arte Moderna (GAM or Modern Art Gallery) which include the Giannettino Luxoro Museum, the Wolfsonian Museum, and the museum at Villa Saluzzo Serra. The Villa Grimaldi Fasso is the home of the Raccolte Frugone since 1993.

== History ==
A structure at the site was first erected in the 16th century. Next to the villa still remains a deconsecrated chapel, dating back to the second half of the 18th century, and which is documented along the adjacent building in an eighteenth-century map by the cartographer of the Republic of Genoa Matteo Vinzoni. By the end of the 19th century, the building was listed in the Napoleonic Catasto as a "holiday building" or vacation villa of Giuseppe fu Andrea Croce. The Croce seem to be the descendants of the Grimaldi. In 1931 the villa was sold to the Brizzolesi family who sold it in 1956 to the shipowners Fassio Tomellini, who would make major changes to the structure of the building, designed by the architect Luigi Carlo Daneri, including the creation of a new lounge with access to the park. The municipality of Genoa purchased the villa and the surrounding park (12,000 m^{2}) from the latter owners in 1979. Since 1993, the villa became the museum to display the 'Frugone Collection (Raccolte Frugone), assembled during the late 19th and early 20th-centuries by the brothers Luigi and Lazzaro Giovanni Battista Frugone. The large rose garden, named the Viacava garden, displays about 800 varieties of different roses. It was restored and named after its creator in April 2012.

== Frugone Collection ==
The Raccolte Frugone are an important collection of works: paintings, sculptures and drawings by some of the major Italian and foreign artists active between the second half of the nineteenth century and the early twentieth century that belonged to the Frugone brothers.

The museum displays works of art by Mosé Bianchi, Leonardo Bistolfi, Giovanni Boldini, Guglielmo Ciardi, Luigi Conconi, Tranquillo Cremona, Lorenzo Delleani, Giuseppe De Nittis, Giovanni Fattori, Antonio Fontanesi, Emilio Gola, Giacomo Grosso, Antonio Mancini, Francesco Messina, Francesco Paolo Michetti, Alessandro Milesi, Richard Miller, Giuseppe Palizzi and Filippo Palizzi, Edoardo Rubino, Giovanni Segantini, Telemaco Signorini, Joaquin Sorolla y Bastida, Ettore Tito, Paolo Troubetzkoy.

== Rose Garden ==
It was built in 1981 on the initiative of Luigi Viacava, director of the Gardens and Forests Service of the Municipality of Genoa.
The rose garden, for its position near the sea, represents one of the most beautiful in Liguria and in Italy. In 2018 and 2022, the rose garden was part of Euroflora.

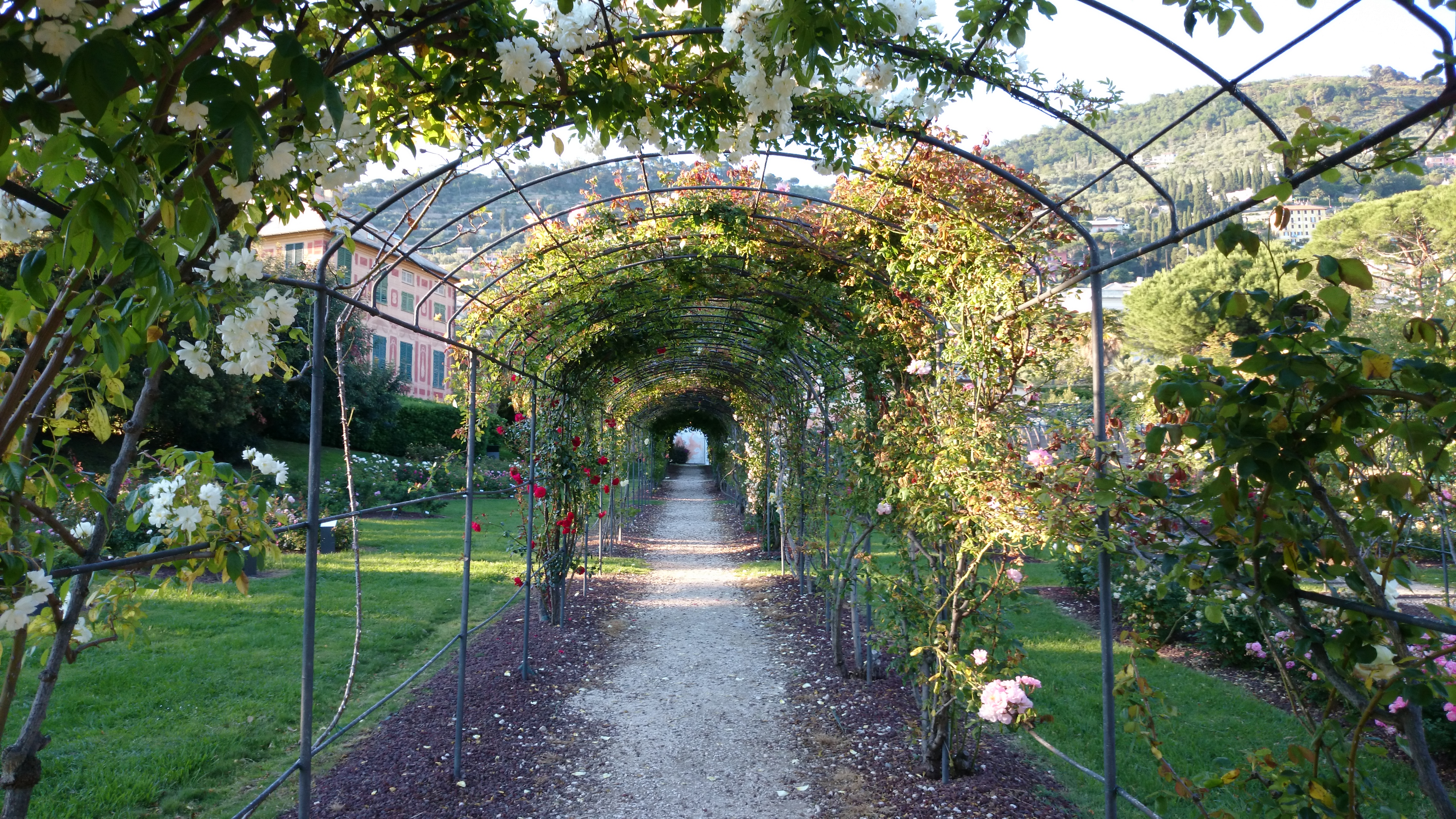

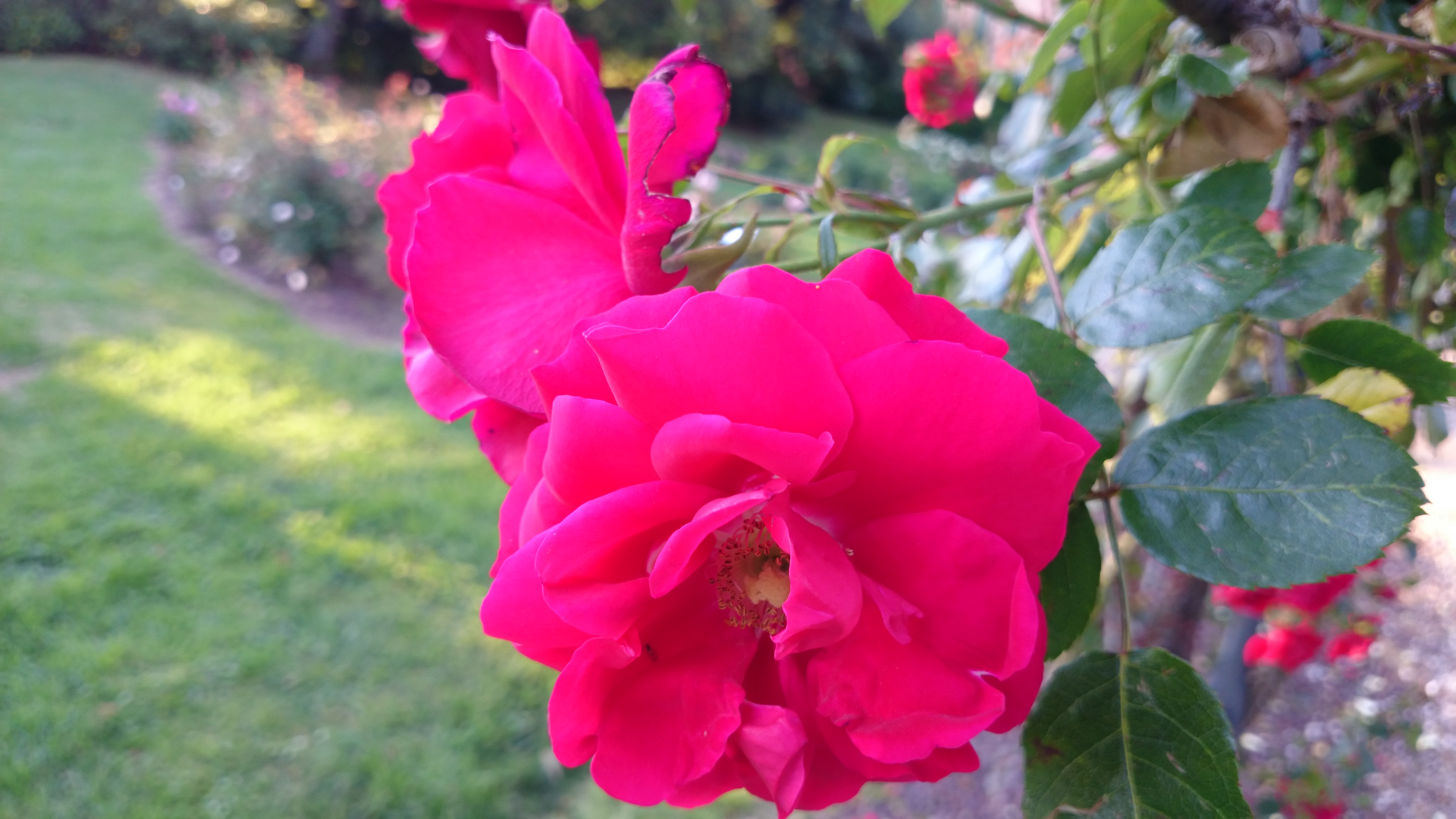

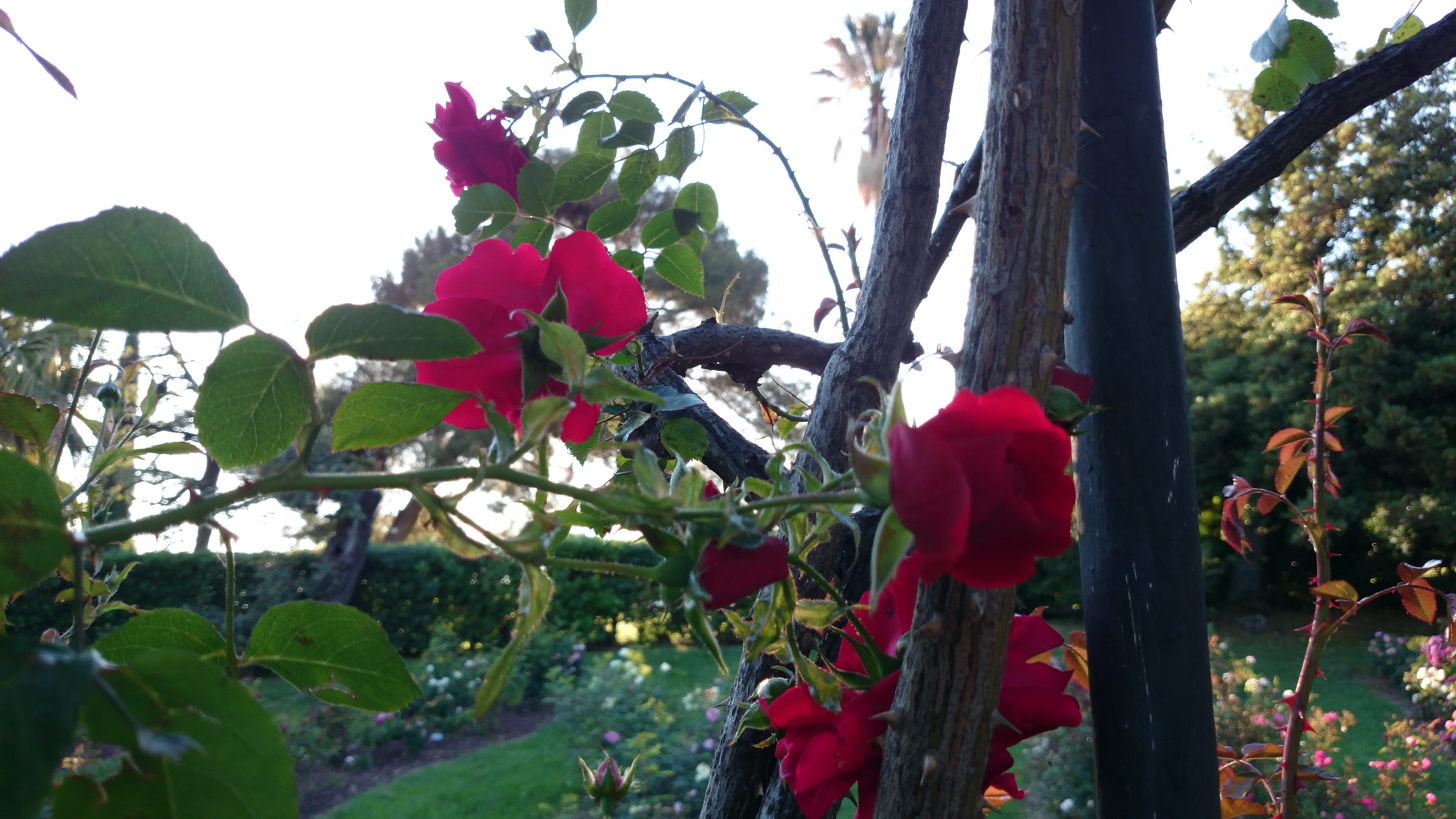

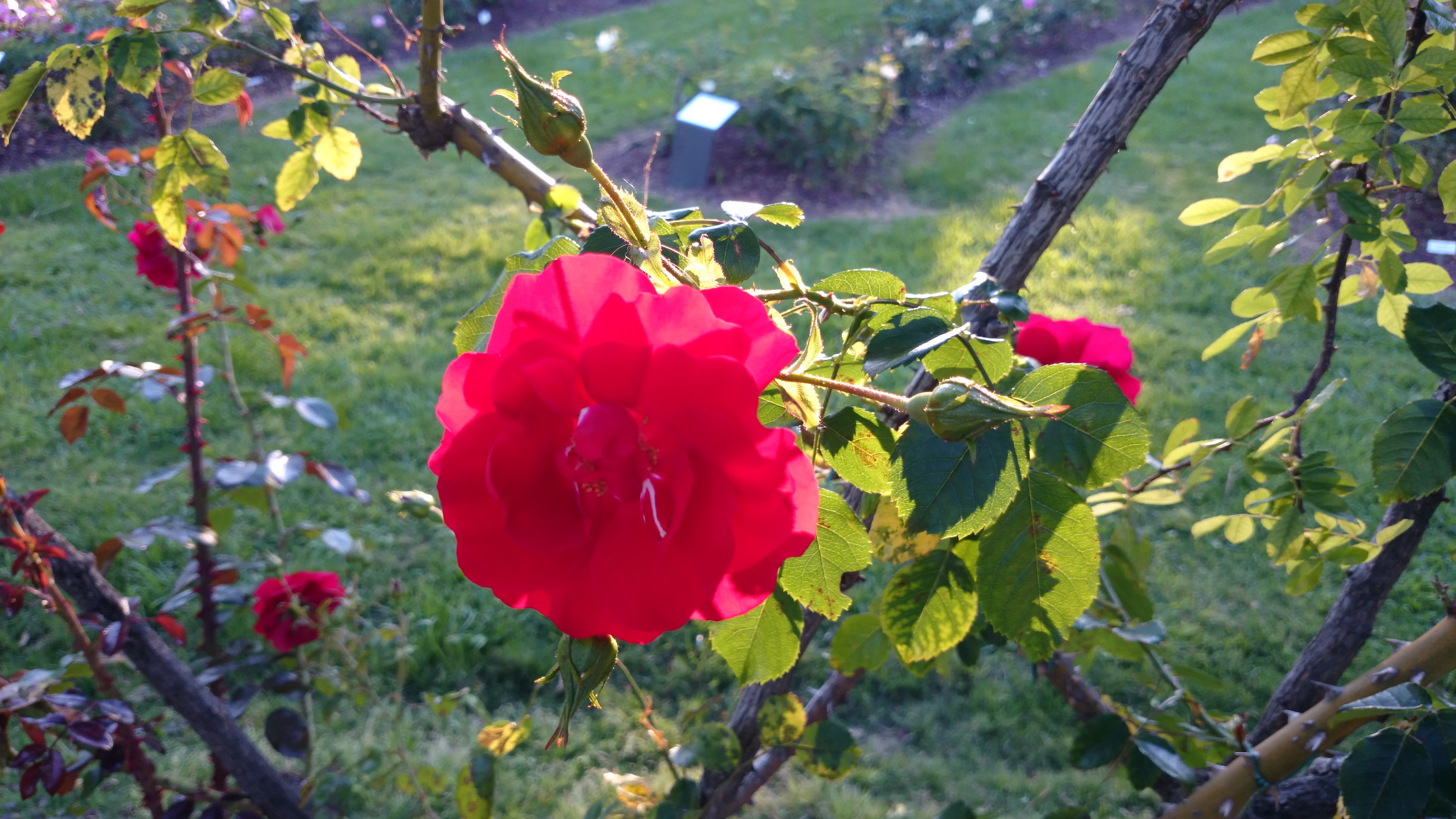

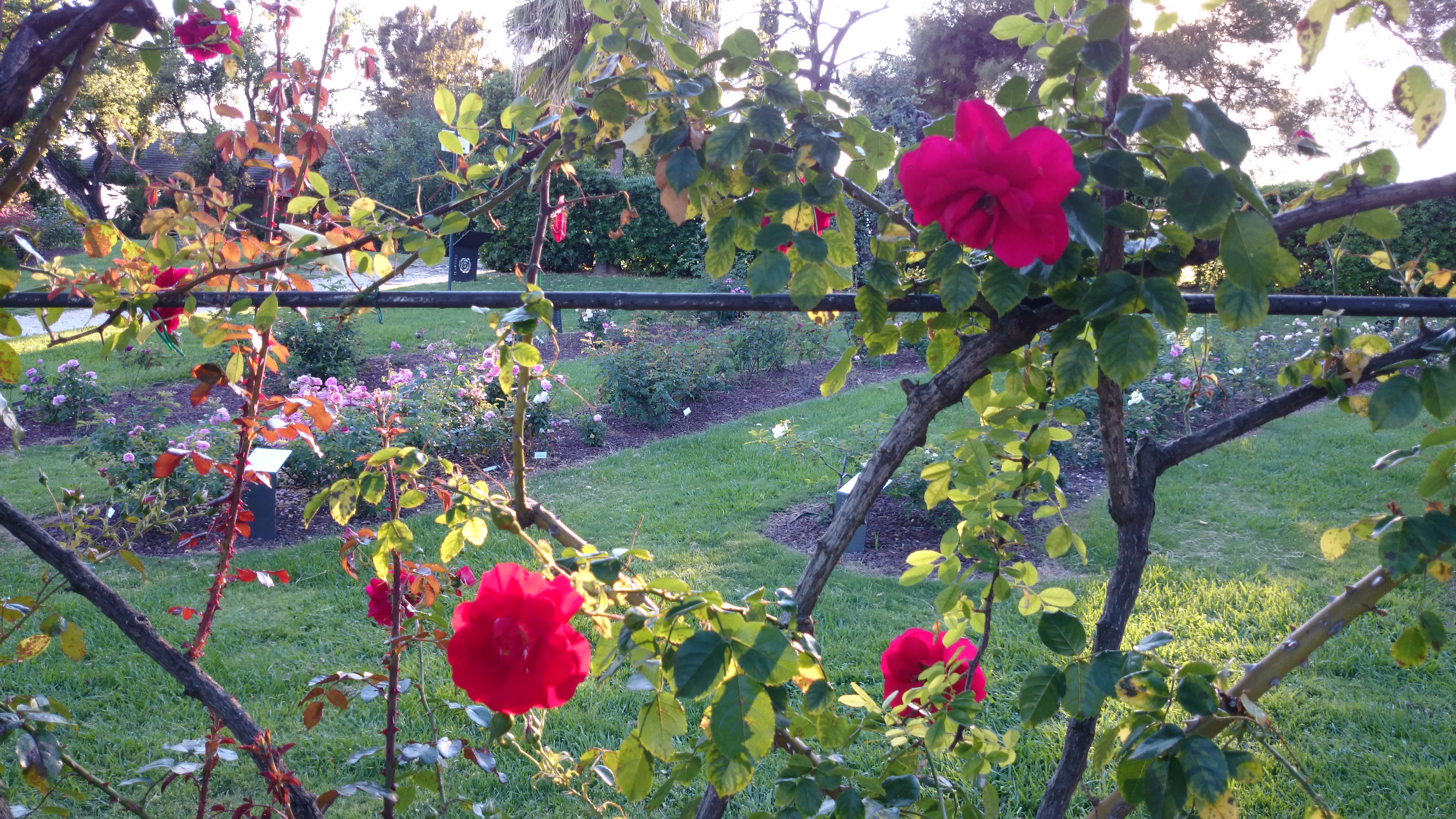

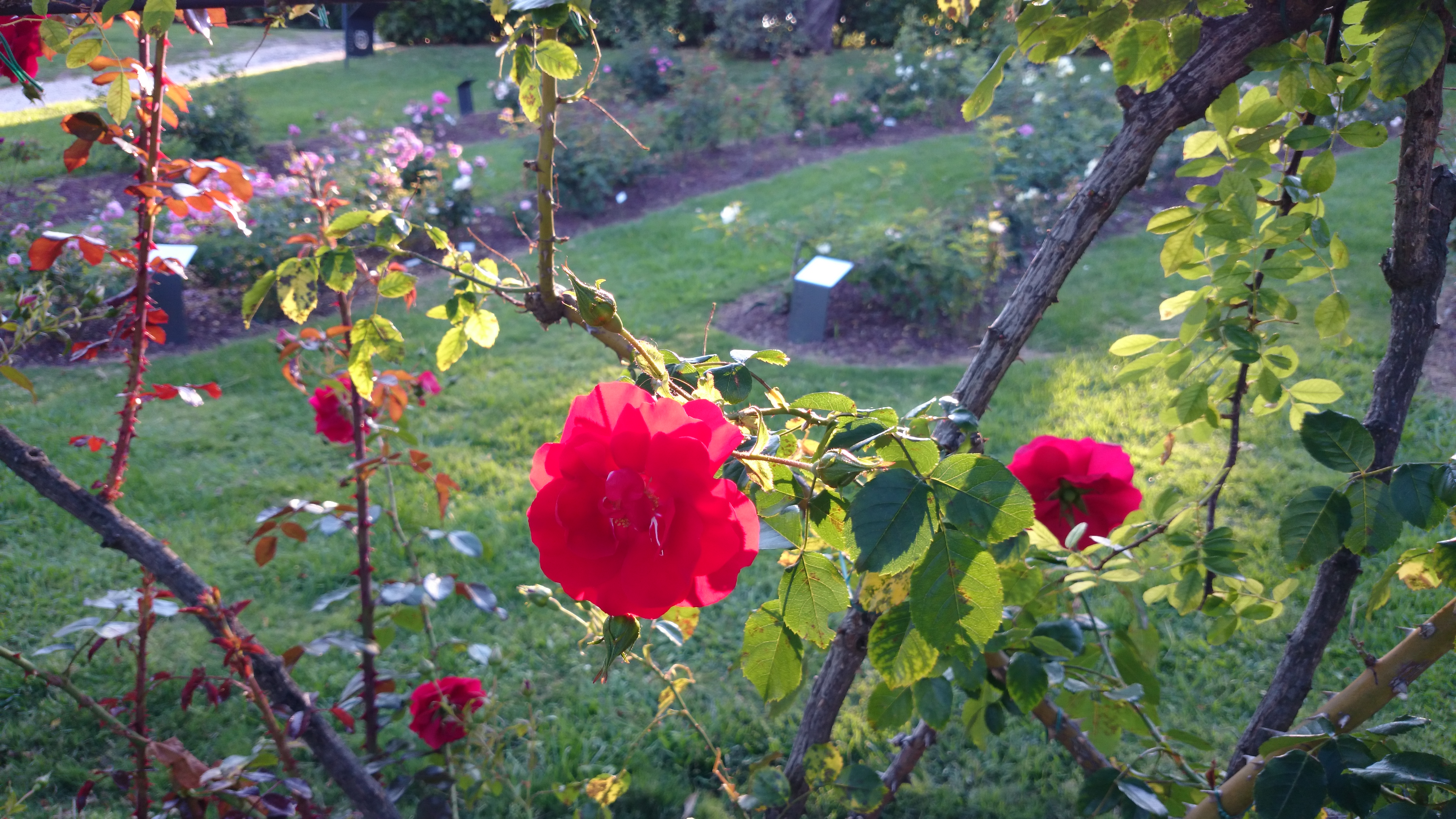

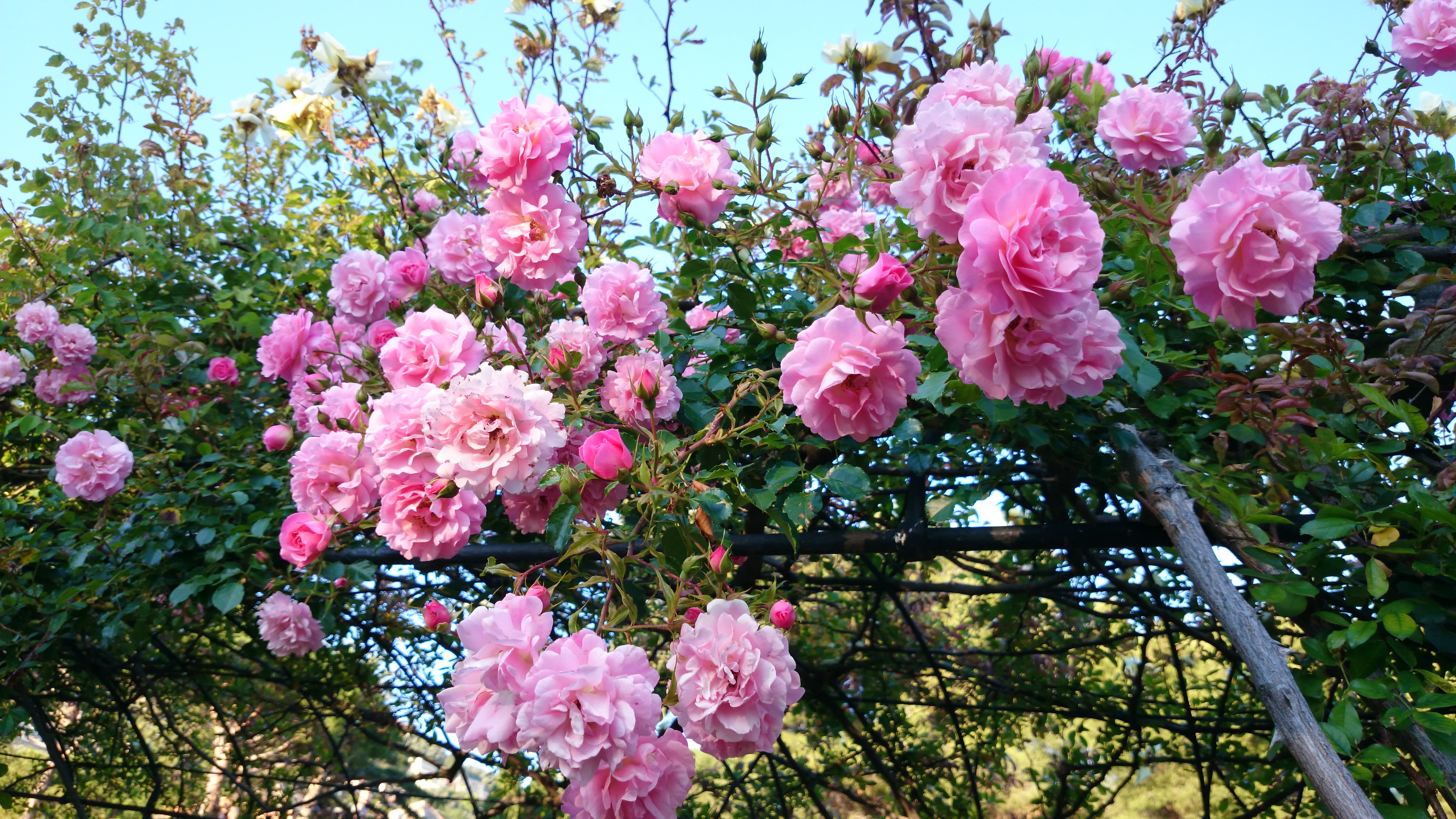

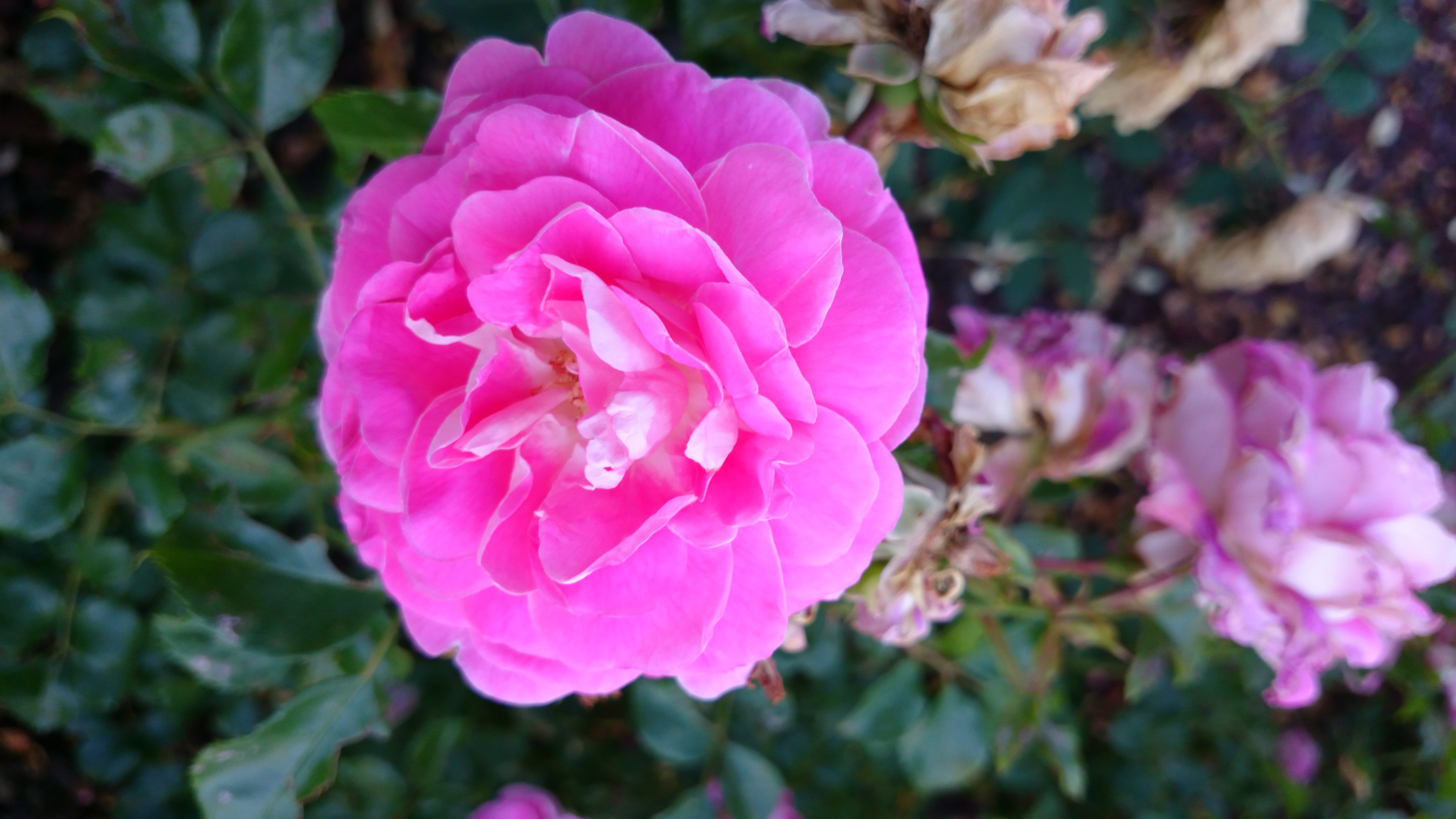

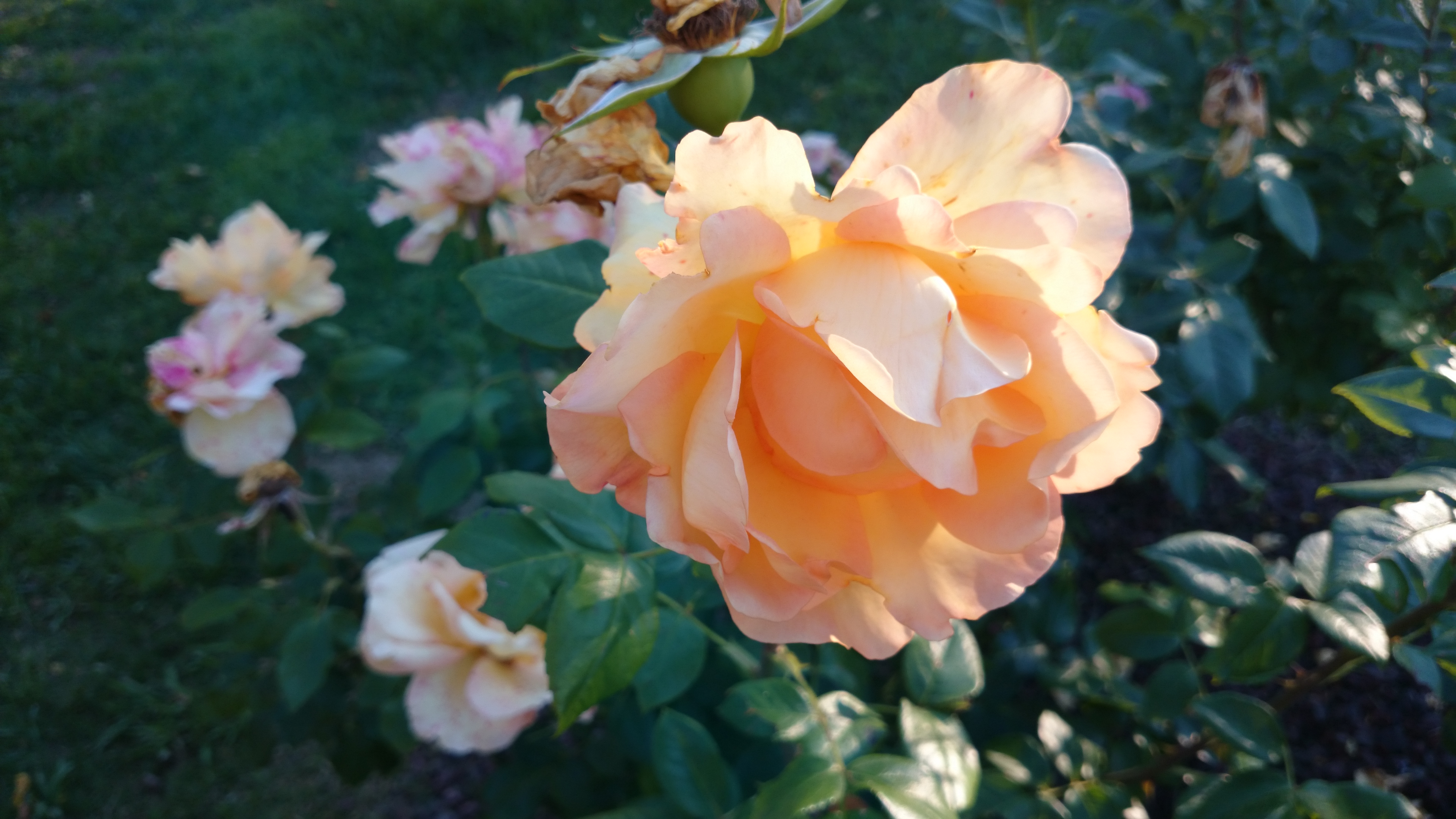

Premio Genova Concorso internazionale della rosa rifiorente
- Frequency: Annual
- Venue: Nervi, Genoa, Italy
- Years active: 1984–1999
- Previous event: 24 September 1999

== Premio Genova ==
Concorso internazionale della rosa rifiorente
Since 1985, the international competition of reflowered rose, also known as the "Premio Genova", has been hold there for many years.
The "Premio Genova", was hold in the last week of September and the subject of the competition were roses cultivated for at least two years and periodically inspected by a permanent jury that pronounced twice a year, in June and September, judging on the ability to produce flowers without interruptions from May onwards besides of course evaluating the beauty of the flowers themselves. At the end of the second year the prize was awarded by an international jury that integrated the judgment of the permanent jury.

== See also ==
- Nervi
- Parks of Genoa
- Villa Saluzzo Serra
- Genoa: Le Strade Nuove and the system of the Palazzi dei Rolli
- Euroflora
- Villas of Genoa
