= Nervi =

- Quartiere
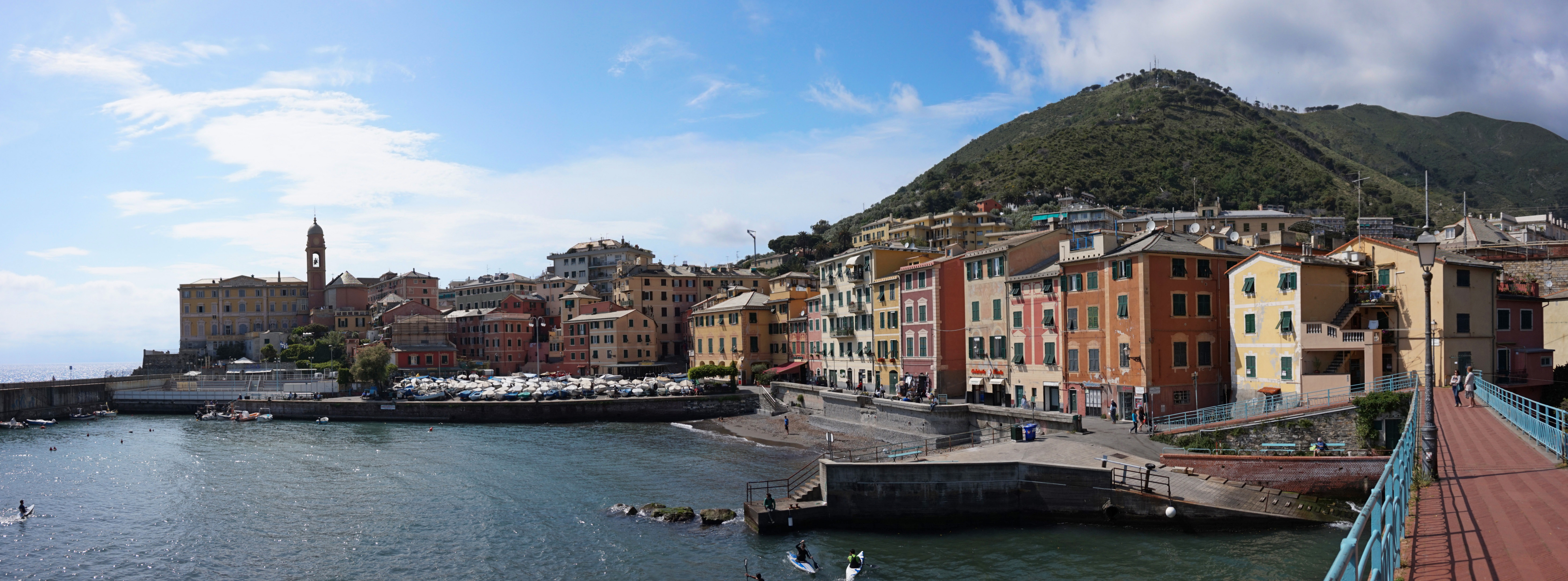
- The Porticciolo of Nervi

- Location in Italy
- Coordinates: 44°23′N 9°02′E
- Country: Italy
- Region: Liguria
- Province: Province of Genoa
- Comune: Genoa

Population (2017)
  - Total: 10,484

Nervi is a former fishing village 12 miles (19 km) northwest of Portofino on the Riviera di Levante, now a seaside resort in Liguria, in northwest Italy. Once an independent comune, it is now a quartiere of Genoa. Nervi is 4 miles (7 km) east of central Genoa.

Multiple 16th-century sources describe Nervi as the birthplace of Christopher Columbus, though his exact origins remain a matter of debate.

== Geography ==
Nervi is a district of Genoa. At the beginning of the century, it is mentioned as being surrounded with groves of olives, oranges and lemons, and beautiful gardened villas. At 25 meters above sea level, Genoa has a moist climate that is less dusty than the Riviera di Ponente, the part of the Italian Riviera west of Genoa, and is especially in favor with those who suffer from lung complaints.

== Museums ==
Nervi is home to four significant museums.

The Genoa Gallery of Modern Arts, in the former Villa Saluzzo Serra and the Raccolte Frugone, in the former Villa Grimaldi Fassio have paintings, sculptures, and drawings by Italian and other artists from the 19th and 20th centuries. The collection also includes items related to the cultural history of Genoa and Liguria.

The Wolfsoniana is a regional museum of the Wolfsonian-Florida International University of Florida International University in Miami, Florida. It contains items from the 19th and 20th centuries such as architectural drawings, graphics, posters, sketches and drawings, books and other publications, paintings, sculptures, furniture, and glass, ceramic, wrought iron, and silver objects.

The Museo Giannettino Luxoro features collections of clocks and watches from the 18th and 19th centuries, ceramics, furniture, and fine clothing in a restored villa.

In July 2020, the Italia Nostra announced it would partake in the historic renovation of Nervi.

== Points of interest ==
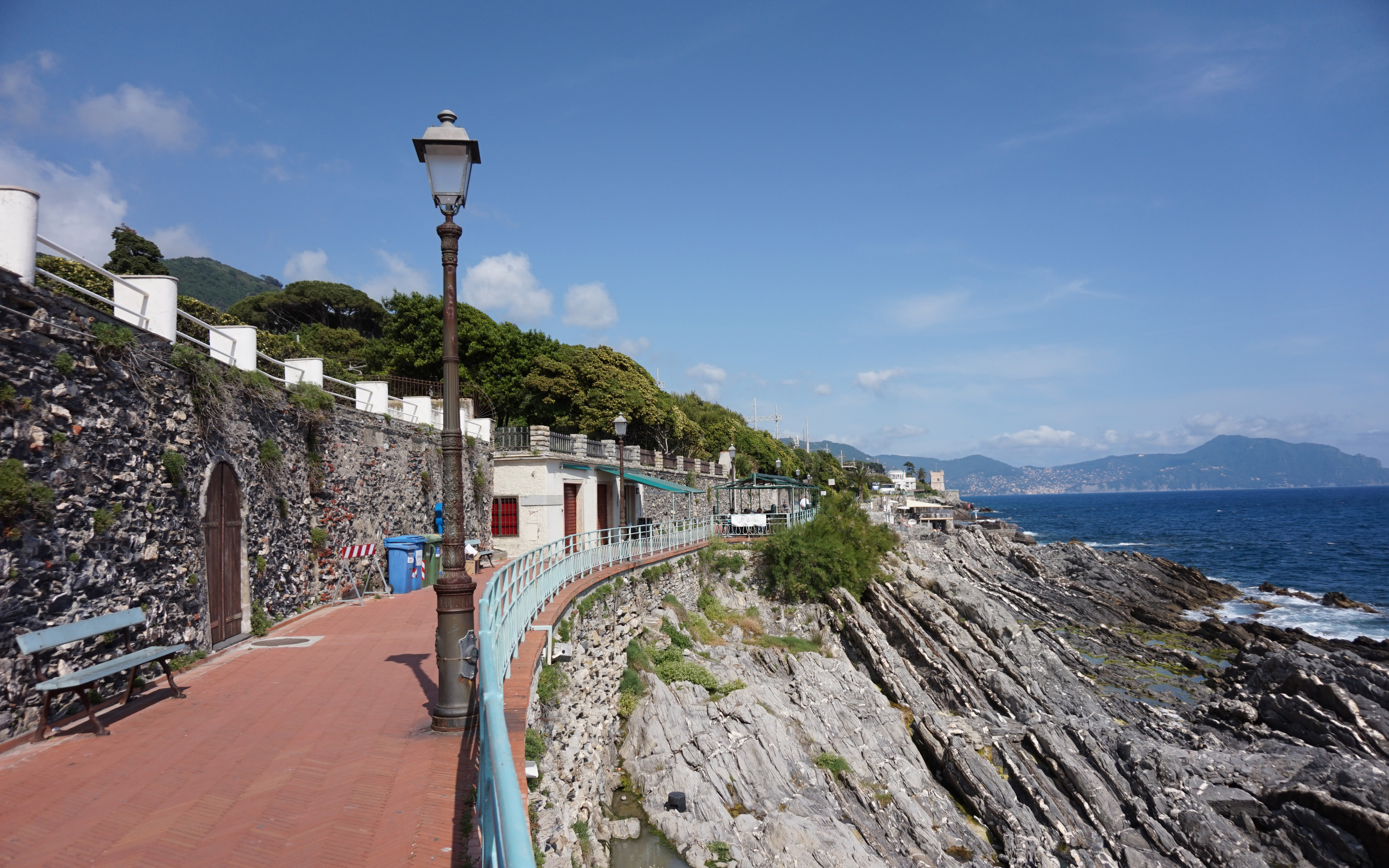
Passeggiata Anita Garibaldi

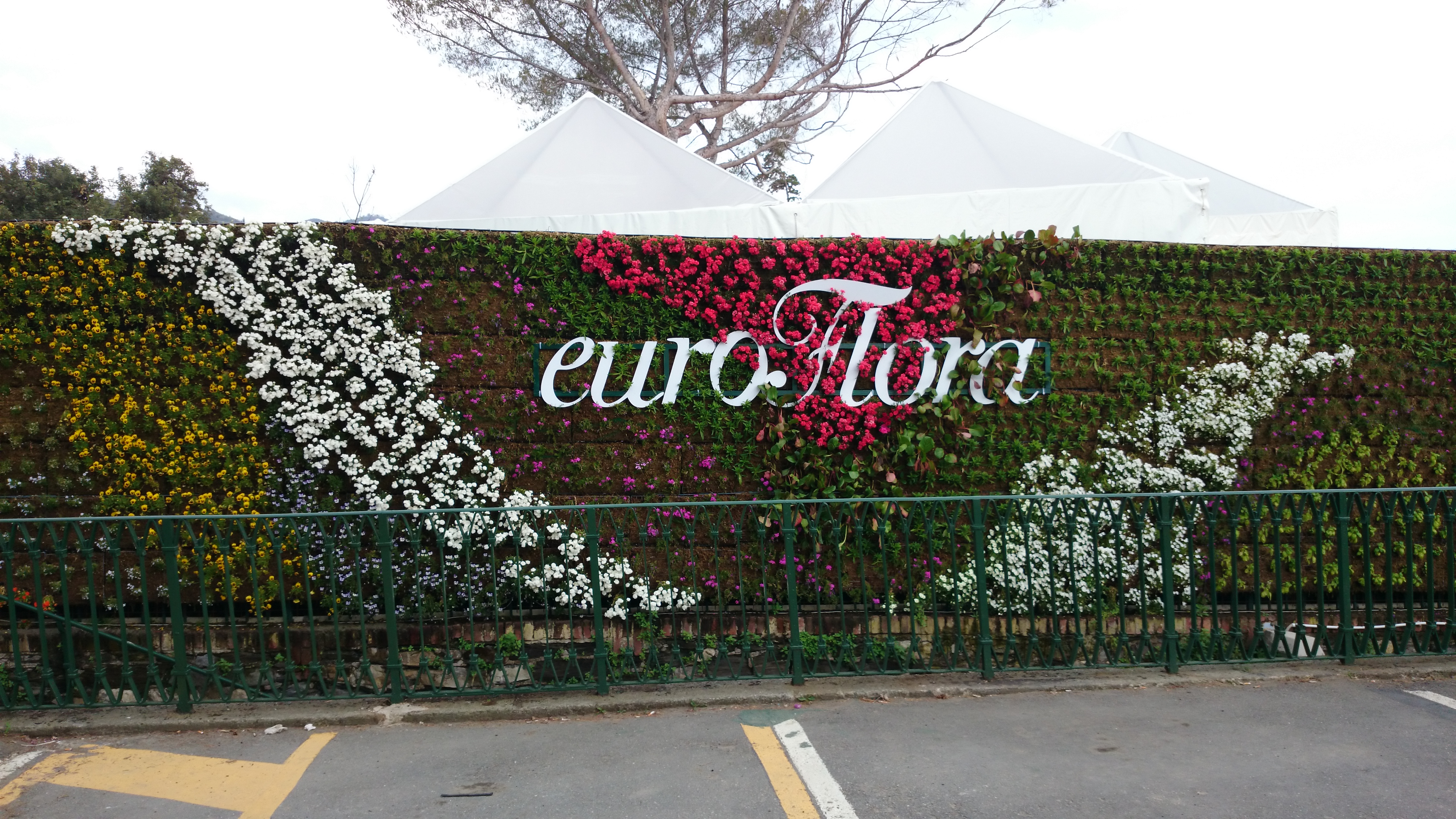

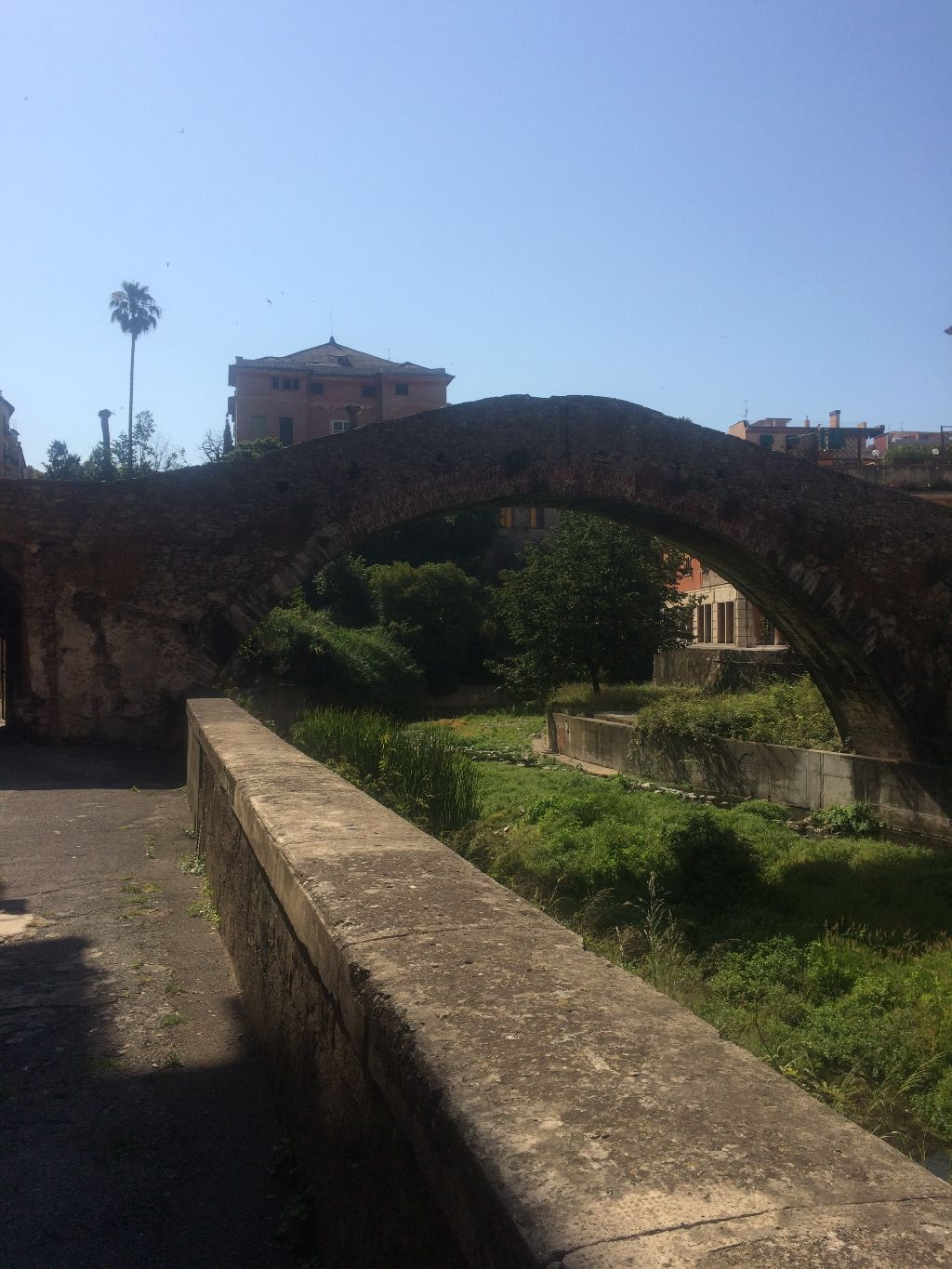
Ancient bridge in Nervi, Genoa, Italy

Especially popular is the Passeggiata Anita Garibaldi, a 2 km walkway along the ocean cliffs. The views make it one of Italy's "most beautiful promenades".

The Parchi di Nervi is a park of about 22 acres (9 hectares) created from the gardens of the Villa Grimaldi, Villa Gropallo, and Villa Serra. It has typical Mediterranean plant species and many exotic species. The former Villa Luxoro, now a museum, and Villa Gnecco, now a luxury hotel, also abut the Parchi. Nervi is these days a busy and quite up-market residential area that is almost entirely apartments, many of which are older style buildings from the 19th century that have been converted from large middle-class houses. There are many shops vying for business most of which sell good quality items especially the clothing and fashion outlets.

== Euroflora ==
In 2018 Euroflora event was held for the first time at the Nervi parks. The event returned to the Nervi parks in 2022.

== Festival Internazionale del Balletto e della Musica ==
The festival was held from 17 July to 2 August 2020 in the Nervi Parks.
