= Monte Fasce =

Mountain in Italy

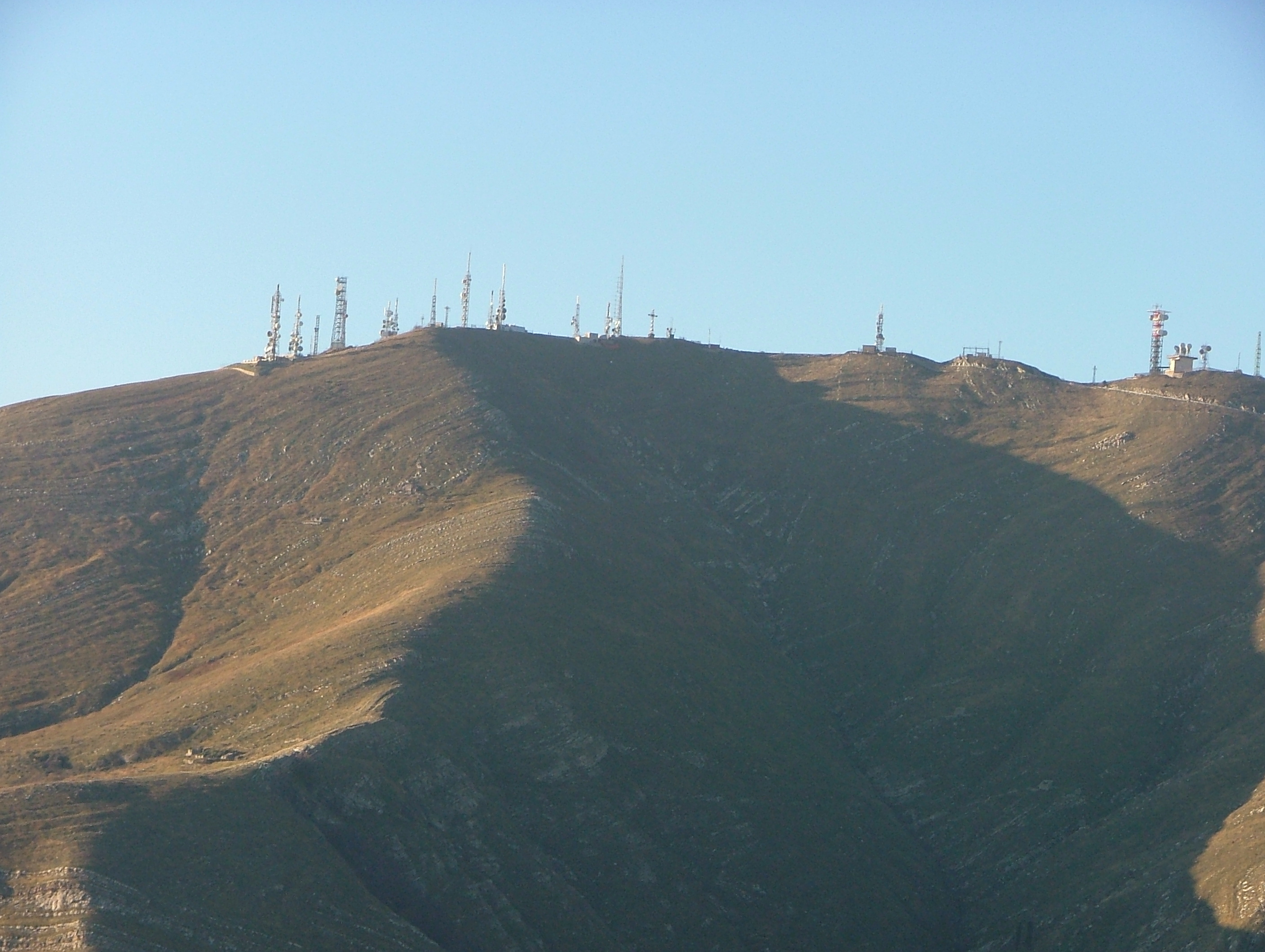
- Southern side of Monte Fasce, seen from Sassarego.

Highest point
- Elevation: 834 m (2,736 ft)
- Prominence: 84 m (276 ft)
- Coordinates: 44.4094°N 9.03444°E

Geography
- Location within Italy
- Location: Liguria, Italy
- Parent range: Ligurian Apennines

Monte Fasce is a mountain in Liguria, northern Italy, part of the Ligurian Apennines. It is located in the province of Genoa. It lies at an altitude of 834 metres.

== Nature conservation ==
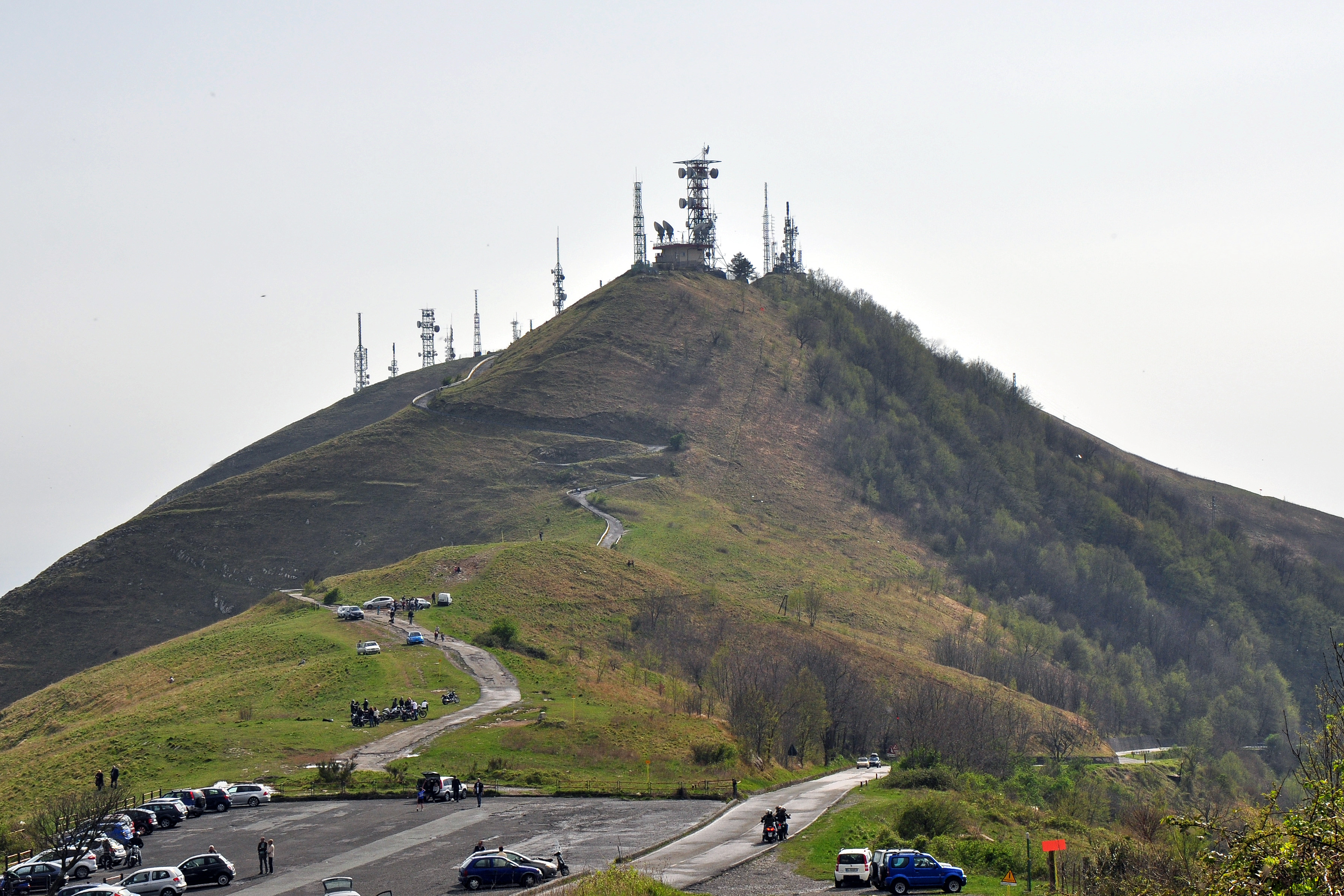
North side with TV masts.

The mountain and its surrounding area are included in a SIC (Site of Community Importance) called Monte Fasce (code:IT1331718).
