= Ride of the Valkyries =

Musical composition by Richard Wagner

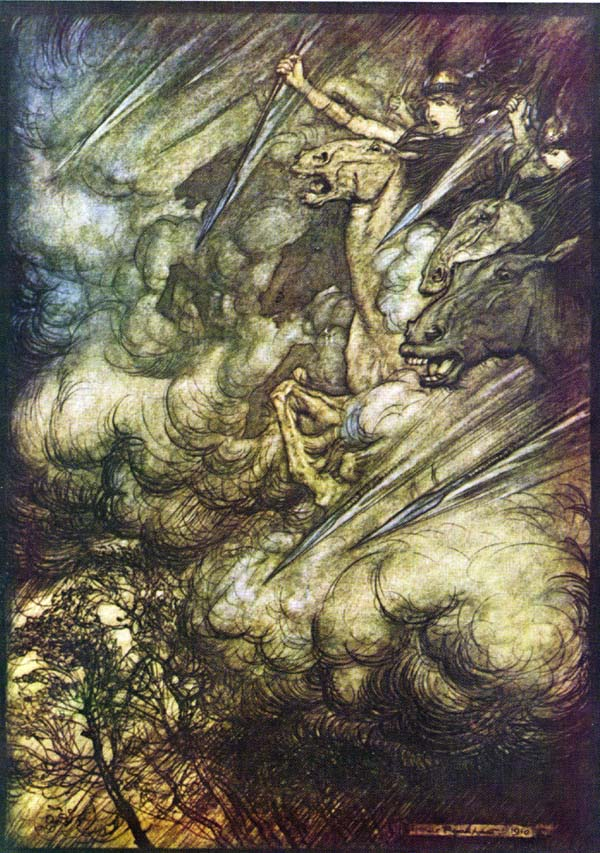
Arthur Rackham's illustration to The Ride of the Valkyries

The Ride of the Valkyries (German: Walkürenritt or Ritt der Walküren) is the popular name of the prelude to the first scene of the third and last act of Die Walküre, the second of the four epic music dramas that constitute the operatic cycle Der Ring des Nibelungen (English: The Ring of the Nibelung), composed by Richard Wagner.

"Ride of the Valkyries" (2:20)
A 2022 recording, conducted by Philip Milman.

As a separate piece, the "Ride" is often heard in a purely instrumental version, which may be as short as three minutes. Together with the "Bridal Chorus" from Lohengrin, the "Ride of the Valkyries" is one of Wagner's best-known pieces.

== Context ==
The main theme of the "Ride", the leitmotif labelled Walkürenritt, was first written down by the composer on 23 July 1851. The preliminary draft for the "Ride" was composed in 1854 as part of the composition of the entire opera, which was fully orchestrated by the end of March 1856.

In the Walküre opera, the "Ride", which takes around eight minutes, begins in the prelude to the third act, building up successive layers of accompaniment until the curtain rises to reveal a mountain peak where four of the eight Valkyrie sisters of Brünnhilde have gathered in preparation for the transportation of fallen heroes to Valhalla. As they are joined by the other four, the familiar tune is carried by the orchestra, while, above it, the Valkyries greet each other and sing their battle-cry. Apart from the song of the Rhinemaidens in Das Rheingold, it is the only ensemble piece in the first three operas of Wagner's Ring cycle.

== Performance history ==
The complete opera Die Walküre was first performed on 26 June 1870 in the National Theatre Munich against the composer's intent. By January of the next year, Wagner was receiving requests for the "Ride" to be performed separately, but wrote that such a performance should be considered "an utter indiscretion" and forbade "any such thing". However, the piece was still printed and sold in Leipzig, and Wagner wrote a complaint to the publisher Schott. In the period up to the first performance of the complete Ring cycle, Wagner continued to receive requests for separate performances, his second wife Cosima noting "Unsavoury letters arrive for R. – requests for the Ride of the Valkyries and I don't know what else." Once the Ring had been performed in Bayreuth in 1876, Wagner lifted the embargo. He himself conducted it in London on 12 May 1877, repeating it as an encore.

== Outside opera ==
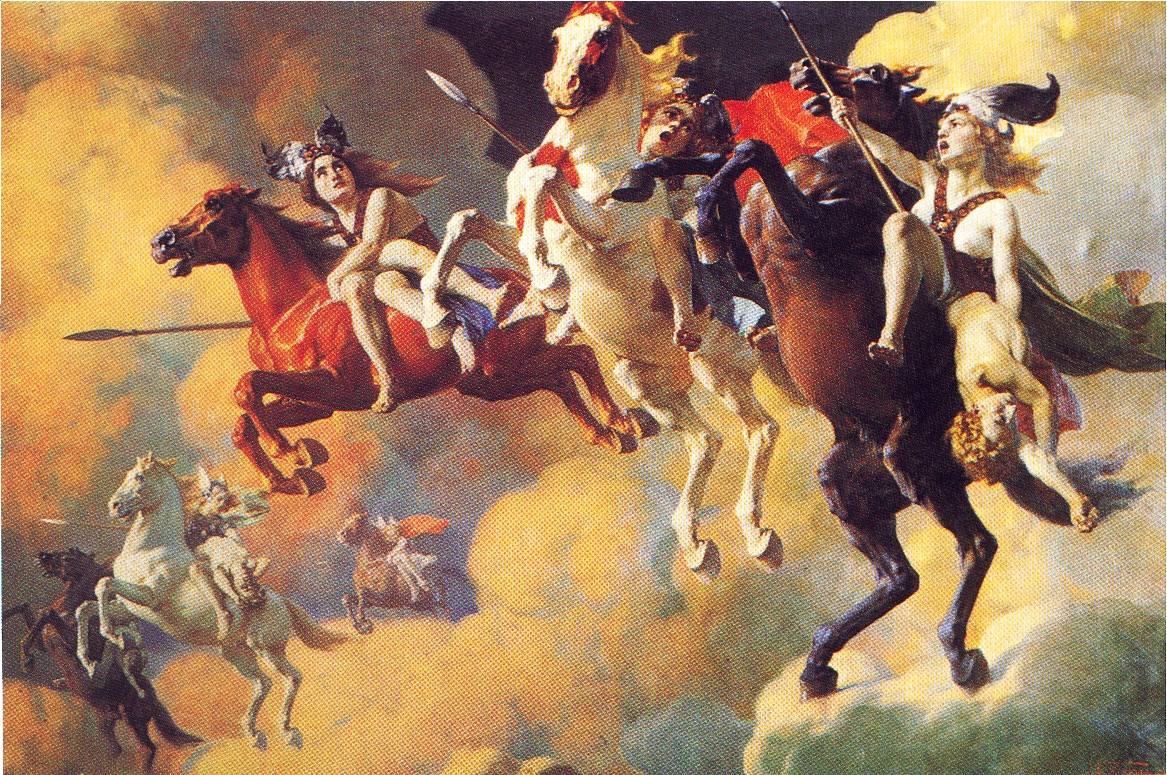
Ride of the Valkyries, Cesare Viazzi

The 1941 Battle of Crete saw German airborne operations with paratroopers. Die Deutsche Wochenschau newsreel of 1941-06-04 used Walkürenritt as soundtrack to Junkers Ju 52 airplanes approaching the island at dawn in low flight over the Mediterranean Sea. In similar style, in Apocalypse Now (1979), helicopters attack a Vietnamese village with "Ride of the Valkyries" playing on loudspeakers.

Other uses in film include the score for 8 1/2 , The Birth of a Nation (1915) and What's Opera, Doc? (1957).
