= Palazzo Gerolamo Grimaldi =

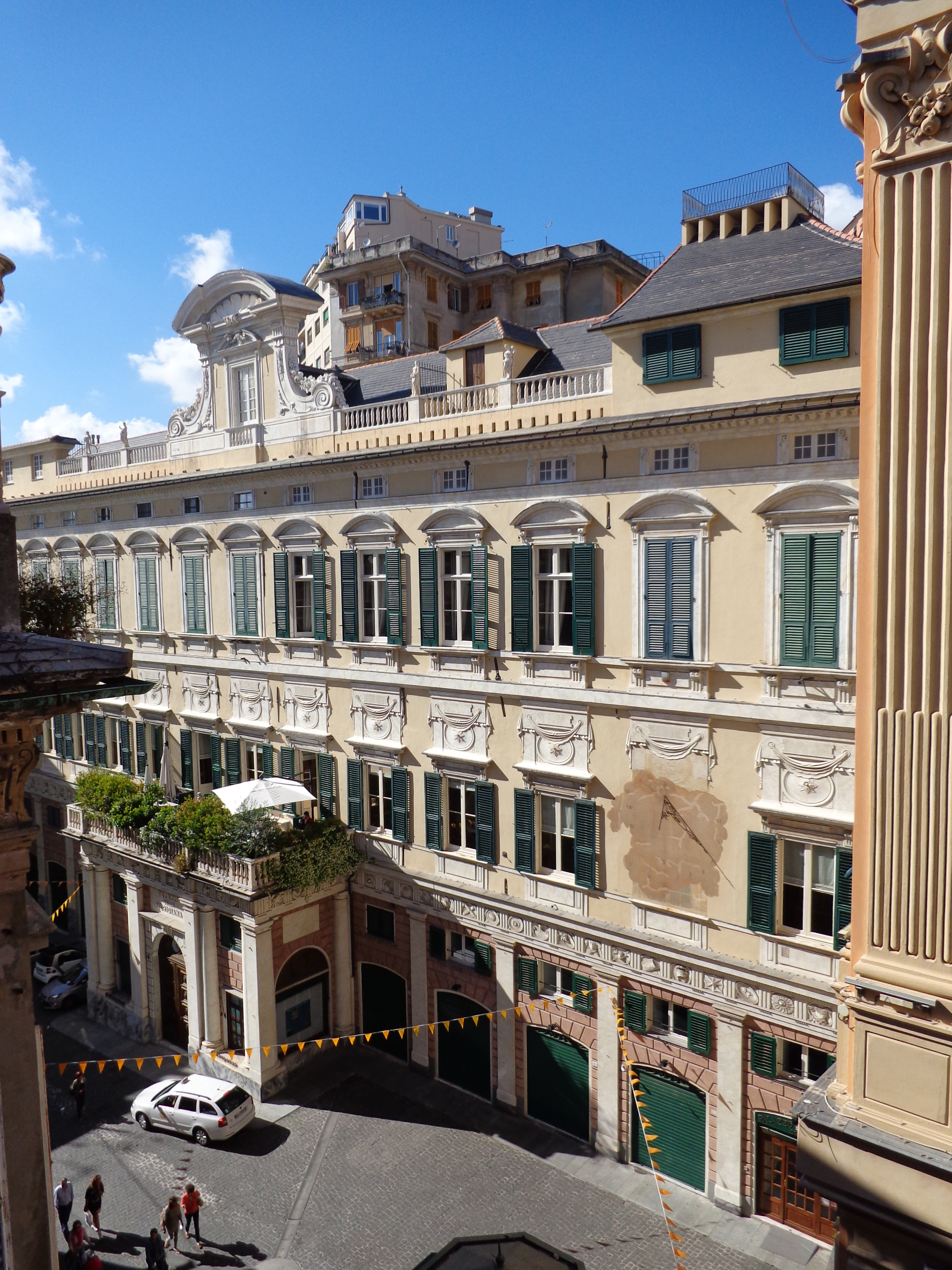
- Facade of the Palazzo Gerolamo Grimaldi in via Salita di San Francesco 4
- Interactive map of the Palazzo Gerolamo Grimaldi area
- Alternative names: Palazzo della Meridiana

General information
- Status: In use
- Type: Palace
- Architectural style: Mannerist
- Location: Genoa, Italy, 4 Salita di San Francesco
- Coordinates: 44.4117°N 8.93151°E
- Construction started: 1536
- Completed: 1544
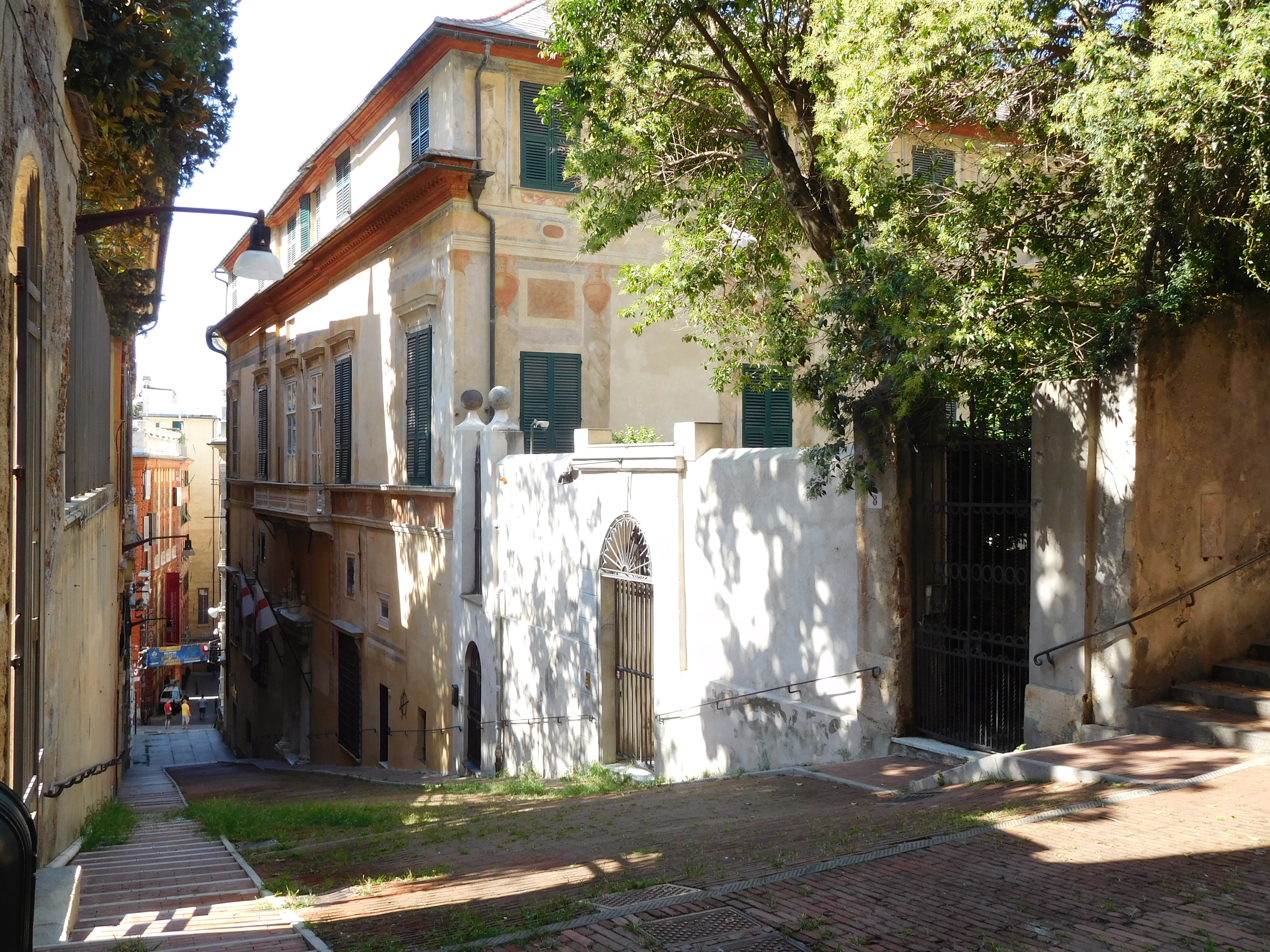

UNESCO World Heritage Site
- Part of: Genoa: Le Strade Nuove and the system of the Palazzi dei Rolli
- Criteria: Cultural: (ii)(iv)
- Reference: 1211
- Inscription: 2006 (30th Session)

The Palazzo Gerolamo Grimaldi also known as the palazzo della Meridiana is a building located in the salita di San Francesco at number 4 in the historical centre of Genoa, included on 13 July 2006 in the list of the forty-two palaces inscribed in the Rolli di Genova that became World Heritage by UNESCO on that date.

== History and description ==
It was built between 1536 and 1544 by the Genoese banker Gerolamo Grimaldi Oliva, who had become rich in Portugal and Spain where he managed the collection of taxes in Cordoba and Granada. At the time of its construction it stood in an area of little urbanisation and considerable slope, with access and main façade on the salita di San Francesco di Castelletto, as well as two side elevations facing upstream and downstream gardens, much praised by the architect Joseph Fürttenbach. The frescoes on the north façade, still visible today, depicting the Labours of Hercules have been attributed to Aurelio Busso.

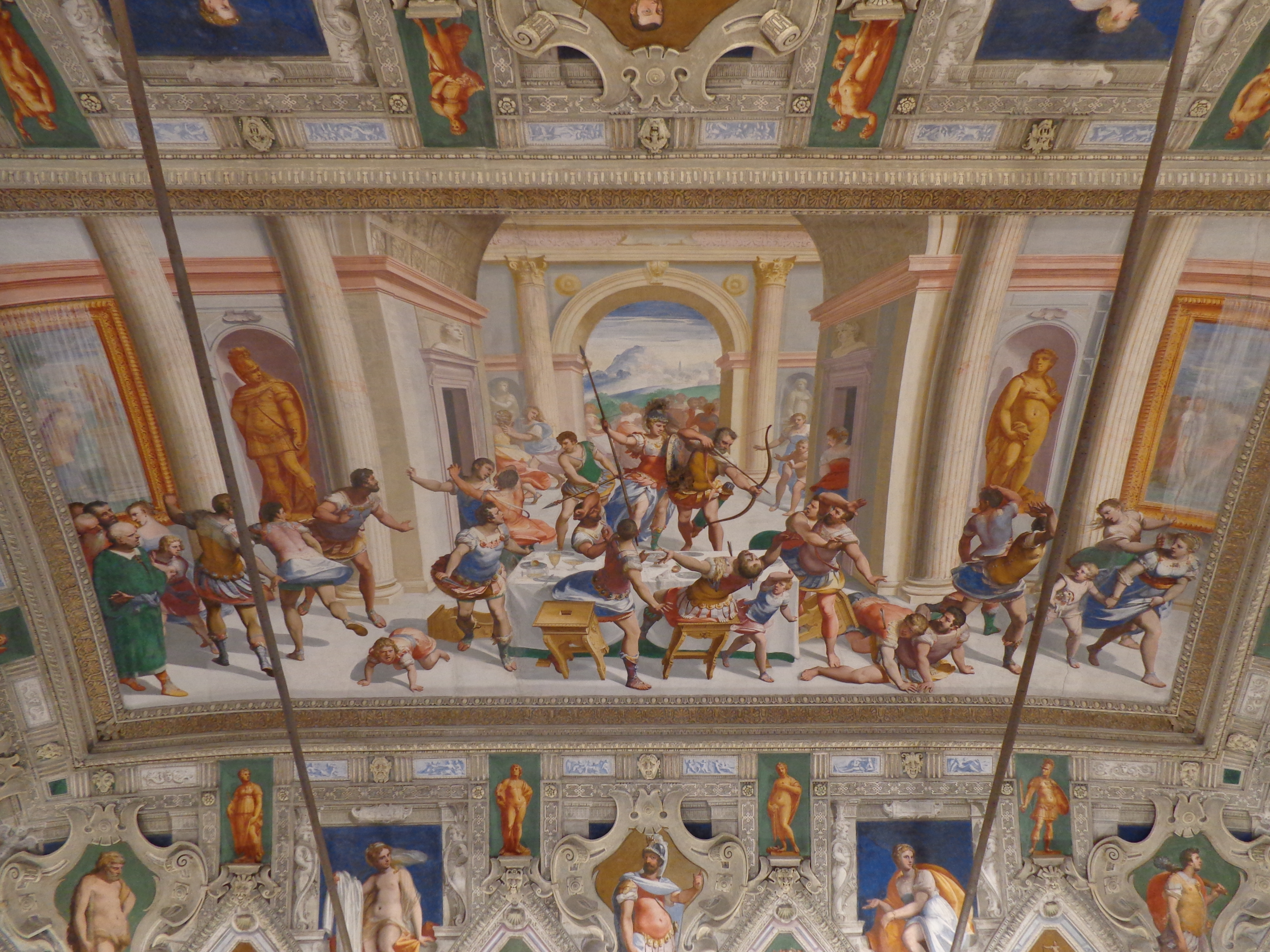
Luca Cambiaso, Ulysses saves the Proci

The fresco decoration of many interior rooms by Luca Cambiaso, Giovanni Battista Castello, Lazzaro Calvi and others was started between 1556 and 1566 under the commission of Gerolamo's son, Giovanni Battista Grimaldi, owner of the famous villa Grimaldi detta La Fortezza in Sampierdarena.

The 15th-century building, with its dual character of a decentralised city palace and a suburban villa residence, holds in its extraordinary ambiguity the secret genesis of an architectural renovation that few have so far clearly denounced in its ancestry.

=== The 18th-century façade on Strada Nuovissima ===
The opening of Strada Nuovissima (1778—1786, today's Via Cairoli) required the excavation of the lower garden and the reconstruction of the south façade, with the addition by Giacomo Brusco of a covered forepart surmounted by a terrace and a sundial painted on the façade, to which the current name Palazzo della Meridiana is owed. Evidence of the original 16th-century façade remains in Rubens' edition of Palazzi di Genova (1652). In the case of the sundial palace, Rubens decided to depict the façade on the garden instead of the main façade, as in the other palaces illustrated, as the elevation on the salita di San Francesco is irregular due to the slope of the land. This elevation has also changed from the original 16th-century one, which at the height of the marble balcony on the piano nobile had a deep recess in the centre corresponding to the open courtyard below. Today's appearance dates back to 1697, when the central loggia covered the first courtyard and converted it into a closed atrium.

On the whole, today's palace is very different from the original, which comprised two internal loggia courtyards and was surrounded by gardens, characterised by the alternation of open and covered spaces: from the entrance portico a visual telescope framed the small garden to the west with a large nymphaeum, water features and automata through an alternation of spaces barely interrupted by the perspective plays of the colonnades.

=== The restoration of the Coppedè ===
After three centuries of belonging to the Grimaldi Oliva family, in 1835 Gio Agostino sold the palazzo to Paolo Sebastiano Odero. At the beginning of the 20th century, Evan Mackenzie, representative in Genoa of Lloyd's of London, commissioned the Florentine architect Gino Coppedè to adapt the palazzo as an office building. On this occasion, in addition to new buildings in the rear garden area, the courtyard was covered with a stained-glass skylight, at the centre of which stand the symbols of the cities of Rome, Venice and Turin, and the tempera decorations of the vaults and several rooms were made by the Apulian painter Nicola Mascialino, of Neo-Renaissance architecture, who also intervened heavily in the interior decoration of rooms where there are frescoes by Luca Cambiaso (Ulysses who thunders the Proci, Episodes from the Odyssey, Satyr mocked by Cupid) and Lazzaro Calvi (Apollo on the Chariot).

When Italy entered the war in May 1915, the Mackenzie family made some rooms in the Palazzo della Meridiana available to be converted into a hospital for Italian officers. In the 1960s it housed the Genoa Conservatory.

In the last century, it has been used several times as a public building with subsequent partitioning and rebuilding.

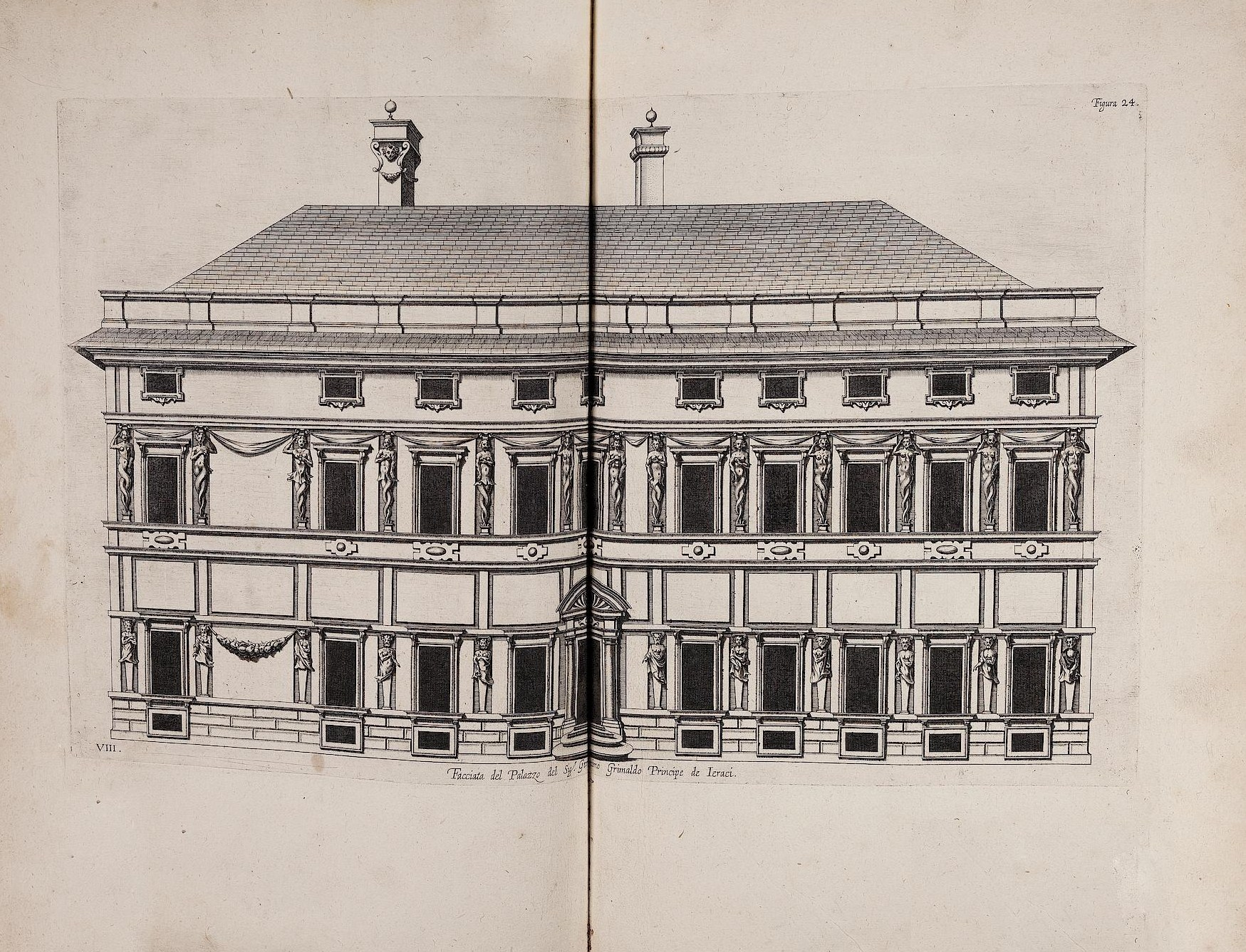
PP. Rubens, Palazzi di Genova, 1652. Fronte sul giardino

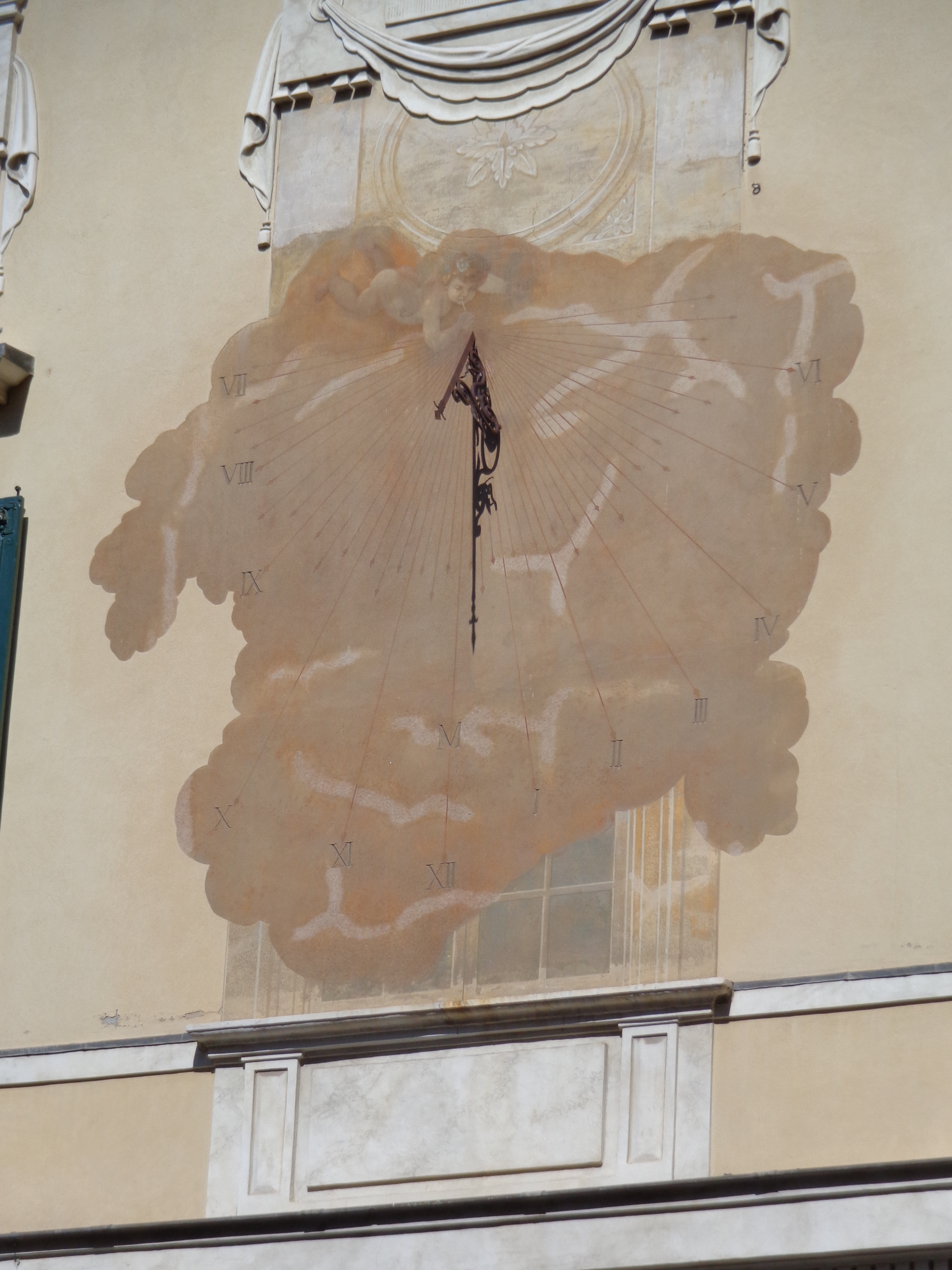
Detail of the sundial

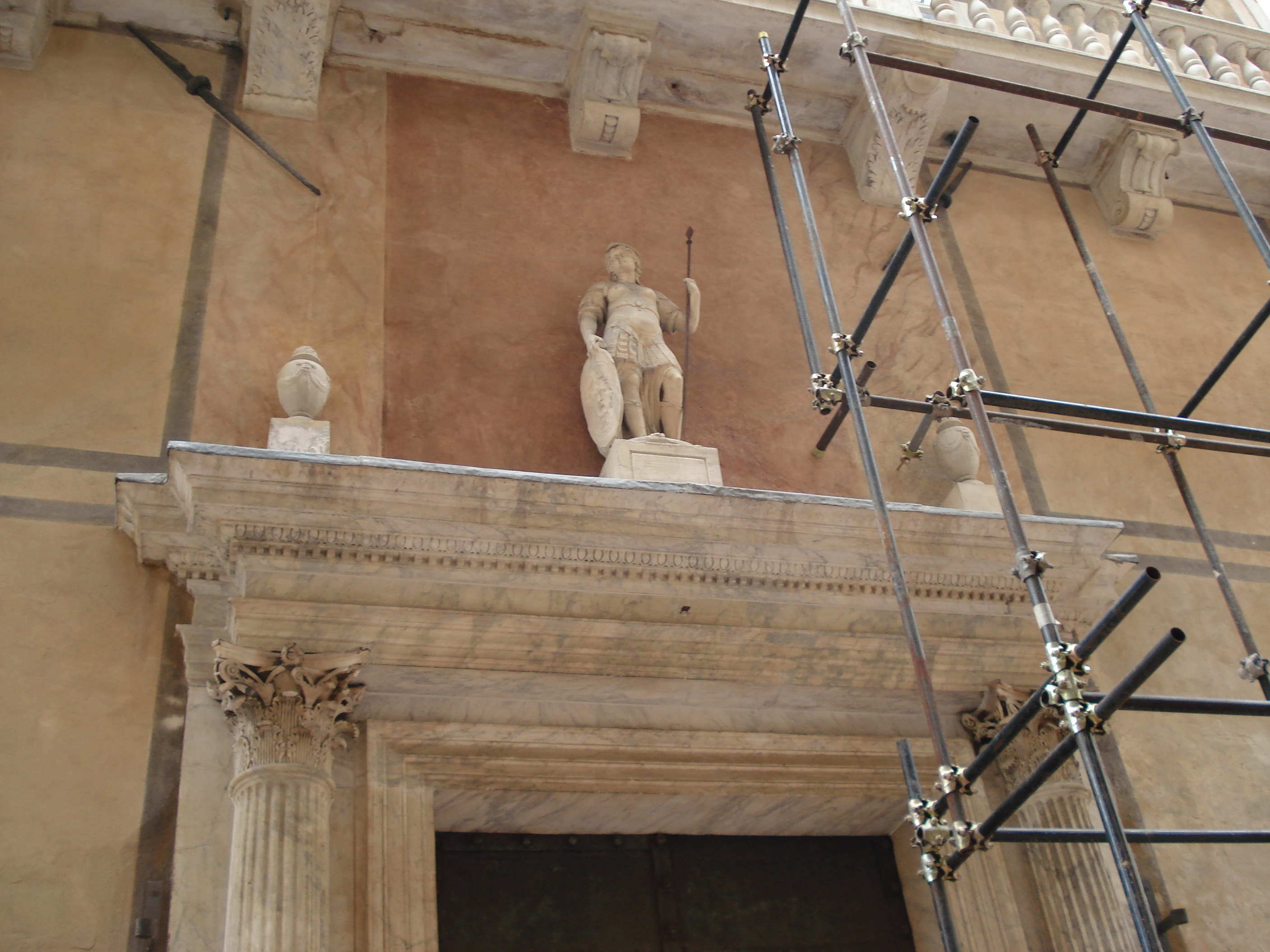
Detail of the portal on Salita di San Francesco

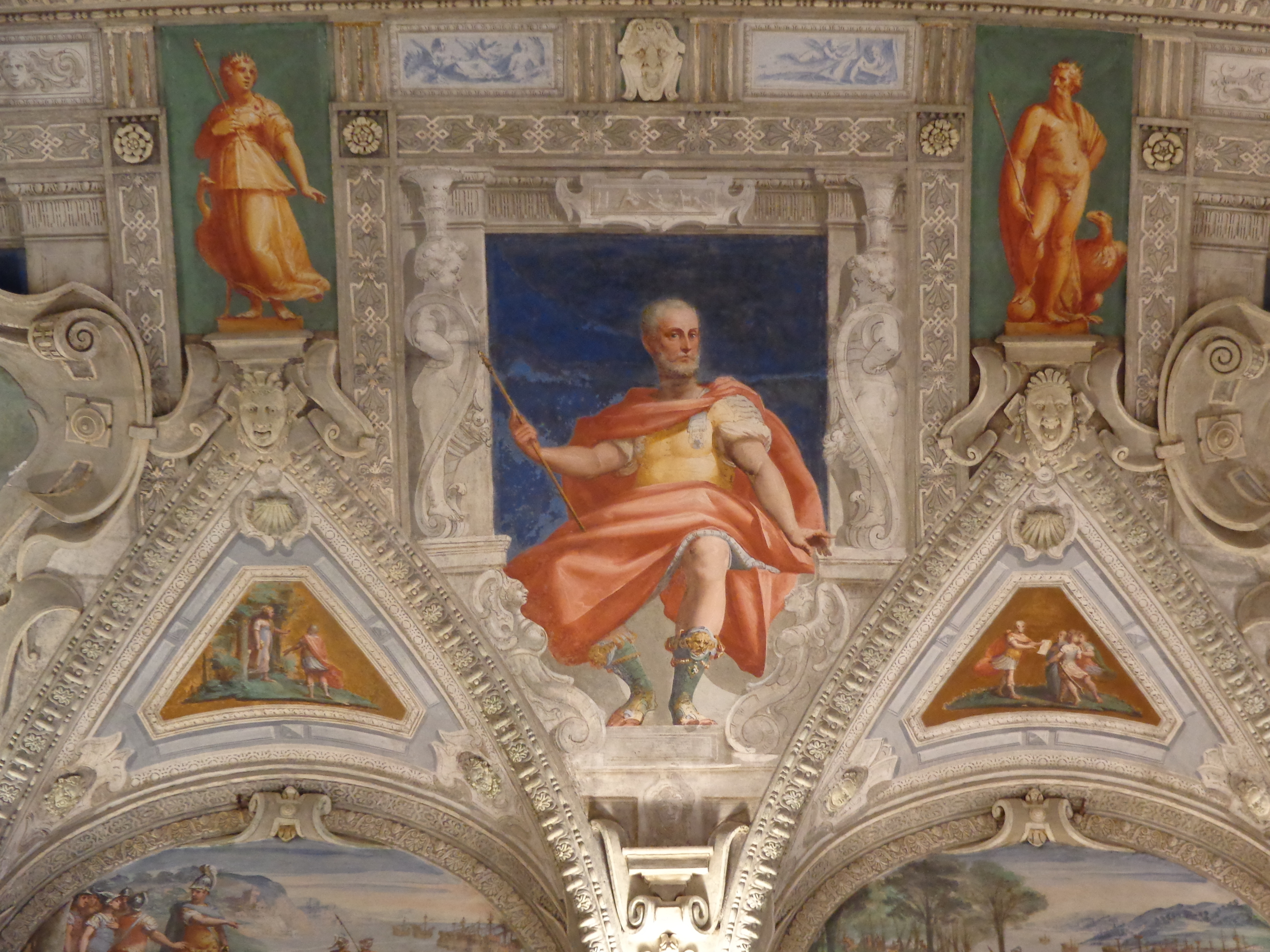
Luca Cambiaso, Gerolamo Grimaldi as a condottiere, fresco in the Ulysses Room

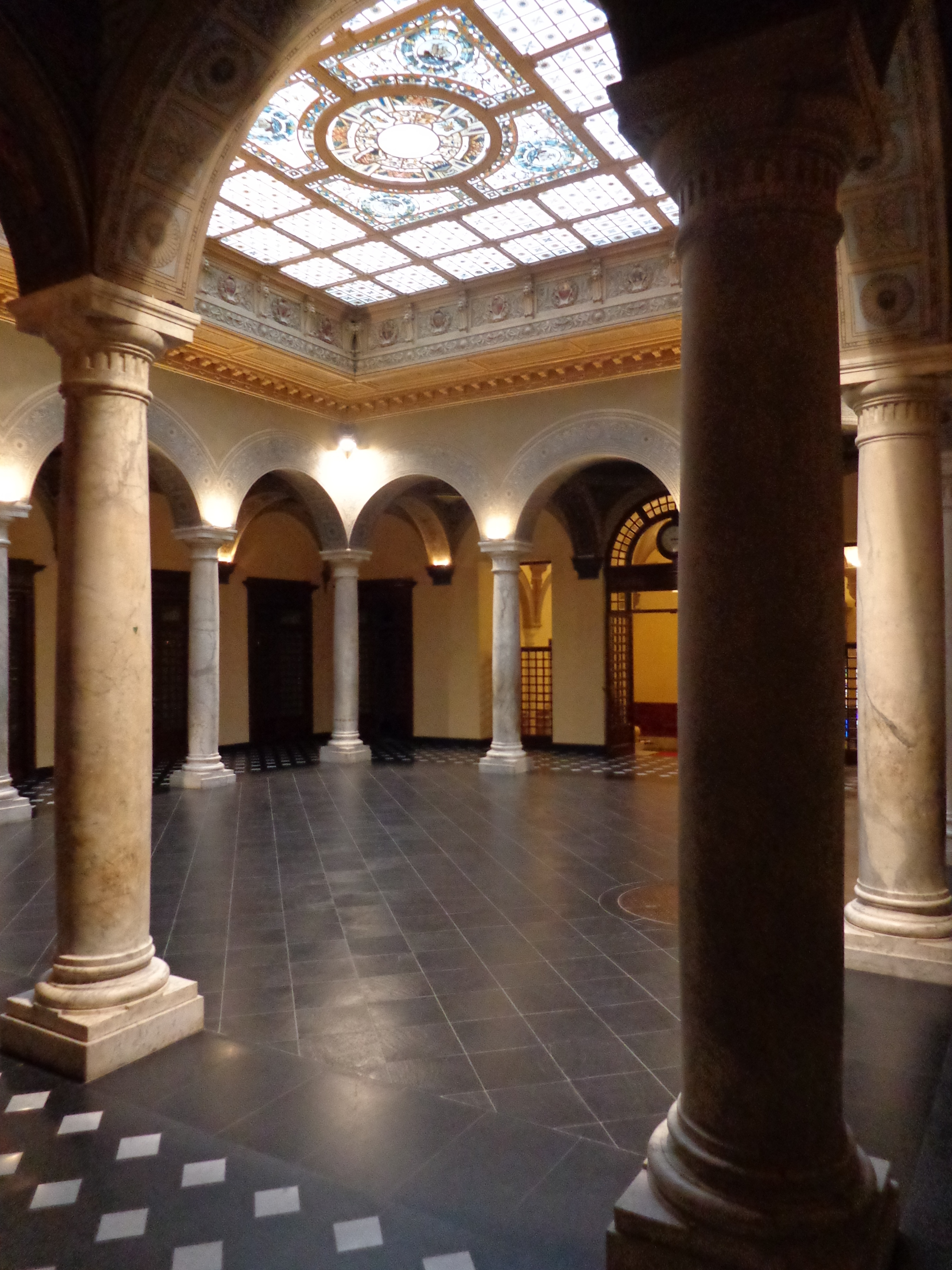
Atrium, Coppedè decoration

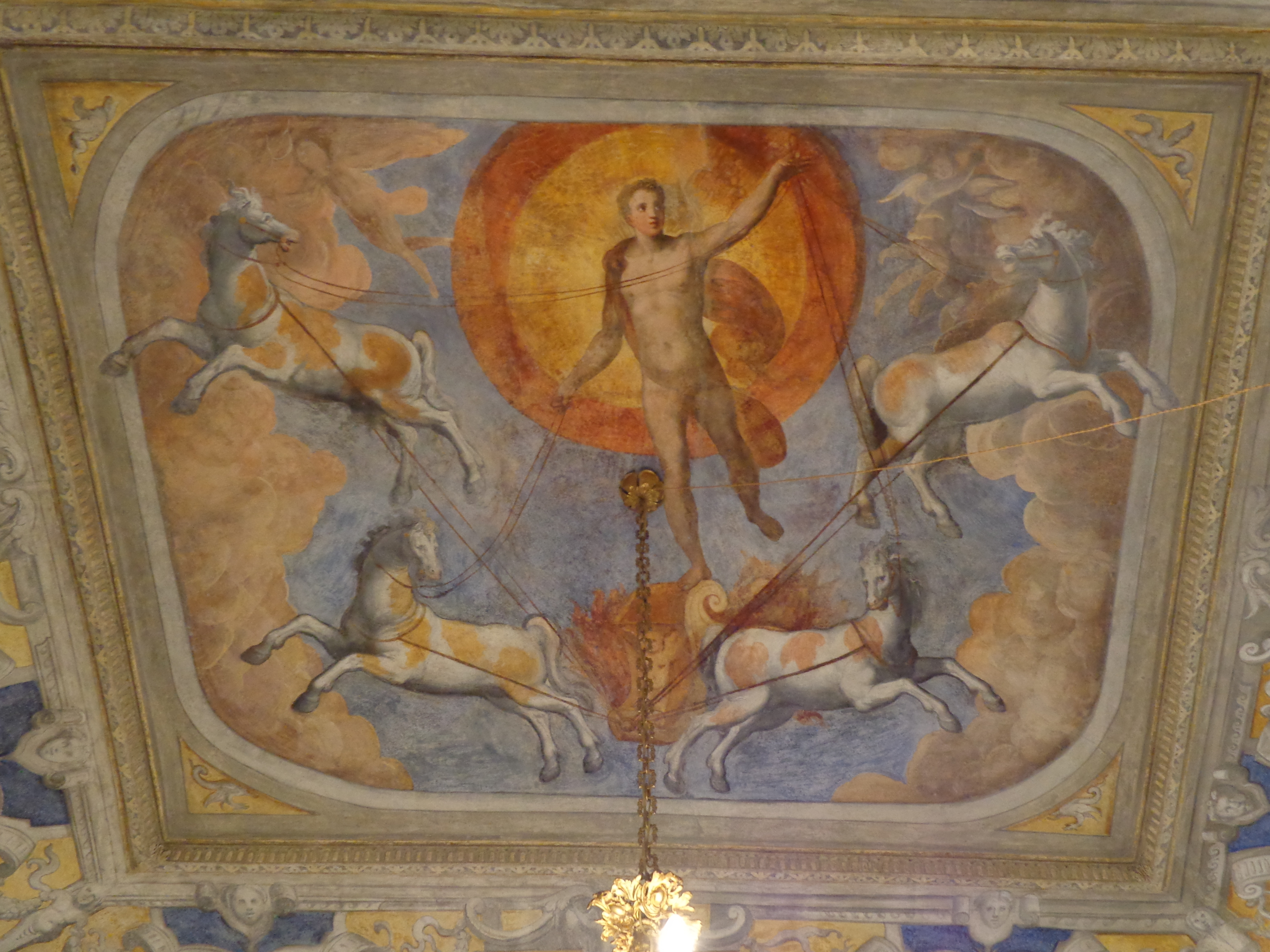
Apollo on the Chariot by Lazzaro Calvi

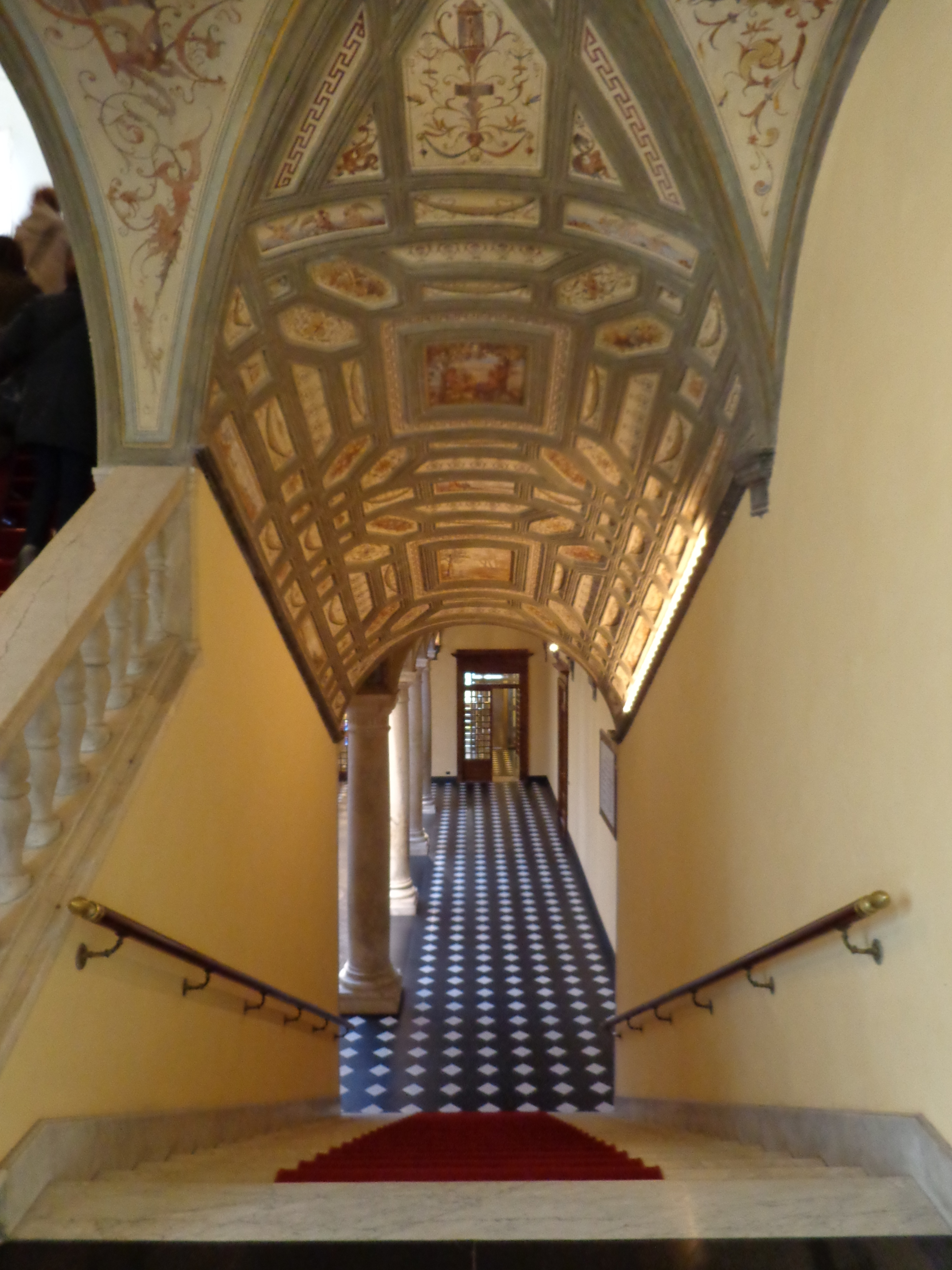
The staircase

== Bibliography ==
=== Italian sources ===
- E. Poleggi, Genova. Una civiltà di Palazzi, Cinisello Balsamo (Milano) 2002, pp. 37–42 (Palazzo di Gerolamo e Battista Grimaldi olim Oliva (1536 circa – 1545))
- E. Poleggi, L’invenzione dei Rolli, catalogo della mostra, Genova 2004
- G. Bozzo; L. Magnani; G. Rossini, Palazzo Grimaldi della Meridiana. Una dimora aristocratica genovese, Genova 2010
