= Genoa Conservatory =

Musical educational facility in Genoa, Italy (1829–present)

Coordinates: 44°24′0″N 8°57′38″E

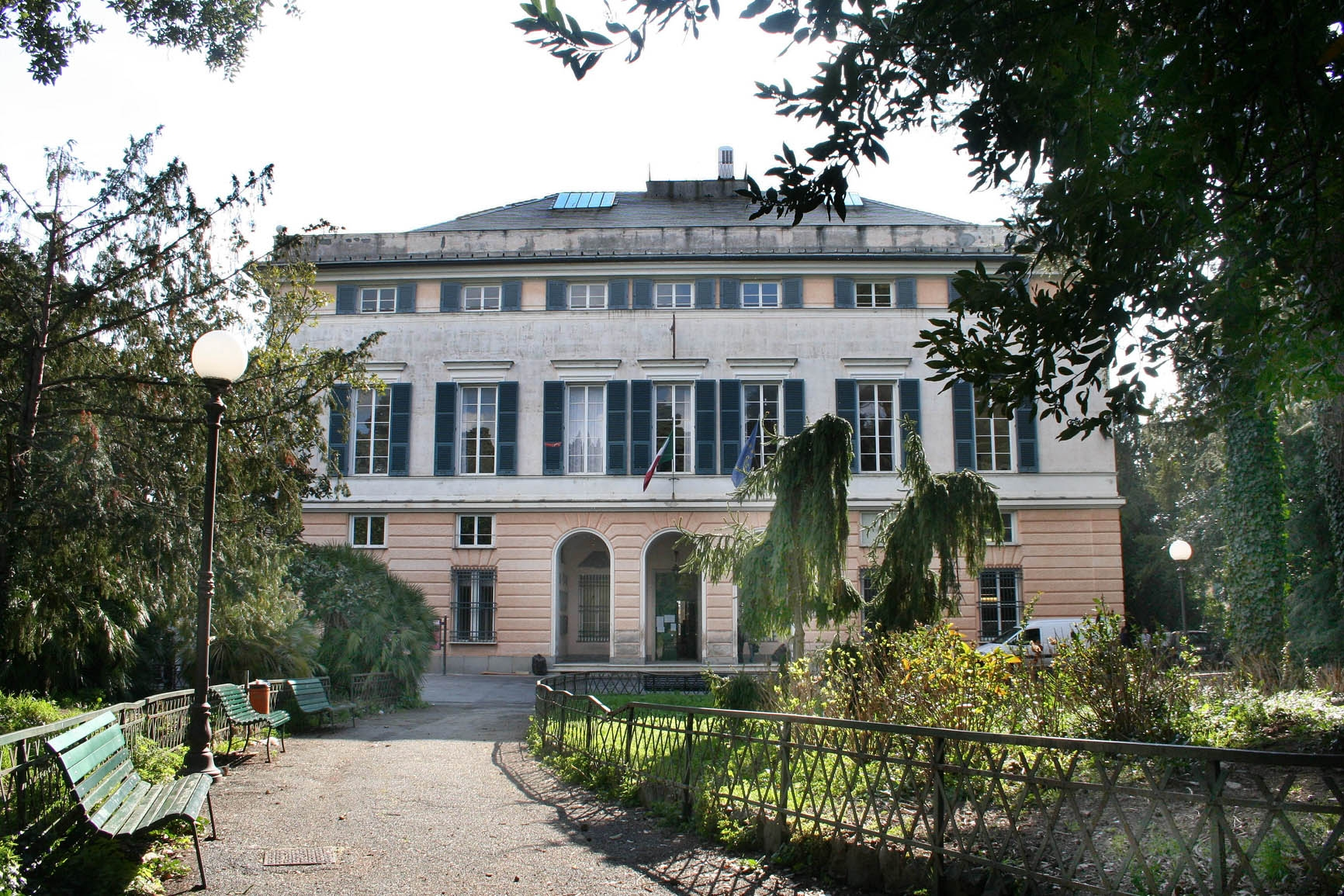
The Villa Sauli Bombrini Doria where the Genoa Conservatory has resided since 1970.

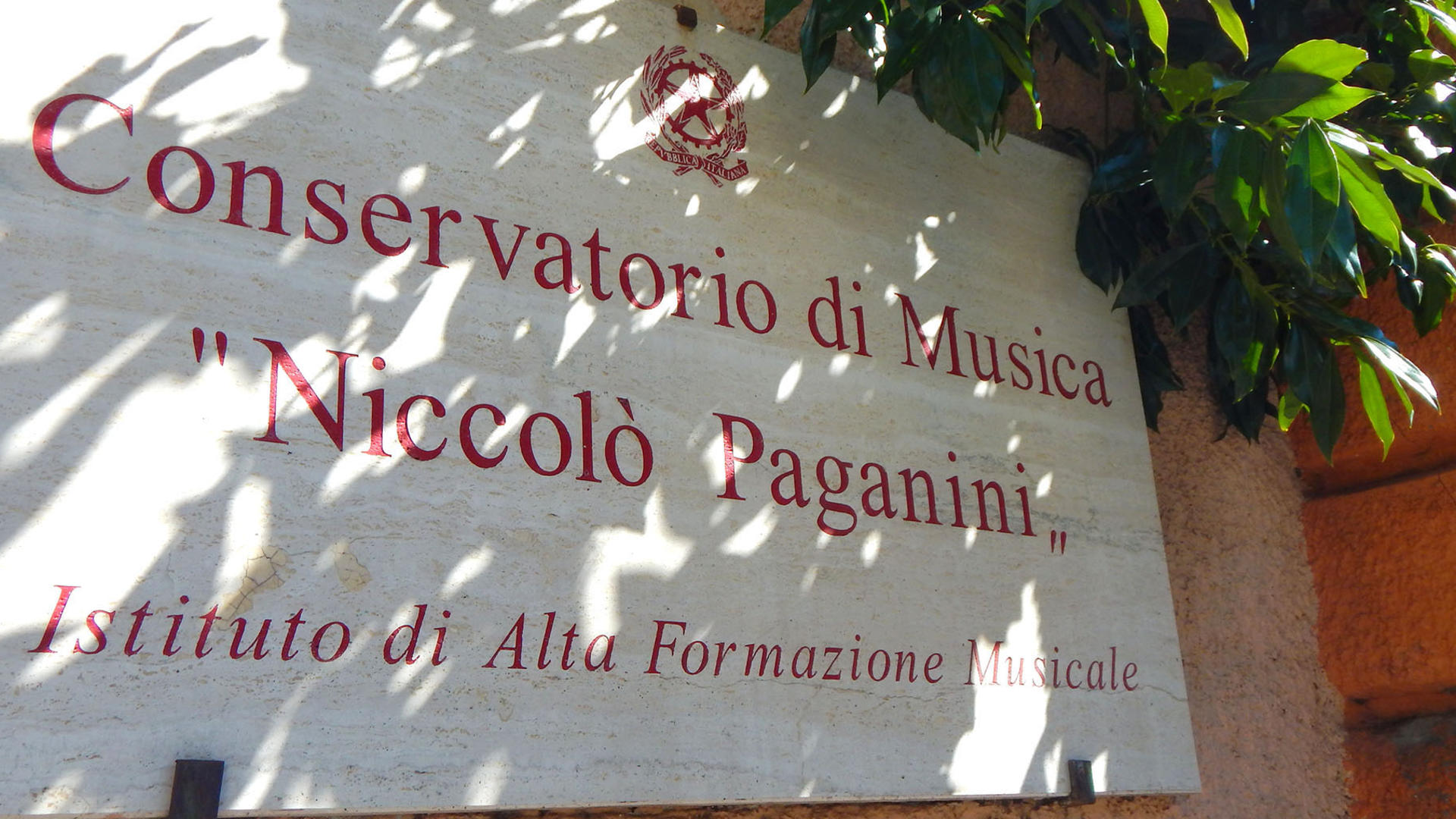
The marble plaque at the entrance of the architectural complex

The Conservatorio Niccolò Paganini (English: Conservatory of Music Niccolò Paganini), better known in English as the Genoa Conservatory, is a music conservatory in Genoa, Italy. The school was founded in 1829 as the Scuola Gratuita di Canto, and was originally intended as a private institution to train singers performing at the Teatro Carlo Felice. When instrumental music instruction was added in 1830 the school's name was changed to the Istituto di Musica – Scuola gratuita di Canto e Strumentale. After evolving into a public music conservatory operated by the Government of Genoa in 1849, the school was renamed the Civico Istituto Musicale. In 1904 its name was changed again in honor of the composer Niccolò Paganini. Since 1933 the institution has operated as a national conservatory managed by the Ministry of Public Education of the Government of Italy.

The Genoa Conservatory has been housed in several different locations during its history; often in buildings formerly used as religious spaces. Originally located in a building near the Chiesa di Nostra Signora delle Grazie in the Molo neighborhood of Genoa, the conservatory moved into the facilities of the former monastery attached to that church in 1834. It remained at that location until 1866 when the conservatory relocated to the premises of the San Filippo Neri, Genoa; inhabiting the former church until it was reclaimed by the Holy See in 1928. The conservatory was then located at another former church, the Sant'Agostino, Genoa, from 1928 to 1936. The school relocated to the Villa Raggio in the Albaro neighborhood until it was forced to evacuate temporarily to the Villa Saluzzo Serra art museum in the Genoese neighborhood of Nervi during World War II for safety reasons. It returned to the Villa Raggio during the war only to be forced to cohabitate with military forces when the Villa Raggio was requisitioned by the Wehrmacht of Nazi Germany and later by the military forces of the Allied Powers. After the war the conservatory continued to operate in the Villa Raggio, but left there to reside temporarily in the Palazzo Gerolamo Grimaldi during the 1960s. Since 1970 the conservatory has been located at the Villa Sauli Bombrini Doria in Albaro, Genoa.

== Early history as a private school: 1829–1849 ==
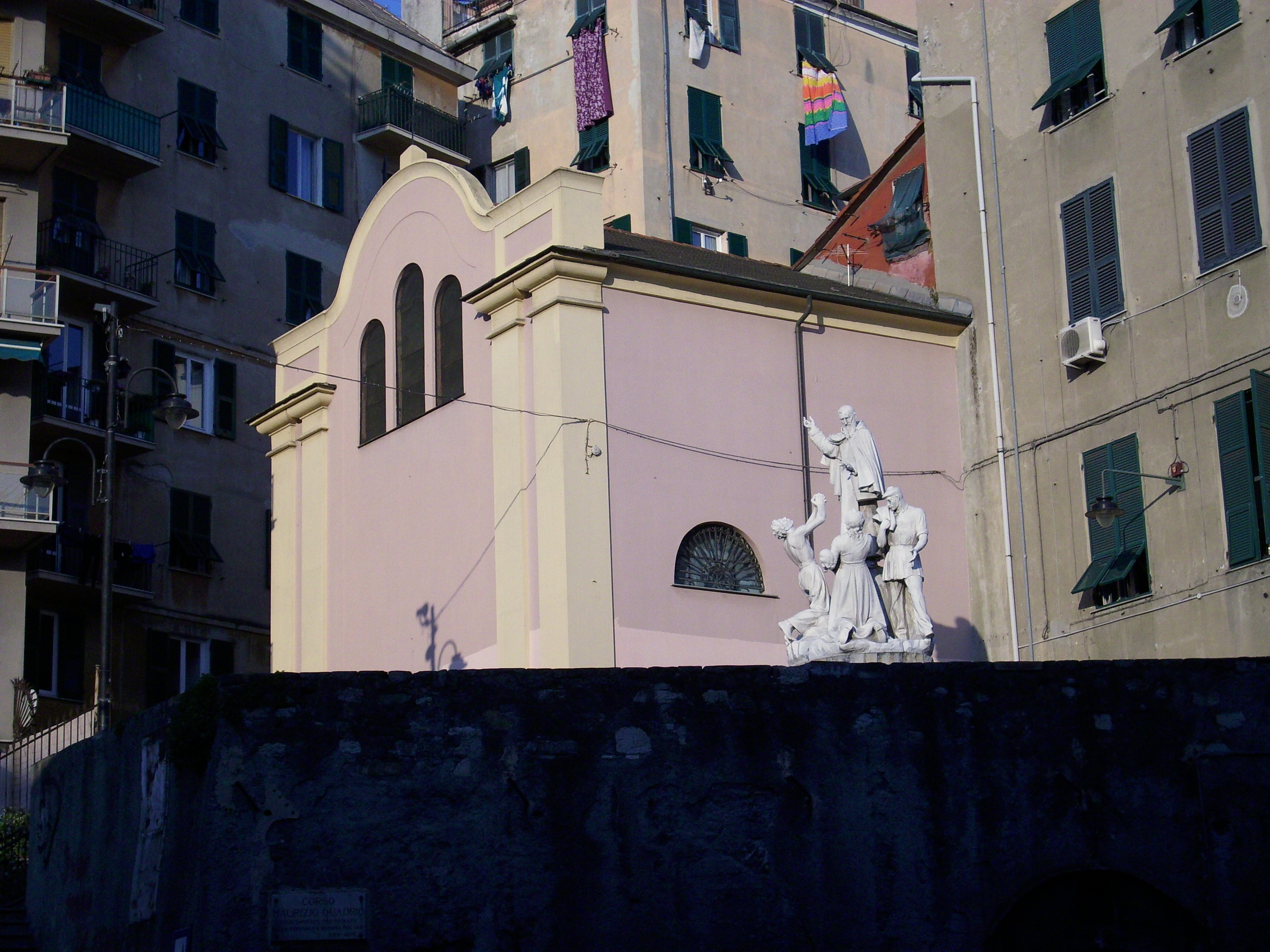
The outside of the Chiesa di Nostra Signora delle Grazie in Molo, Genoa.

The Genoa Conservatory was founded as the Scuola Gratuita di Canto in 1829 by Antonio Costa. Originally the school was created as a private institution with the intent of training singers who were performing in operas at the Teatro Carlo Felice. Instrumental music instruction was added in the school's second year of operation, and in 1830 the school's name was changed to the Istituto di Musica – Scuola gratuita di Canto e Strumentale. One of the school's initial pupils was Michele Novaro who later gained fame for composing "Il Canto degli Italiani", the national anthem of Italy. The school's first public concert was a performance of Wolfgang Amadeus Mozart's Requiem led by conductor Nicolò Uccelli on 17 June 1830. It was a memorial concert following the death of one of the school's benefactors, the Italian general and former Genoese governor Ettore Veuillet d'Yenne.

The Genoa Conservatory was first located in a now demolished building near the Chiesa di Nostra Signora delle Grazie in the Molo neighborhood of Genoa, and in November 1834 the school moved into the premises of the former monastery attached to that church. In January 1849 Antonio Costa died and he bequeathed his significant music library, collection of musical instruments, and other items, such as furniture, to the city of Genoa. Costa's musical manuscripts are still part of the collection at the Genoa Conservatory's music library. After Costa's death, the impresario Francesco Sanguineti became interim director of the school while a decision was made over the future direction of the institution. The disastrous defeat at the Battle of Novara in March 1849 during the First Italian War of Independence further imperiled the future of the school as the economic and political situation in Genoa worsened. However, a group of Genoese citizens led by the president of the school's trustees, Nicolò Sauli, stabilized the finances of the institution through raising charitable funds.

== Early years as a public institution: 1849–1865 ==
In his role as deputy mayor of Genoa, the civil servant and composer Francesco Viani (1809–1877) spearheaded the transformation of the school into a larger public music conservatory operated by the government of Genoa at which point the conservatory was renamed the Civico Istituto Musicale. The school was officially made into a public institution on Christmas Eve of 1849. Viani also established a professional civic orchestra operated by the government of Genoa which also took over the management of the Teatro Carlo Felice; creating a trio of publicly operated music institutions in Genoa that contributed greatly to the culture of the city beginning in the middle of the 19th century.

In 1850 the composer, conductor, and violinist Giovanni Serra (1787–1876) was appointed director of the Genoa Conservatory; a position offered to him only after it was refused first by composer Carlo Andrea Gambini (1819–1865) and then by composer Placido Mandanici. Mandanici, who had been teaching on the faculty of the conservatory, had been appointed director of the conservatory at a Genoa city council meeting without being consulted, and promptly resigned from the faculty upon learning that he had been made the director without his consent. Under Serra's leadership the school expanded its class offerings to include courses in music theory, solfège, piano performance, and chamber music; and Serra established a chair position in counterpoint at the conservatory in addition to maintaining the school's reputation as one of Italy's best schools for vocalists.

== San Filippo Neri and Sant'Agostino: 1866–1936 ==
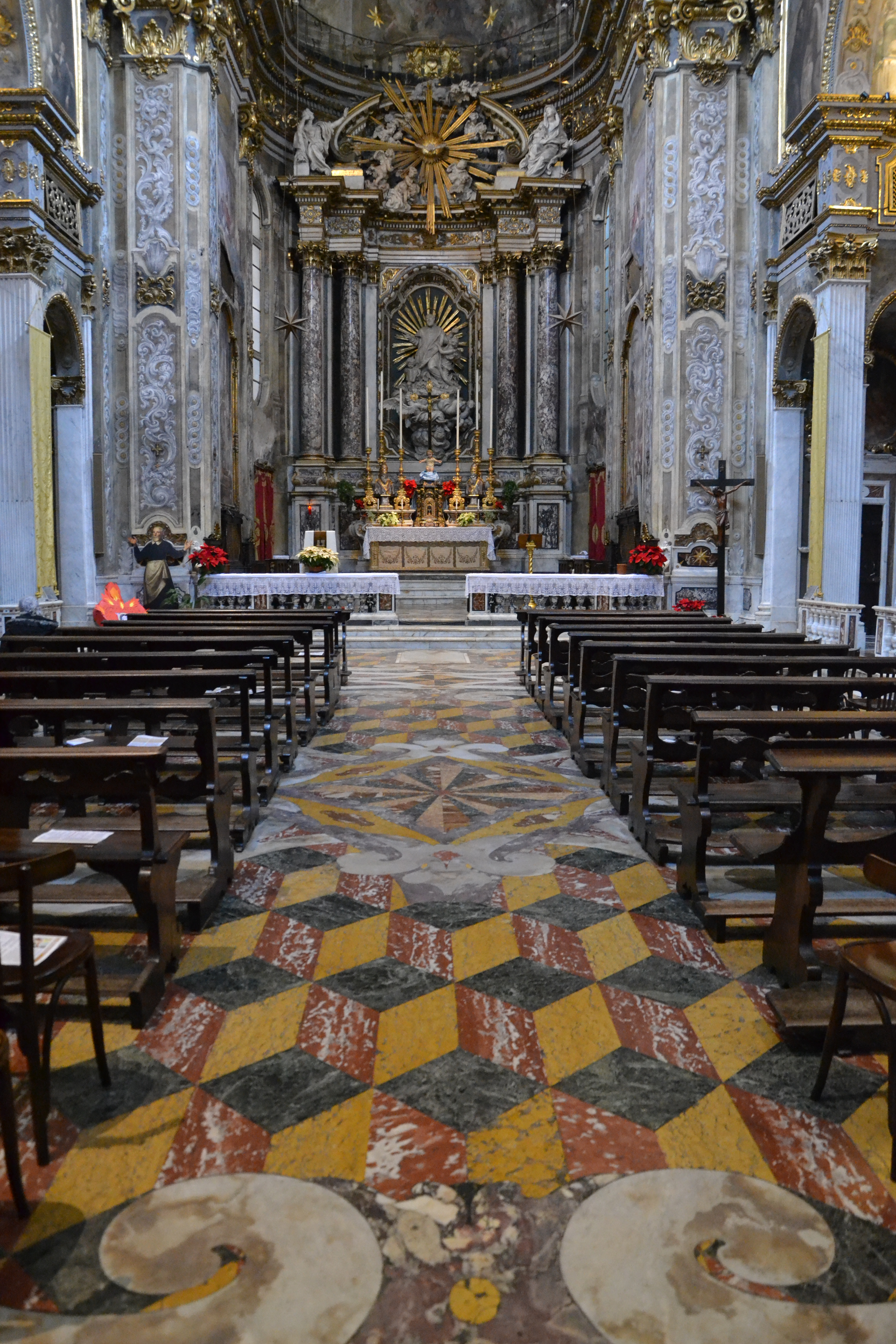
The nave of the San Filippo Neri which was used by the Genoa Conservatory as their concert hall while they were the residents of the church.

In 1866 the Genoa Conservatory relocated to the premises of the San Filippo Neri, Genoa, a former church established by the Oratory of Saint Philip Neri, and in 1872 Serra retired from his position as director. Giuseppe Verdi declined the offer of succeeding Serra as director of the Genoa Conservatory, but recommended that Serafino Amedeo De Ferrari be appointed to the position in his place. De Ferrari was appointed director in 1873 in conjunction with several changes made by the Government of Genoa to the conservatory's governing structure.

In 1882 the school was put under the administration of Genoa's public education office, having previously been managed by the Genoa government's bursar's office. This move proved fortuitous as the bursar's office had opposed many education reforms petitioned by De Ferrari in previous years, and had made controversial cuts to programming to save money in the 1870s; including cutting many of the courses offered to female students as well as removing piano instruction. When the public education department took over the management of the school, the classes for women and for piano were immediately restored, and ultimately many of Ferrari's reforms were approved in 1884 just months before his death in March 1885; including establishment of an academic chair for music composition.

Verdi was once again consulted in the selection process of a new director for the Genoa Conservatory, and upon his recommendation the composer, conductor, and pianist Vincenzo Maria Noberasco succeeded De Ferrari as director in 1885. In 1896 Carlo Del Signore succeeded Noberasco as director following Noberasco's death. Del Signore died eight months into his tenure as director, and he was succeeded by composer Giovanni Battista Polleri (1855–1923) who was appointed to the position in January 1898 by a search committee that included composer Giacomo Puccini. Polleri remained the director for the next twenty-five years, over-seeing a period of substantial growth in which the conservatory underwent an academic transformation and earned a reputation as one of Italy's leading music conservatories. On 6 April 1904, the conservatory was renamed the "Conservatorio Niccolò Paganini" after the famous Genoese composer.

After Polleri's death in 1923, pianist Pasquale Montani became director of the Genoa Conservatory. During his tenure he acquired several instruments made by the Italian luthier Cesare Candi for the conservatory and significantly expanded the library's holdings of music manuscripts and scholarly materials. In 1928 a change in laws enacted by the Holy See resulted in the return of the San Filippo Neri, Genoa to the Oratory of Saint Philip Neri, and the conservatory was forced to find new premises. From 1928 through 1936 the conservatory inhabited the Sant'Agostino, Genoa; using the former sanctuary as a concert hall and transforming adjacent rooms and annexed buildings into classrooms. In 1933 the conservatory obtained the status as national conservatory of music operated by the Government of Italy after successfully completing a review by the Ministry of Public Education led by Ildebrando Pizzetti.

== The Villa Raggio, Villa Serra, and World War II: 1936–1945 ==
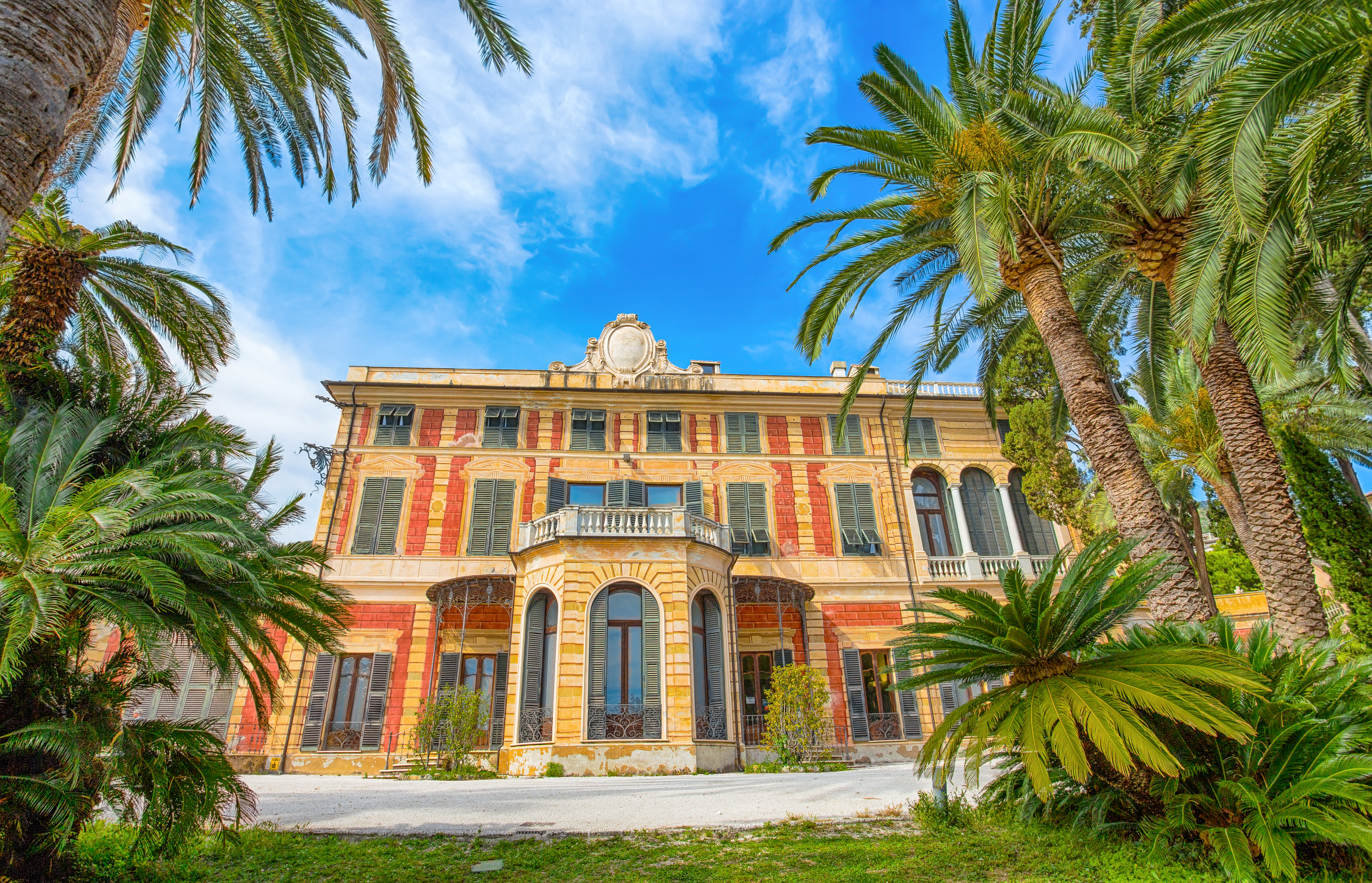
Villa Saluzzo Serra

In September 1936 the Genoa Conservatory relocated to the Villa Raggio in the Albaro neighborhood of the city. The events of World War II in Italy had a significant impact on the school's students, staff, and physical premises during the 1940s. War rationing and supply interruptions made it difficult to obtain heating fuel and the school had to close longer in the colder months. Other factors resulted in the displacement of both students and staff from their lives at the conservatory such as conscription and the damage done to people and property by air raids and the bombing of Genoa in which 2,000 civilians were killed and more than 120,000 Genoese citizens were left homeless by the end of 1943. However, the most damaging influence on the school during World War II was the Royal Italian Army in the early years of the war and later the German military; organizations which frequently requisitioned the use of the school's facilities by troops which resulted in significant damage to the school's property and premises in addition to interrupting the school's ability to continue providing consistent education to its remaining pupils.

In December 1942 the Wehrmacht of Nazi Germany ordered the placement of powerful anti-aircraft batteries and troops on the property of the Villa Raggio. This placed the conservatory's staff and students in danger, as it made their home a likely military target of the Allied Powers of World War II. As a result, the conservatory's leadership made the difficult decision to leave the Villa Raggio in January 1943 and took temporary residence within the Villa Saluzzo Serra art museum in the Genoese neighborhood of Nervi. The school was unable to take a significant portion of their resources with them due to the limited space offered to them at their new home; including the contents of its large music library. However, they did bring a full complement of handheld orchestral instruments, with the luthier Cesare Candi overseeing their careful packaging and transport. The school also transported four grand pianos, nine upright pianos, a harp, and, most complicatedly, two organs which were disassembled and then re-assembled at their new location.

In February 1943 the Nazi German military forces left the Villa Raggio, and the conservatory was able to return to that location. A few months later the Wehrmacht requisitioned the building again, and the school was forced to co-exist with Nazi personnel also using the premises. In a private letter from that period, director Pasquale Montani described the situation as intolerable, with the German command taking over almost the entire school, leaving very little space for music instruction to continue. Staff was forced to use storage closets and hallways as classrooms. One of the few remaining classrooms at the disposal of the school simultaneously served as the conservatory's administrative office for its director and secretary, the teaching space for all string instruments, and the teaching space for all music composition. Frequent appeals to the commanding officer Captain Nippert for more space were met with counter threats of taking away the few classrooms the school was allowed to use. In addition, Montani wrote several letters to the Italian government expressing the danger placed to the school and its students by the forced cohabitation, and also accounted the stealing of school property such as furniture by German soldiers who took items like chairs, tables, desks, wardrobes, coat racks, etc. The German military also made changes to the electrical system of the building which damaged the lighting system in parts of the building.

On 25 November 1944, a German military command truck crashed into the front gate and wall of the Villa Raggio which, unhinged the gate, displaced the left stone pillar of the gate, and left a large crack in the base of the gate. When the Allied Powers finally took Genoa in 1945, the Villa Raggio became a military center for the Allied Powers as well, which continued this disruptive period in the conservatory's ability to operate as a school of music. The school was able to restore stability after Allied forces evacuated the building on 30 June 1945.

== Post-war: 1946–1969 ==
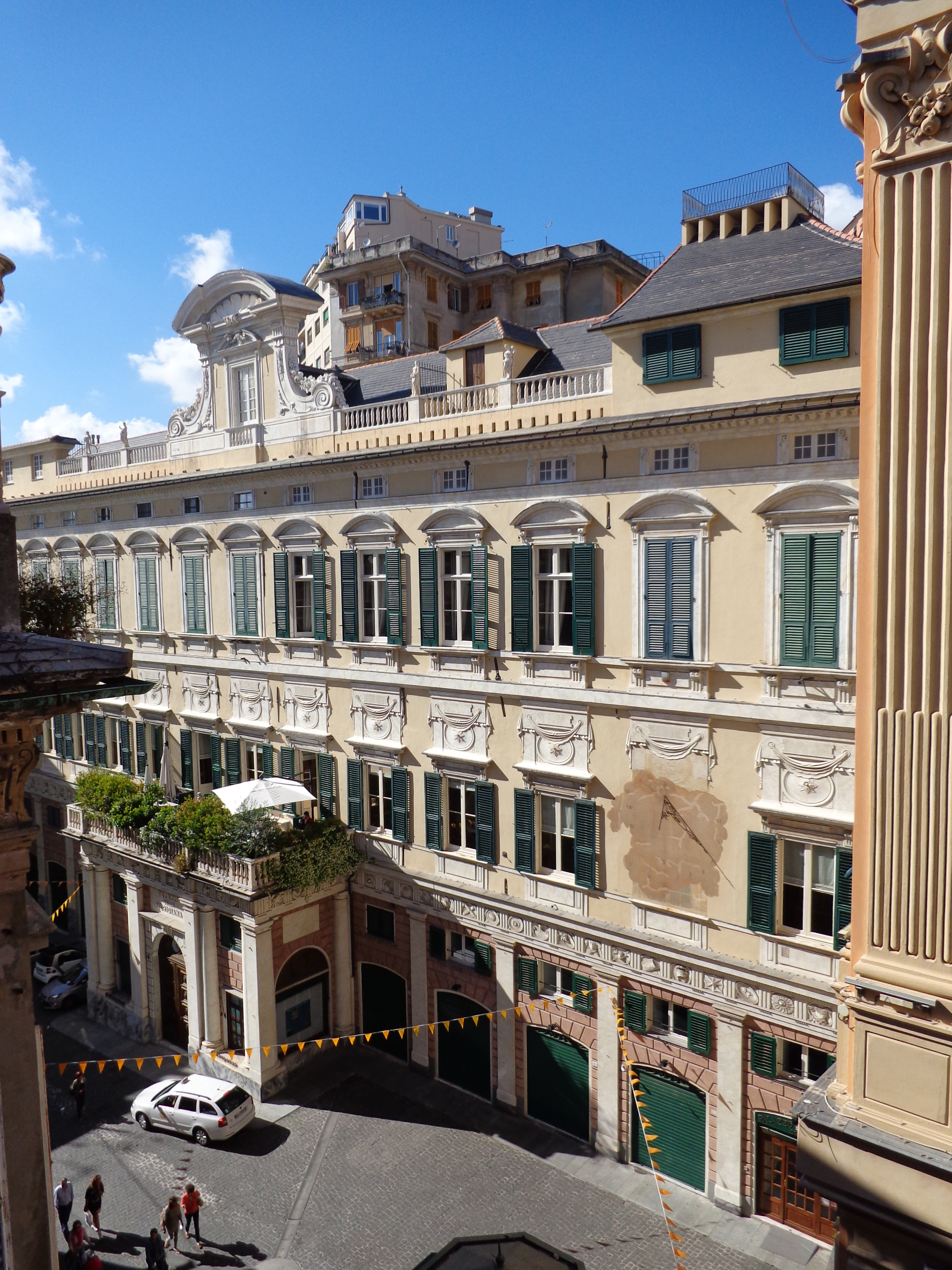
Facade of the Palazzo Meridiana Genova

Pasquale Montani's lengthy tenure as director of the conservatory continued in the post-war years in which he advocated strongly for repairs to the conservatory's home at the Villa Raggio. Portions of the school's roof had collapsed during the war, and letters written by Montani to the Ministry of Education in 1946 expressed his frustration at the lack of aid provided by the school's governing organization in the two years following the end of World War II. Montani continued to lead the conservatory until his retirement during the 1950–1951 academic year when he was succeeded by composer Luigi Cortese. Cortese remained in that post until his retirement in 1964.

Salvatore Pintacuda served as interim director of the conservatory from 1964 until composer Gino Contilli was appointed director in 1966. The conservatory purchased the Villa Sauli Bombrini Doria in Albaro in 1962 with the intent of moving into the premises. Repairs and necessary alterations to that building prevented the school from moving into that location for several years, and the inadequacies of the Villa Raggio required that the school temporarily relocate to the Palazzo Gerolamo Grimaldi (also known as the palazzo della Meridiana) during the 1960s.

== Villa Sauli Bombrini Doria: 1970–present ==
Since 1970 the Genoa Conservatory has been housed at the Villa Sauli Bombrini Doria in Albaro, Genoa. In 1977 Contilli was succeeded by conductor Gianni Ramous (b. 1930) as director of the conservatory. He was succeeded by composer Sergio Lauricella who was director from 1979 until January 1991. Canzio Bucciarelli briefly served as interim director until conductor Angelo Guaragna was appointed to the post in February 1991. Guaragna was succeeded by the school's first woman director, musicologist Patrizia Conti, who served as director from 2004 through 2011. After Conti, pianist Claudio Proietti was director of the conservatory from 2011 through 2014. Roberto Iovino was appointed director in 2014, and Roberto Tagliamacco became director in 2018.
