= San Filippo Neri, Genoa =

Church building in Genoa, Italy

Church of San Filippo Neri
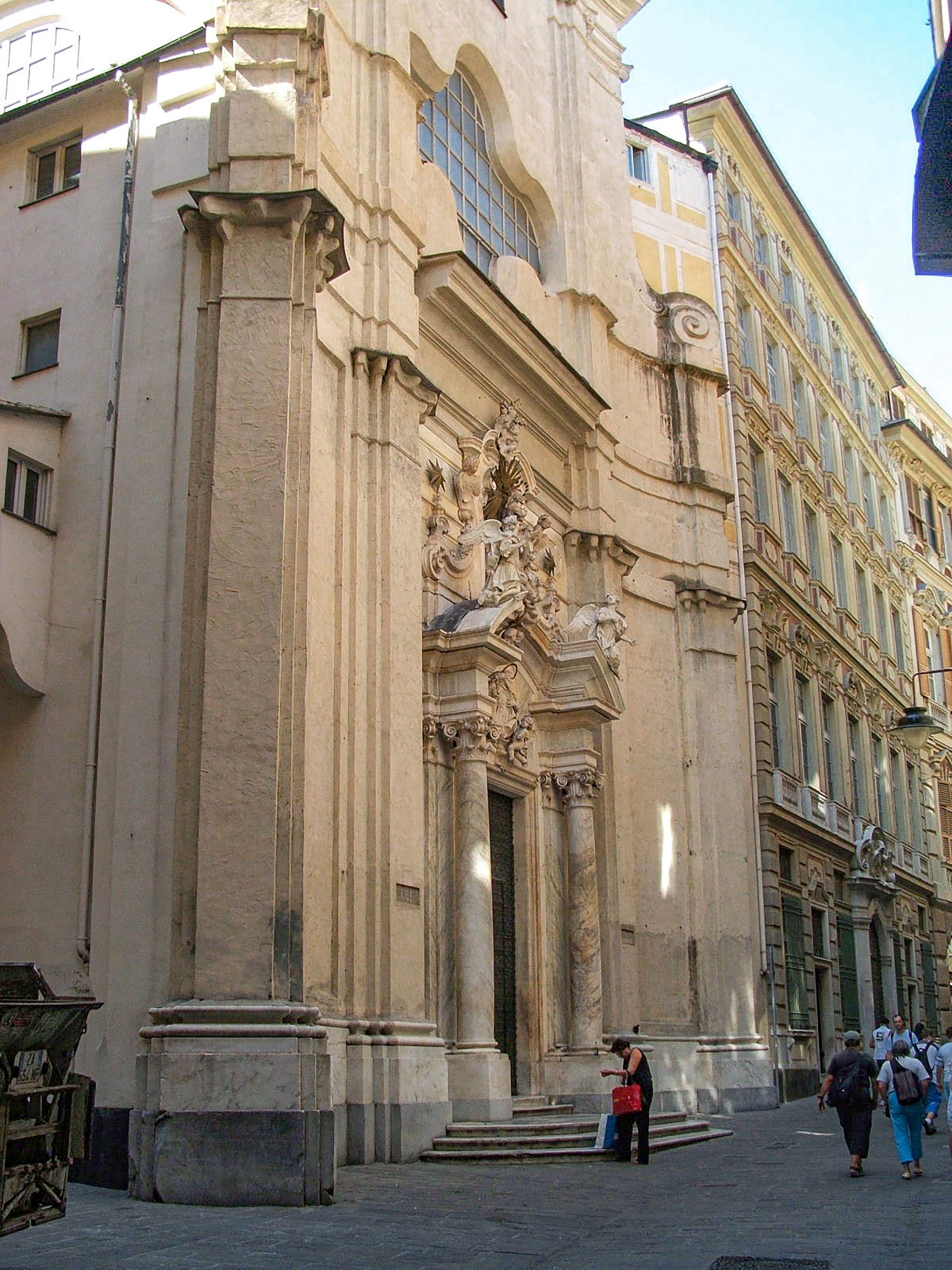
- Façade.

Religion
- Affiliation: Roman Catholic
- Province: Genoa

Location
- Location: Genoa, Italy
- Interactive map of Church of San Filippo Neri
- Coordinates: 44°24′46.7″N 8°55′45″E

Architecture
- Type: Church
- Style: Baroque Architecture

San Filippo Neri is a Baroque-style church on via Lomellini in central Genoa.

== History ==
The order of the Oratory of Saint Philip Neri had arrived in Genoa in 1643, under the sponsorship of the Oratorian and Marchese Camillo Pallavicini, born in Genoa. Originally housed in the church of San Pancrazio, the order moved to this new site by 1674, and built their church and chapter house on the site of a former palace of the Lomellino family. In 1834 the church became the residence of the Genoa Conservatory, and the building was used solely by that music school until it was reclaimed by an edict of the Holy See in 1928.

The nearby building on via Brignole De Ferrari houses the chapter house for the Oratory of Philip Neri. Designed by the architect Giovanni Battista Montaldo, it was built during the same period as the church. It is not clear who designed the church.

== Interior ==
The ornate interior decoration was begun in 1674. The quadratura and some of the gilded and stucco decoration were completed by 1706 by Antonio Maria Haffner, the brother of the Bolognese painter Enrico Haffner. The nave ceiling frescoes depict the Glory of St Philip Neri (1714) painted by Marcantonio Franceschini, who also painted the cornices with Miracles and Life of the Saint.

In the first chapel to the right are two statues of Mansuetude and Divine Love by Domenico Parodi, the son of Filippo Parodi. On the lateral walls are paintings by Giacomo Boni and Enrico Vaymer depicting Events in the life of St Francis of Sales.

In the second chapel to the right, are frescoes by Boni, and a Rest on the Flight to Egypt attributed to Franceschini.

In the first chapel on the left is a statue of an angel by Daniele Solari and a canvas depicting Pope Pius V verifies the stigmata of St Francis of Assisi by Domenico Piola. The wooden sculpture of the Pietà was carved by Anton Maria Maragliano.

In the second chapel on the left, a painting by Domenico Piola depicting the St Catherine’s Vision of Christ on the Cross as well as episodes of the life of St. Philip by Boni.

In the presbytery the billowing statuary group of St Philip in Heaven, designed and begun by Domenico Guidi, was completed with the help of his assistant Honoré Pelle. The pediment statues are attributed to Giacomo Antonio Ponsonelli, while the 1712 frescoes are attributed to Stefano Maria Legnani.

The oratory contains a statue of St Philip and of the Immaculate Conception by Pierre Puget. In also has frescoes by Giacomo Boni and a canvas depicting St Philip in Ecstasis by Simon Dubois.

The church organ was built by Giuseppe II Serassi in 1816. It was restored in 1995.

In 1834 the church became the residence of the Genoa Conservatory, and the building was used solely by that school until it was reclaimed by an edict of the Holy See in 1928. The nave of the San Filippo Neri was used as the school's concert hall during those years, and the adjacent rooms and structures were turned into classrooms.

== Sources ==
- Pareto, Lorenzo; Camillo Pallavicino; Massimiliano Spinola; Giovanni Cristoforo Gandolfi (1846). Descrizione di Genova e del Genovesato, Volumen III. Tipografia Ferrando. pp. 117–118.
