= Pietro Gaudenzi =

Italian painter (1880–1955)

Pietro Gaudenzi (January 18, 1880 – December 23, 1955) was an Italian painter.

== Biography ==
He was born in Genoa. His father, Enrico, was a musician from Bergamo. He had received early training from the painter Francesco Del Santo in La Spezia, but then studied at the Accademia Ligustica of Genoa, under Cesare Viazzi. He served in 1899 as an artist for the Genovese newspaper of Il Lavoro. But in 1903, he received a five-year stipend to study in Rome, where he worked in the studio of Francesco Carena. Among his most frequent subjects were maternal genre scenes. In 1910, his final essay piece at the end of his scholarship, a painting titled I Priori was awarded a gold medal at an exhibition in Milan. The painting is now at the Galleria Nazionale d'Arte Moderna in Rome.

In 1913, he was awarded another gold medal for the Torso of a Young Woman at an Exposition at Munich in Bavaria. In 1915, he won the Principe Umberto prize for a painting of The Deposition.

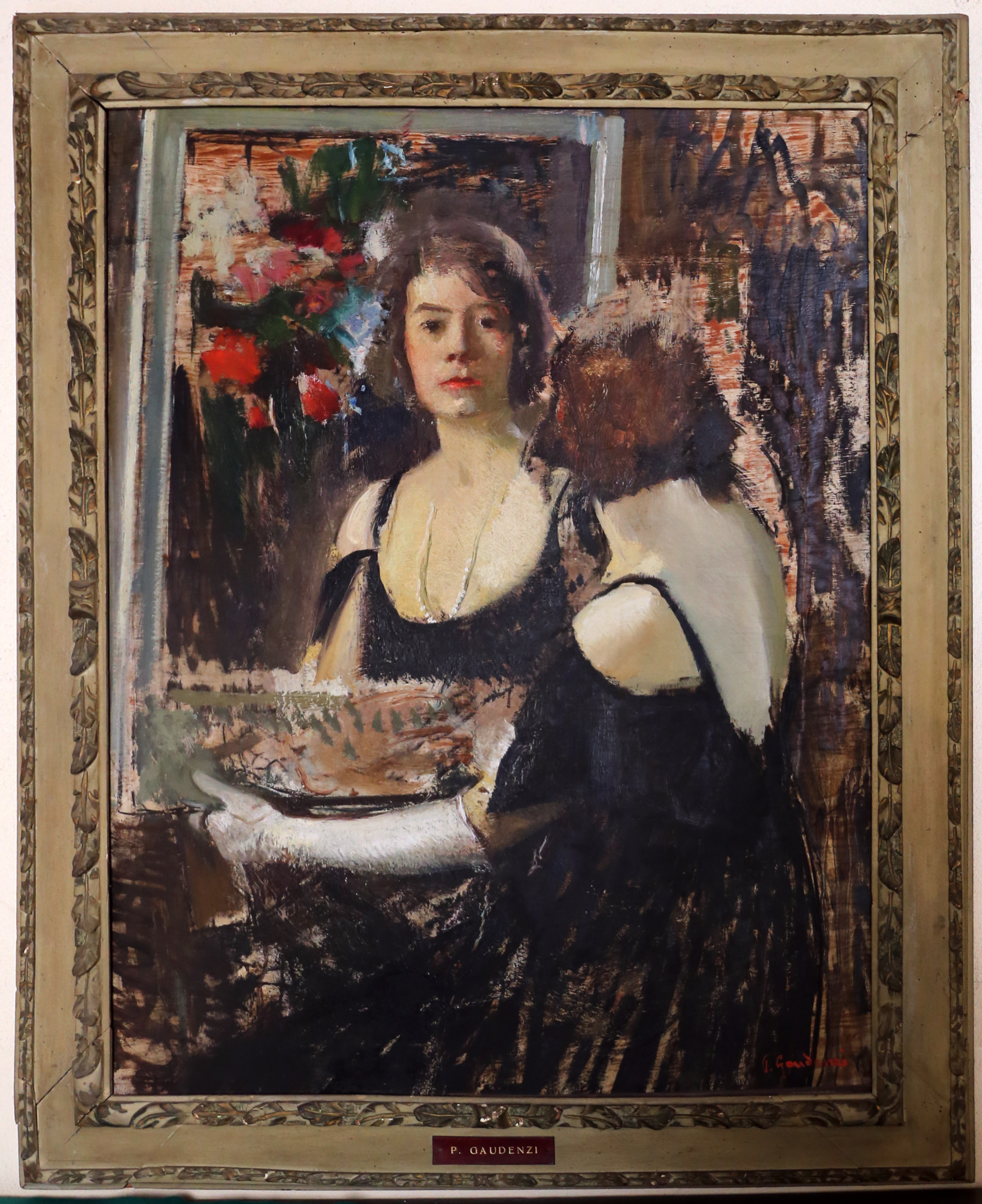
1910 Portrait of Countess Adelaide Odorico Castiglioni

He painted portraits of Signora Albanese (Gold medal in 1924, Monza), Wally Toscanini, Padre Giovanni Semeria, cleric Saule Radaelli, and Maresciallo Enrico Caviglia. He had been named professor emeritus for the Academies of Genoa and Parma. He became a professor of painting at the Brera Academy.

His painting after 1920s drifted into patriotic celebrations of work and duty, favored by the Fascist authorities. He gained many prestigious appointments in the 1930s, including a professorship at the Academy of Fine Arts of Naples, the Mussolini prize for arts (1936), and was nominated member of the Accademia dei Virtuosi al Pantheon, and to the Accademia di San Luca in Rome. He was president of the latter in 1937-38. In 1940, the Ministry of National Education awarded him a gold medal.

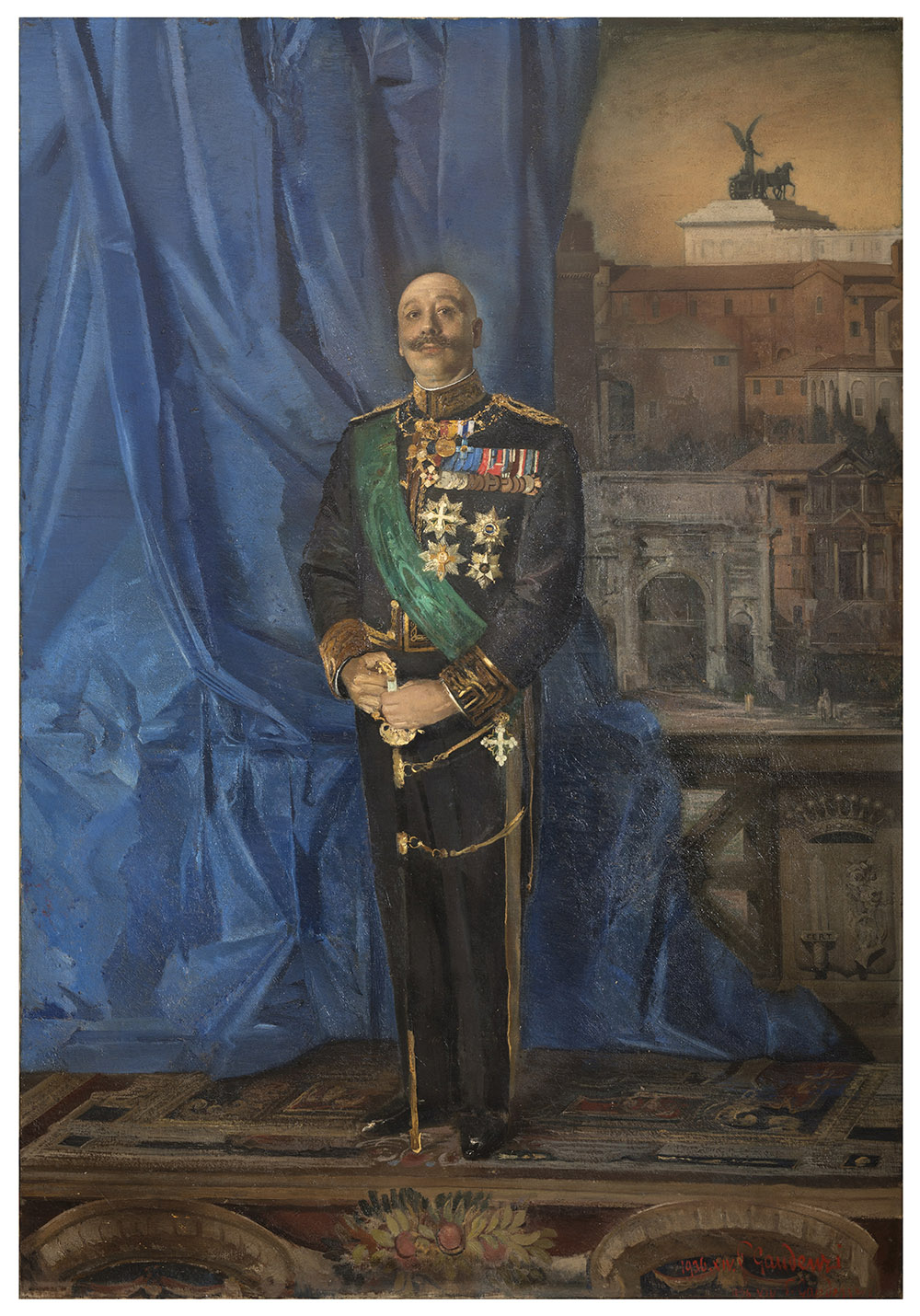
1936 Portrait of General Cesare Maria de Vecchi

After the War, he lost most of his official positions. He took a job directing the Vatican School of Mosaics in 1951. He participated in the mosaic decoration or restoration for the cathedral of Messina, the crypt in Ascoli Piceno, the apse of the church of the Regina Apostolorum and the church of the Collegio Americano of Rome. He completed frescoes for the castello and church of San Francesco in Rodi; of the church of Santa Vittoria in Anticoli Corrado, and in Castel Porziano (left incomplete). He died on December 23, 1955, in Anticoli Corrado.
