= Giovanni Enrico Vaymer =

Italian painter (1665–1738)

Giovanni Enrico Vaymer (March 17, 1665 – November 1738) was an Italian painter of the Baroque period.

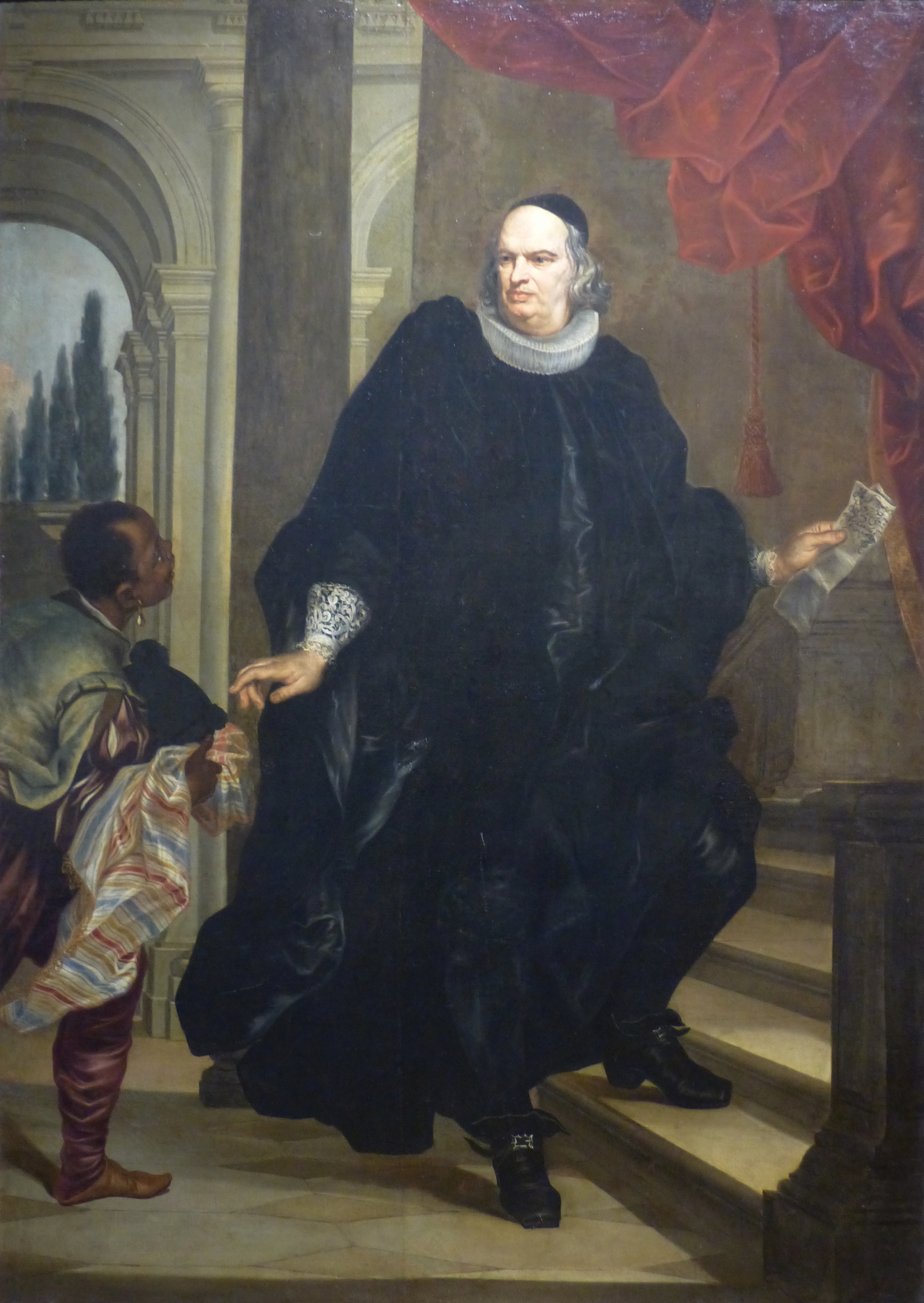
Paolo Gerolamo Franzone, Nîmes (Gard, France) Beaux-Arts museum

He was born in Genoa. His father, the painter Enrico Vaymer, was originally from Kiel in Holstein. His mother, Maddalena Ricci, was Genoese. In Genoa, he initially became a pupil of a mediocre painter called Schiena, but through connections with a local cardinal he was recommended to work with the Genoese Giovanni Battista Gaulli in Rome. There he met his lifelong friend, the painter Giovanni Marie delle Piane, known as il Mulinaretto. He returned to Genoa, where he became known as a portrait painter for the aristocracy, and was summoned to paint portraits the king and royal family at Turin. He was invited to remain at the court, but declined. He also painted some altarpieces in Genoa, including at the church of San Filippo Neri.
