= Giacomo Delcroix =

Italian painter (1894–1972)

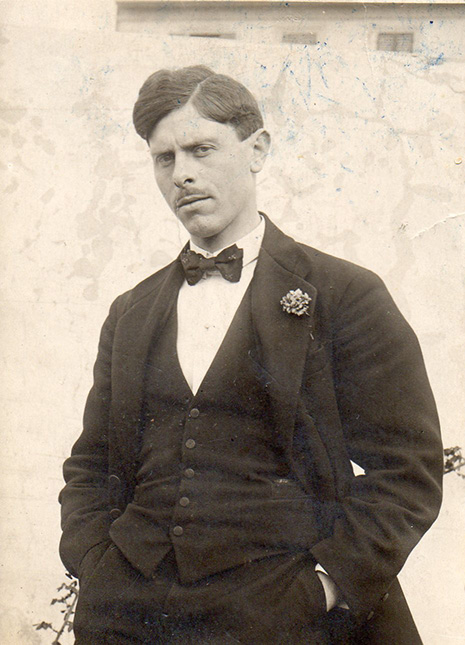
Giacomo Delcroix

Giacomo Delcroix (28 November 1894 – 1972) was an Italian landscape and still life painter.

== Biography ==
Giacomo Delcroix was born in Florence, Italy, on 28 November 1894 of Giuseppe Delcroix, contractor of Belgian origin, and Ida Corbi daughter of artisans. After living and having completed his first studies in Livorno, he returns to Florence with his parents and brother Carlo Delcroix, who will become a well-known military, politician, skilled orator, writer and President of the National Association for disabled people of war and Maggio Musicale Fiorentino. In the early ten years he studied at the Istituto statale d'arte di Firenze, together with, among others, Ottone Rosai, Francesco Chiappelli and Pietro Parigi. Among his masters we remember the painter Giacomo Lolli (1857–1915) and the painter and decorator Luigi Cavalieri (1869–1940), both from Bologna, and the ceramist Carlo Guerrini (1880–1930). His first known works date back to the early 1920s but it was only in the 30s and 40s that Delcroix reached full artistic maturity, exhibiting in famous locations and art galleries in Florence such as Palazzo Pitti with the National Association of Artist and the International Association of Lyceum Clubs and with well-known artists such as Alfredo Bonciani (1902–1988), Lucio Cargnel (1903–1998), Vinicio Berti (1921–1991) and Gregorio Sciltian (1900–1985) in the main Italian cities including Milan, Rome, Venice, Genoa, Padua. Gifted with great technique, he was also an excellent restorer. He died in Florence in 1972 and was buried in monumental Cimitero delle Porte Sante near San Miniato al Monte.

== Artwork ==
He was a well-known landscape painter, endowed with a particularly light and delicate touch; he achieves in his paintings, almost always linked to the Tuscan landscape, a naturalistic and vivid representation of reality of great breadth and spatiality with a sensitivity for the diffusion of light and for atmospheric elements. In the 1930s and 1940s he preferred painting on panels, titling his works on the reverse, without dating them except in rare cases, while in the 1950s and 1960s he started to painting on canvas. His works, of great classical impact, are present in many private collections and galleries of Modern Art in Italy and abroad. "Hills around Florence" can be seen at the Galleria d'Arte Moderna in Milan and "Going towards Verna" at the Gallery of modern art in Villa Saluzzo Serra in Genoa.

== Works ==
- "Fishermen", dated 1921, oil on card.
- "Winter", dated 1931, oil on panel.
- "Vase with flowers", dated 1932, oil on panel.
- "Still life with lemons and cherries", oil on panel.
- "View of Settignano", oil on panel.
- "Florentine hills", oil on panel.
- "Surroundings of Florence", oil on canvas.
- "Near Careggi", oil on canvas.
- "Italian Landscape", oil on canvas.
- "View of Florence", oil on canvas.
- "Road that leads to Fiesole", oil on canvas.
- "Along the Mugnone river", oil on panel.
- "Duomo of Florence from a hill", oil on panel.
- "Marina", oil on panel.
- "Farmhouses in Mugello", oil on board.
- "Surroundings of Pistoia", oil on board.
- "Paesaggio con torrente e case", oil on board.
