= Villa Saluzzo Serra =

Building

Coordinates: 44°22′56″N 9°2′44″E

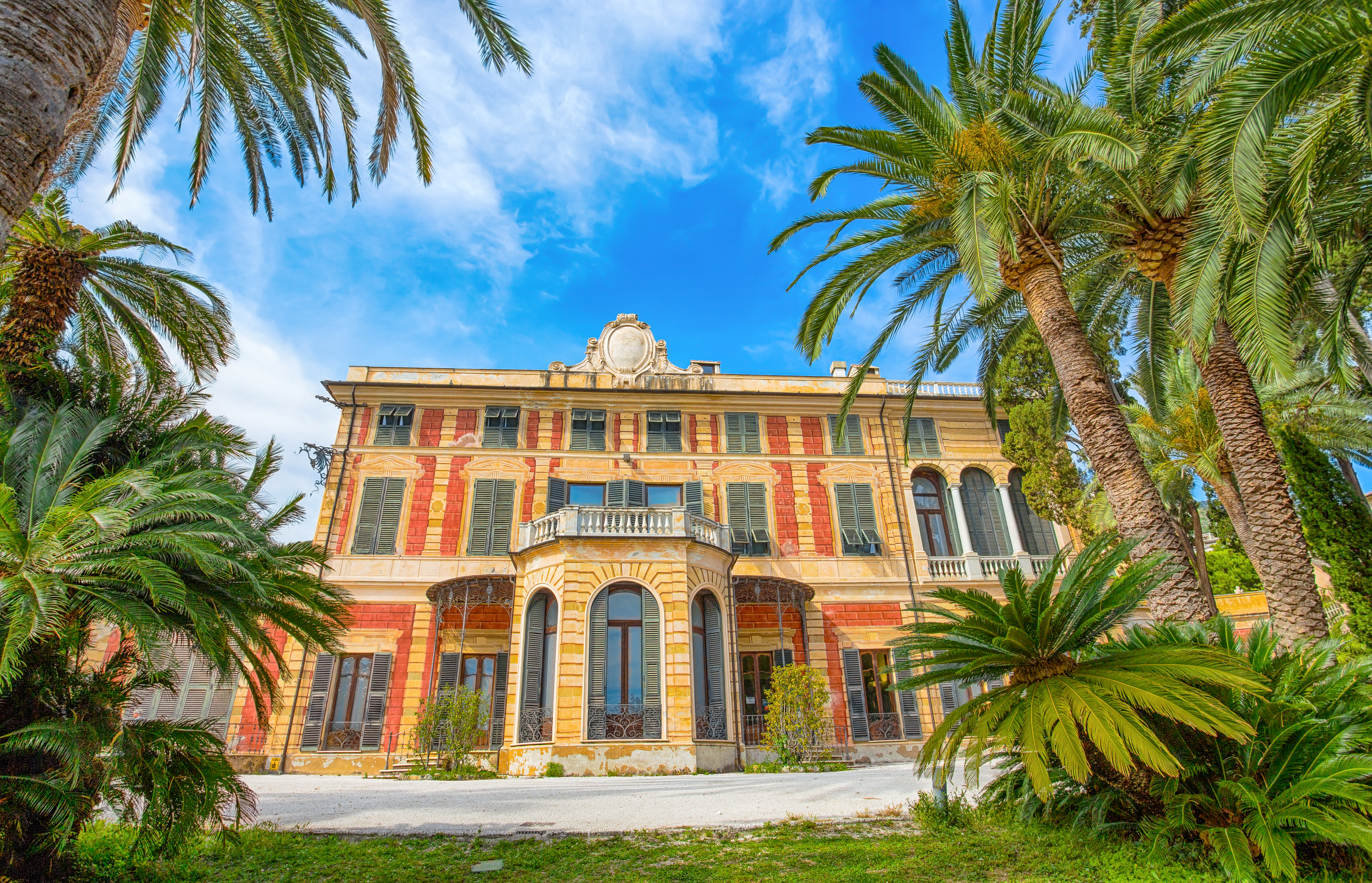
- Villa Saluzzo Serra
- Interactive map of the Villa Saluzzo Serra area

The Villa Saluzzo Serra is a civil building in the Nervi district, in via Capolungo, in the municipality of Genoa. Municipal property, and located in the parks of Nervi, it has been the seat of the Genoa's Gallery of Modern Art (GAM) since 1928.

== History ==
The construction of the building dates back to the 17th century and, over the centuries, belonged to the families of the Saluzzo marquises, then to the Morando, the Serra (1815) and finally the shipowner Carlo Barabino who sold it to the Municipality of Genoa in 1926 for the value of 2,200,000 lire. It was the Serra family (in the person of Gerolamo Serra) who mostly restructured the primary villa with expansions and modifications on several occasions, and transformed the original land of olive and citrus fruit into one of the most admired gardens of the Nervi park.

Among the illustrious personalities who visited or stayed in the villa are the daughter Luisa Maria Amalia of King Ferdinand IV of the Two Sicilies, Frederick William III of Prussia, Queen Maria Cristina of Spain and the French historian Jules Michelet. Near the villa there is a noble chapel.

== Garden ==
In 2018, the garden was part of Euroflora.

== Gallery of Modern Art (GAM) ==
The gallery, where extemporaneous themed exhibitions are also organized, houses more than two thousand and seven hundred sculptures, paintings, engravings and drawings. All the material, collected from 1850, can be dated between the beginning of the 19th century and the contemporary era. Initially constituted by the collection of works of art of Prince Oddone Eugenio Maria of Savoy. The gallery displays works by Nicolò Barabino, Ernesto Rayper, Tammar Luxoro, Giacomo Delcroix, Pompeo Mariani, Cesare Viazzi, Alfredo D’Andrade, Vincenzo Cabianca, Plinio Nomellini, Rubaldo Merello, Fortunato Depero, Felice Casorati, Filippo De Pisis, Francesco Messina, Eugenio Baroni, Arturo Martini, Renato Guttuso, Mario Mafai, Corrado Cagli.

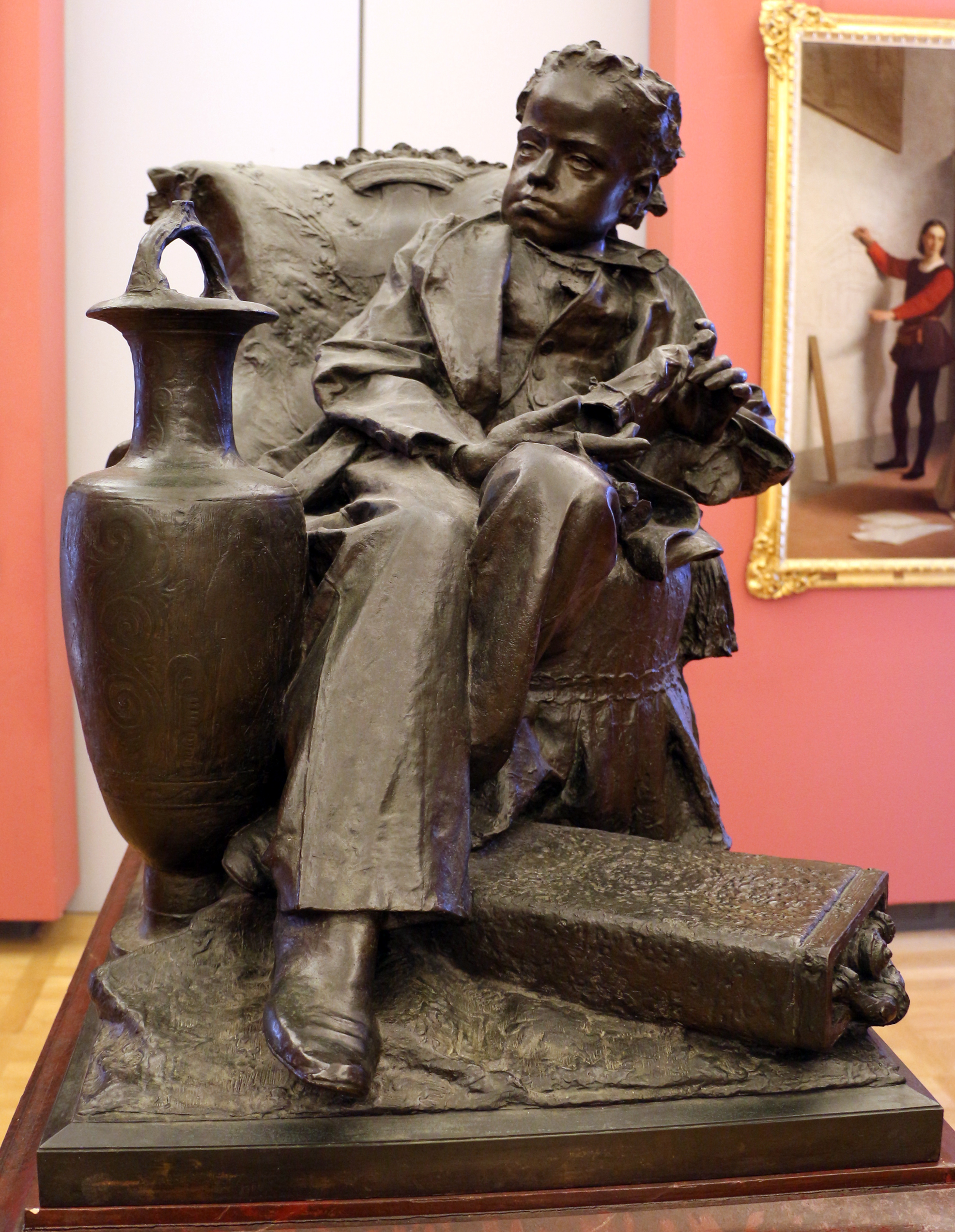
Antonio Orazio Quinzio, S.a.r. il principe Odone di Savoia, 1891

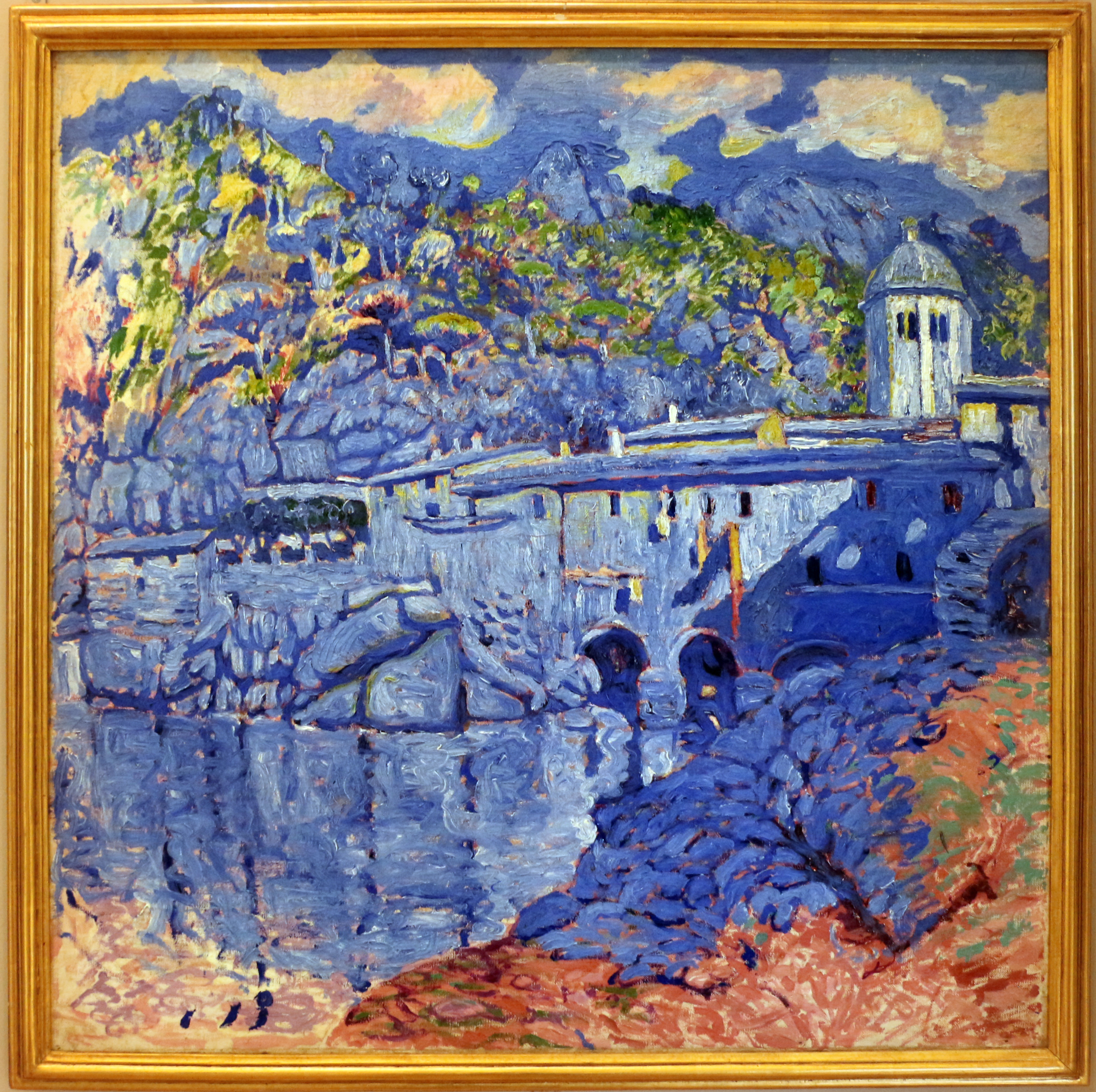
Rubaldo merello, Alba di primavera a San Fruttuoso, 1920-22 ca

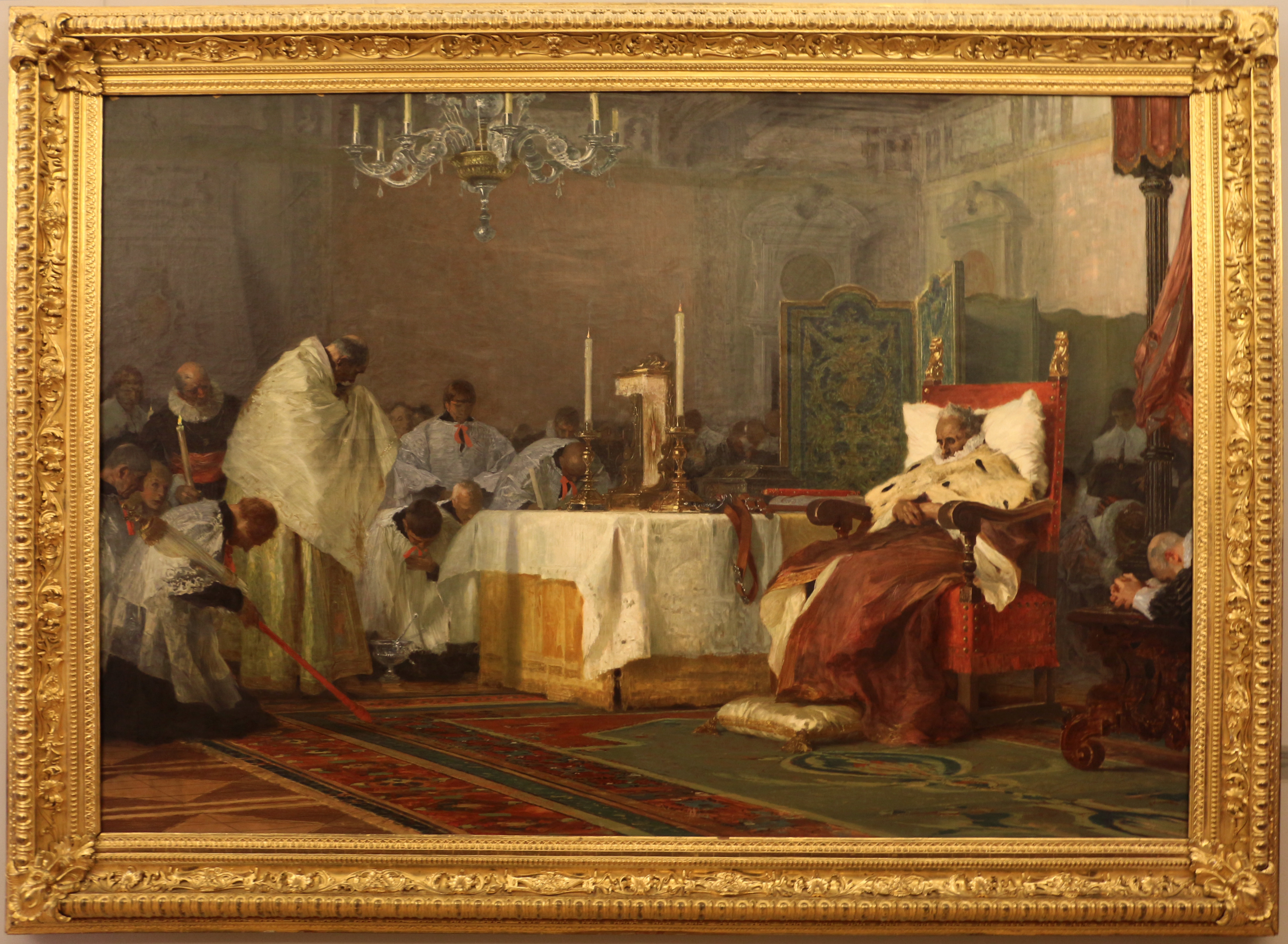
Nicolò Barabino, Morte di Carlo Emanuele I di Savoia, 1891

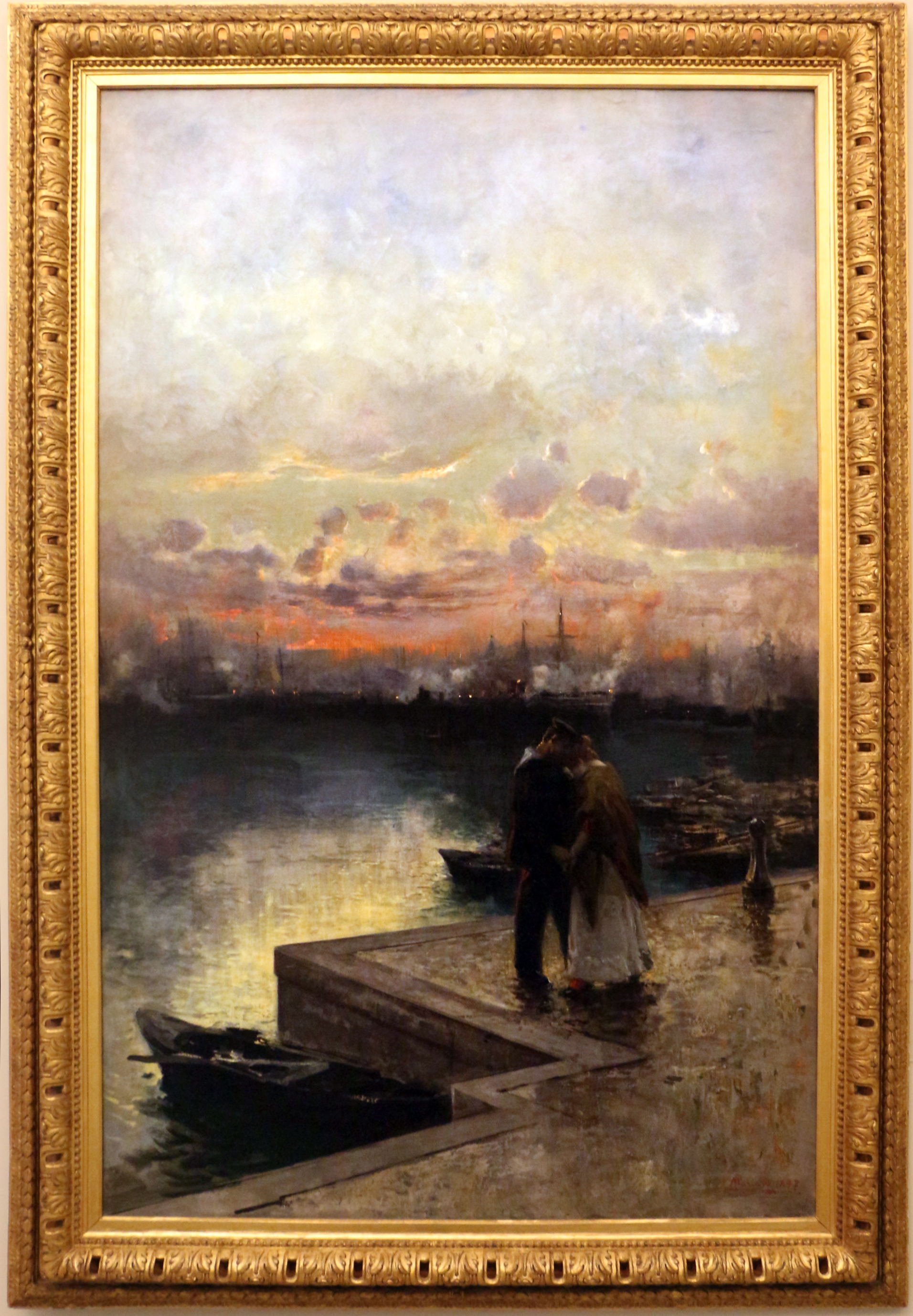
Pompeo Mariani, L'addio del marinaio

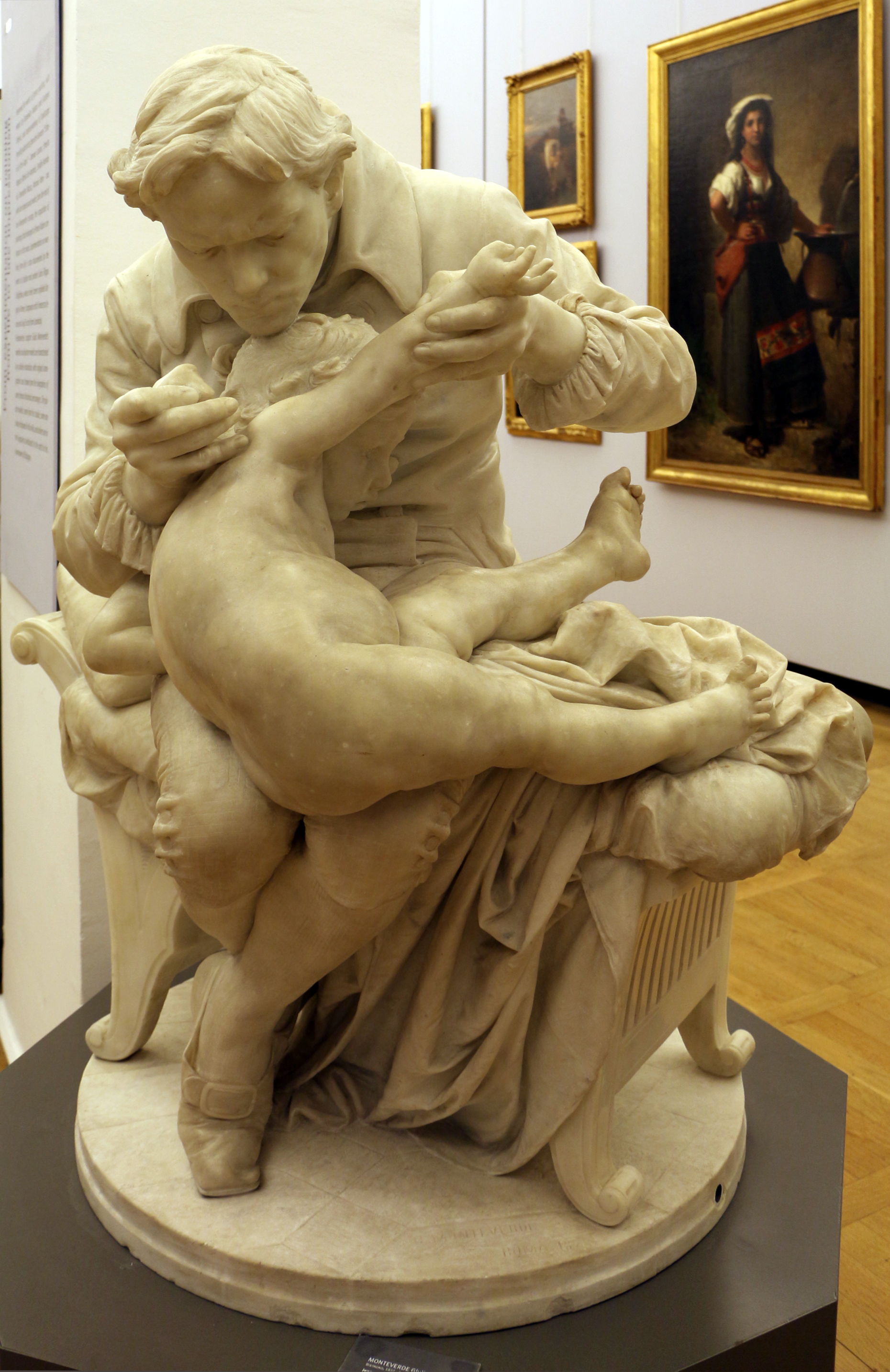
Giulio Monteverde, Jenner, 1878

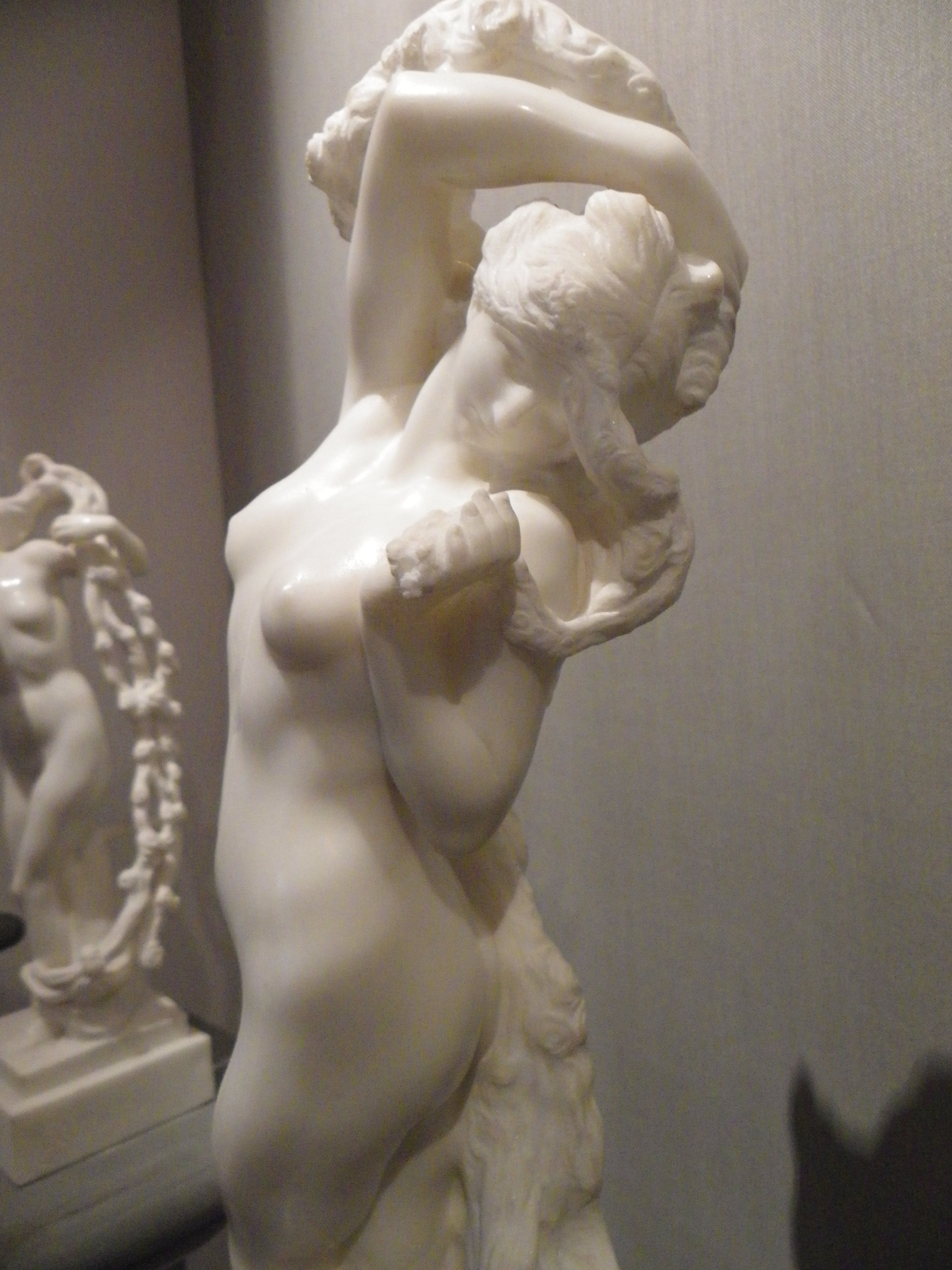
Leonardo Bistolfi (1859-1933), Ll profumo, marmo

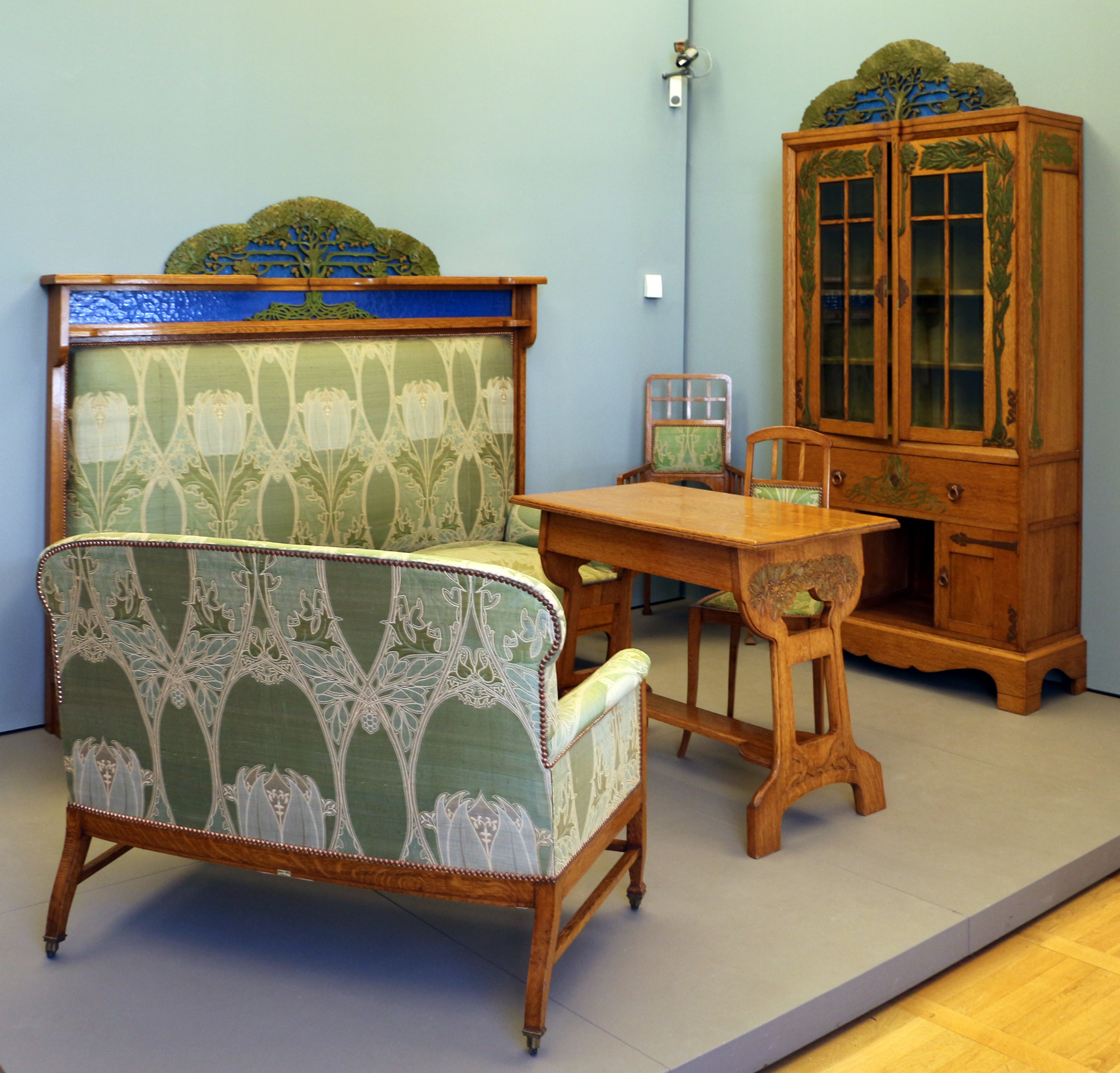
Alberto Issel, salotto, 1902 ca.

== See also ==
- Nervi
- Parks of Genoa
- Villa Grimaldi Fassio
- Genoa: Le Strade Nuove and the system of the Palazzi dei Rolli
- Euroflora
- Italian Riviera
