= Sant'Agostino, Genoa =

Historical church in Genoa, Italy

Coordinates: 44.405°N 8.93214°E

Church of Saint Augustine (Chiesa di Sant'Agostino)
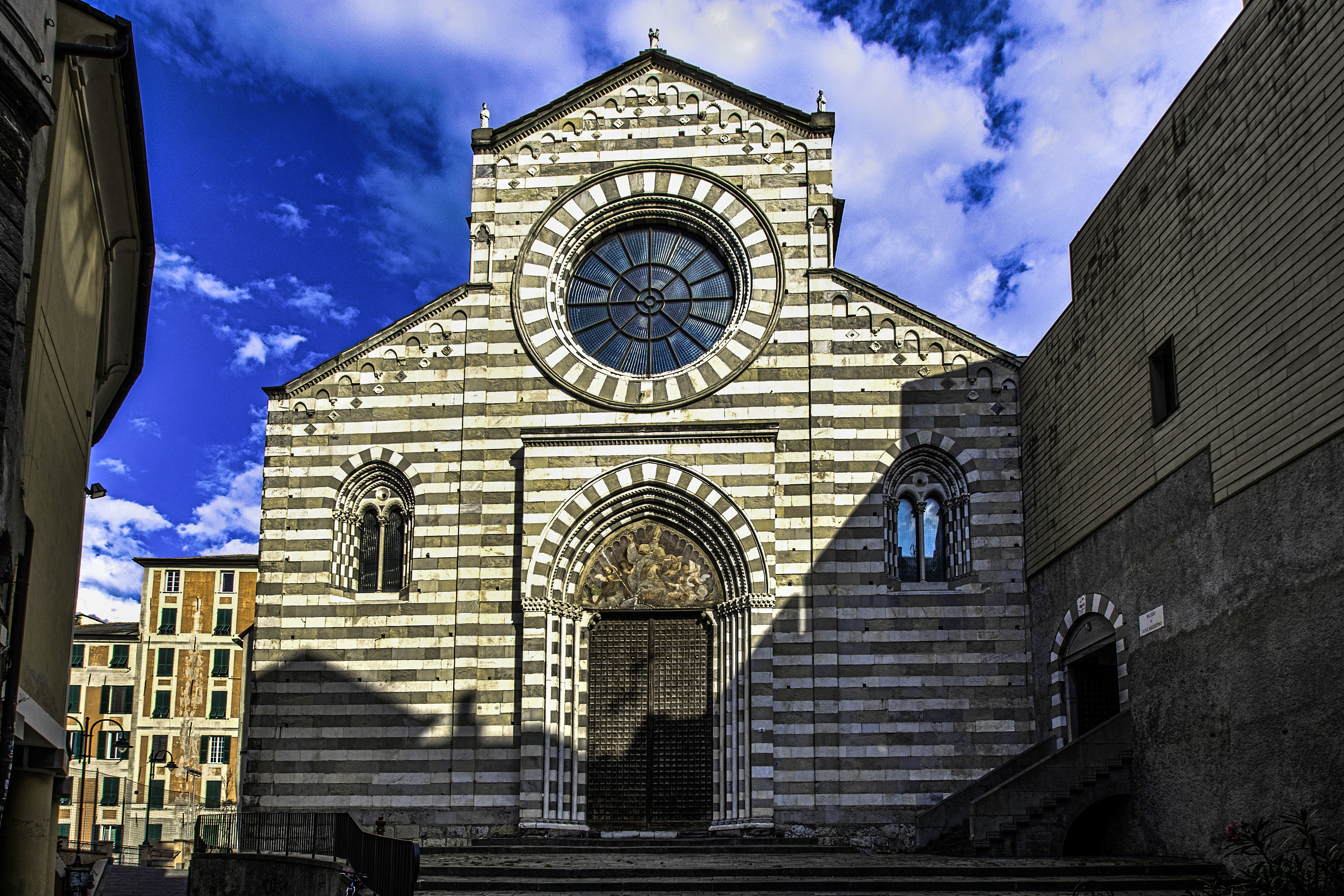
- Façade of the Basilica.

Religion
- Affiliation: Roman Catholic
- Province: Genoa
- Ecclesiastical or organisational status: National monument
- Year consecrated: 1260
- Status: Active

Location
- Location: Genoa, Italy
- Interactive map of Church of Saint Augustine (Chiesa di Sant'Agostino)

Architecture
- Type: Church
- Style: Gothic

Sant'Agostino is a church in the historical center of Genoa, northern Italy. It is today deconsecrated, sometimes used for representations of the nearby Teatro della Tosse theatre company.

== History ==
Begun by the Augustinians in 1260, it is one of the few Gothic buildings remaining in the city, after the numerous demolitions in the 19th century. It has a typical façade with bichrome stripes in white marble and blue stone, with a large rose window in the middle. Notable is the ogival portal with, in the lunette, a fresco depicting St Augustine by Giovanni Battista Merano. At the sides are two double mullioned windows.

The interior has a nave and two aisles divided by ogival arches supported by robust columns with cubic capitals. The church has also two cloister now included into a museum.

From 1928-1936 the building was the home of the Genoa Conservatory.
