= Aurelio Buso =

Italian painter

Aurelio Buso (active c. 1520) was an Italian painter from Crema. He studied under Polidoro da Caravaggio and Maturino da Firenze, and assisted them in several of their works at Rome. He decorated the palace of the noble family of Benzoni at Venice with friezes and other works in the style of Polidoro.

== Sources ==
- Bryan, Michael (1886). Robert Edmund Graves (ed.). Dictionary of Painters and Engravers, Biographical and Critical. Vol. I: A-K. London: George Bell and Sons. p. 204.
