= Cesare Viazzi =

Italian painter (1857-1943)

Cesare Viazzi (1857 – 1943) was an Italian painter.

== Biography ==
Born in Alessandria, he was initially a student of the sculptor and architect Angelo Cavanna in Novi Ligure. He then became a pupil of Andrea Gastaldi, first in Rome then at the Accademia Albertina in Turin. In 1893, he was named professor of the Accademia Ligustica di Belle Arti in Genoa. Among his pupils was Pietro Gaudenzi.

In Genoa, he was known for his portraits, but also completed large fresco or decorative cycles, including for the Società promotrice di Belle Arti, Palazzo Raggio in via Balbi, Castello Raggio a Cornigliano, Villa Weil, and the Villa Bisio in Albaro. He painted sacred subjects for chapels in the Monumental Cemetery of Staglieno.

At the 1883 Exposition of Rome, he exhibited a canvas of Il Beccaio. In the 1884 Turin, exhibition, he displayed: La vanità nei campi; Fiori di biancospino; La Scrivia; Il giorno di San Bovo; Ore calde. In 1887, in Venice: Un pescatore sul lago; Idillio; Mar. In 1888, in Bologna: Autunno mesto; Fede; Fiori. Among other works Il Canto del mattino and Ritorno dai campi

The contemporary critic Ercole Arturo Marescotti described his paintings at the Promotrice di Genoa:

The paintings of Viazzi portray the truth of the environment: what first impresses the observer: is the truth that most stubbornly look for in the abstruse, in the baroque, and almost despise them for failing to remain modest and simple: the truth of which you can overcome without studying the great and true mastery that is nature: ... Passionate lover of the truth, the atmosphere, but to arrive (there you have) sacrifice (the reality) for the effect, I would say almost to destroy the color found there, Viazzi well shows that what worries him most is not only vulgar effect ... and much less complacency before the intonation: his only care, his only study, is the tone, the totality of the painting. .. He cares very little to talk to the eye, but seeks, puts all his concerns, because his painting speaks to the heart.

He died in Predosa in 1943.
