= Tammar Luxoro =

Italian painter

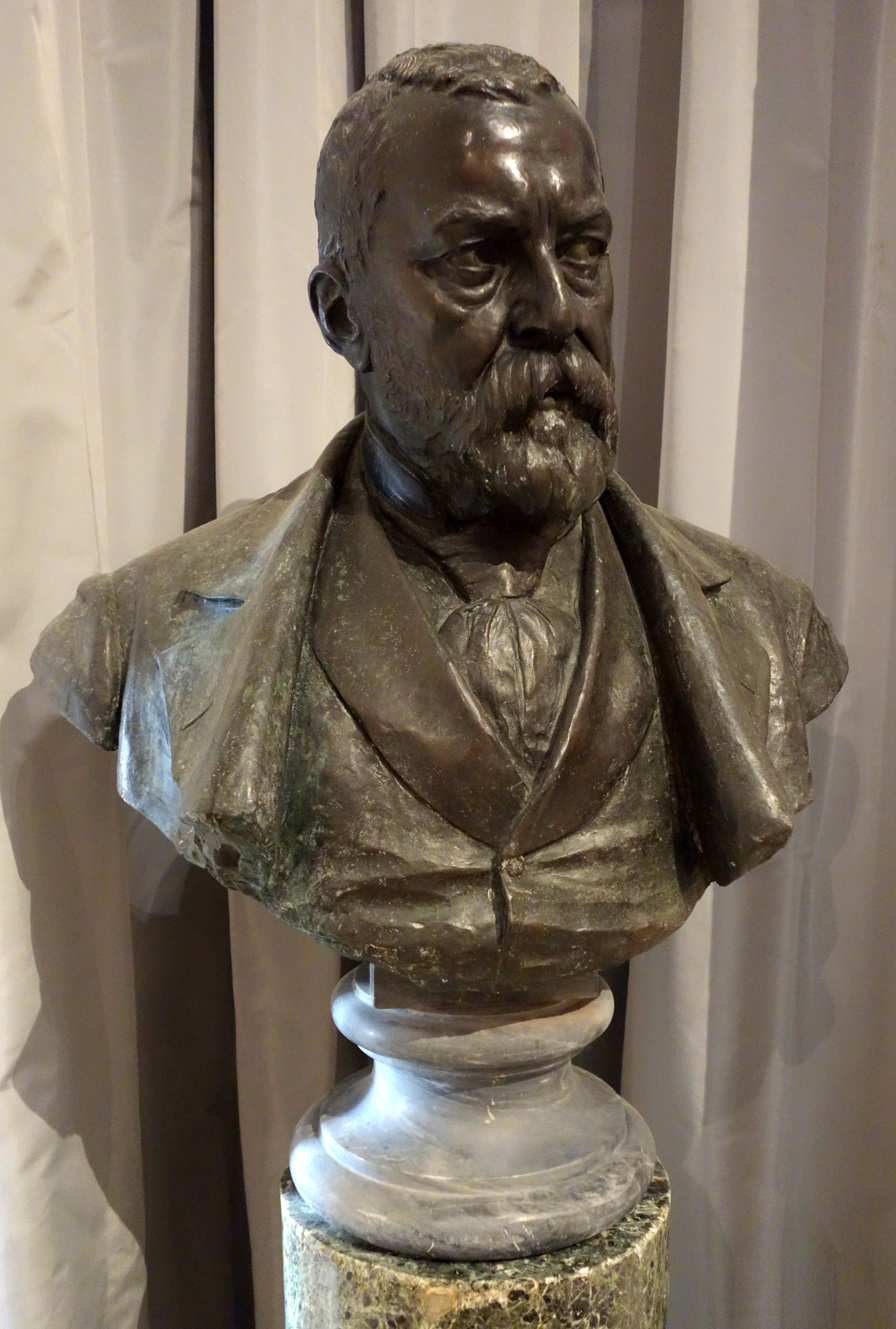
Bust of Tammar Luxoro by Augusto Rivalta

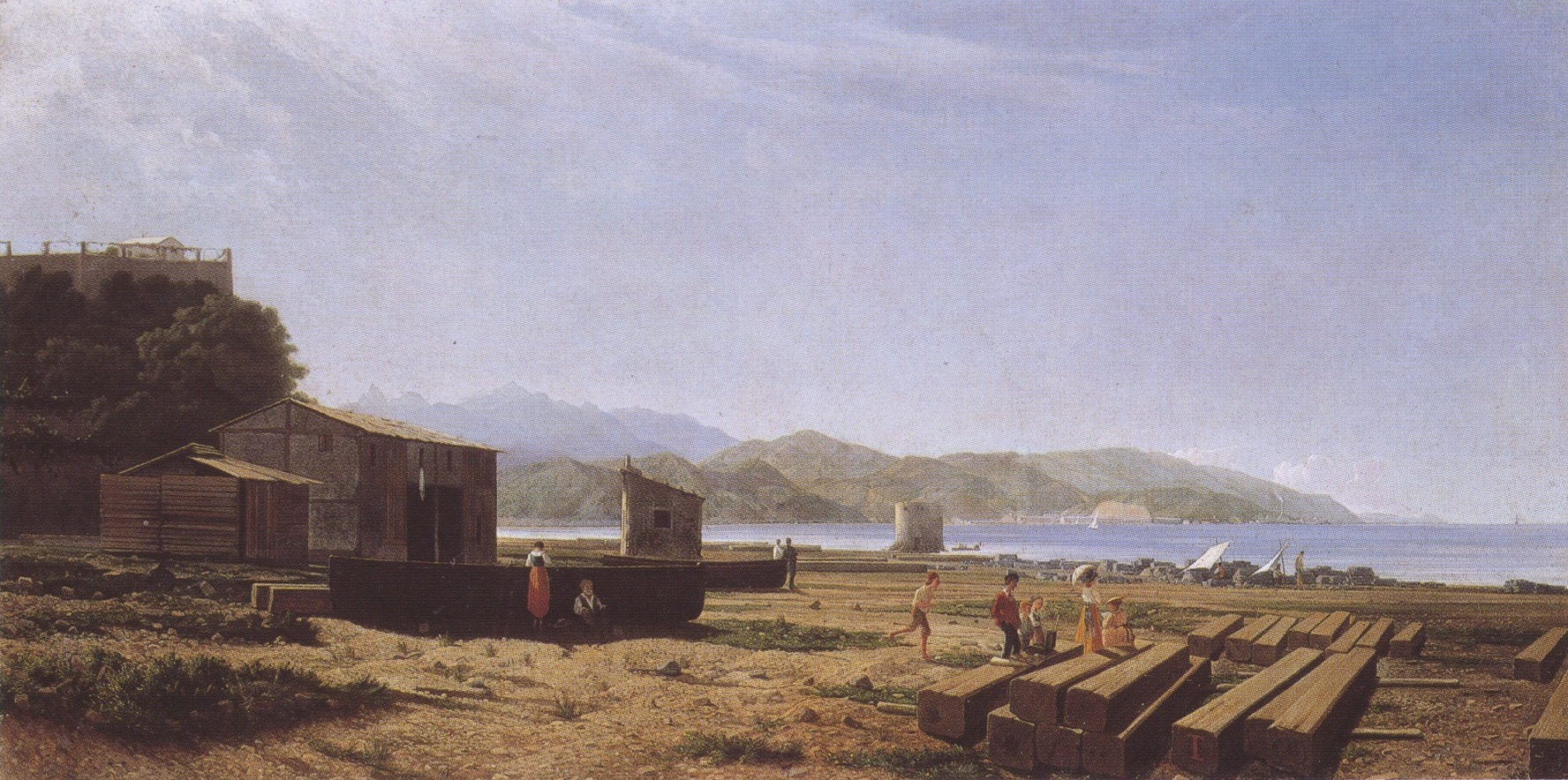
View of the Gulf of Spezia

Tammar Luxoro (February 11, 1825 – November 25, 1899) was an Italian painter, mainly painting landscapes on site.

== Biography ==
He was born in Genoa, Kingdom of Sardinia. He enrolled in the Accademia Ligustica of Fine Arts in 1842, and studied under the vedutista Domenico Pasquale Cambiaso. Among his influences were that of the Swiss Alexandre Calame, the Bellunese Ippolito Caffi, and later (1854–1857) in Luxoro's career, Antonio Fontanesi. Among Luxoro's colleagues in landscape painting were Ernesto Rayper, Alfredo d'Andrade, and the Spaniards Serafino D'Avendano and Alberto Issel. Together they began to frequent the studio of Carlo Pittara at Rivara Canavese, where a group of painters met and loosely constituted the so-called School of Rivara, consisting of mainly Ligurian and Piedmontese landscaper painters. One of his pupils was Aurelio Craffonara.

In 1849 he helped found the Società Promotrice di Belle Arti in his hometown. He became professor of his alma mater, teaching landscape painting, and was named to various commissions for the protection of monuments and architecture.

Among his works: Riviera di Genoa; L'asta del telegrafo; Il nuovo molo a Genoa, exhibited at Milan in 1881; Un paesaggio; Da Cornigliano Ligure, exhibited at Turin in 1884. His son Alfredo Luxoro was also a landscape painter. A collector of antique manuscripts and charts, Luxoro endowed the city of Genoa with the Tammar Luxoro Atlas, or Atlante Luxoro, a series of pre-Columbian, 15th-century navigation maps for Europe and North Africa.

Tammar Luxoro died in Genoa on November 25, 1899.
