= Rivara Castle =

Castle in Piedmont, Italy

- Castello di Rivara
- Rivara, Piedmont, Italy
- Rivara Castle in 2010

Site information
- Type: Castle

Location
- Location within Italy
- Coordinates: 45°20′09.51″N 7°37′30.81″E

Rivara Castle (Italian: Castello di Rivara) is a castle located in Camino, Piedmont, Italy.

== History ==
Late 19th century woodcut

The origins of the complex, comprising two neighbouring structures known as the Upper Castle and the Lower Castle, date back to the Middle Ages. The Upper Castle was built in the 12th century by the Counts of Valperga, while the Lower Castle was constructed in the 13th century by the Discalzi family, against a backdrop of rivalry between the two noble houses. At the beginning of the 14th century, following the extinction of the Discalzi family, both properties passed into the possession of the Valperga family. During the 15th century, the Upper Castle also served as a seat of inquisitorial activities, hosting trials against individuals accused of witchcraft.

Following the extinction of the Valperga dynasty at the end of the 18th century, the complex passed into royal ownership. In 1802, it was donated to the French general François Jourdan and, after the Restoration, returned to the Savoy state domain. Between 1832 and 1859, it housed cadets of the Royal Military Academy, and was subsequently used as a military hospital and a silk-spinning mill. In 1871, the complex was acquired by banker Carlo Ogliani, who commissioned the architect Alfredo d'Andrade to carry out its restoration. During the second half of the 19th century, the castle also became an important meeting place for artists and painters, associated with the emergence of the so-called Rivara School, a Piedmontese landscape painting movement whose members included, among others, Carlo Pittara and Ernesto Rayper. After a period of abandonment and deterioration during the second half of the 20th century, in 1985 the complex was reopened and used for contemporary art exhibitions.
