= Federigo Pastoris =

Italian painter

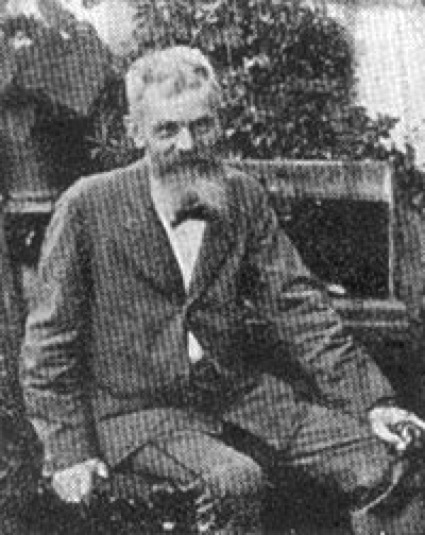
Federigo Pastoris (date unknown)

Federigo Pastoris or Count Federico Pastoris (1837 – 1884) was an Italian painter and engraver.

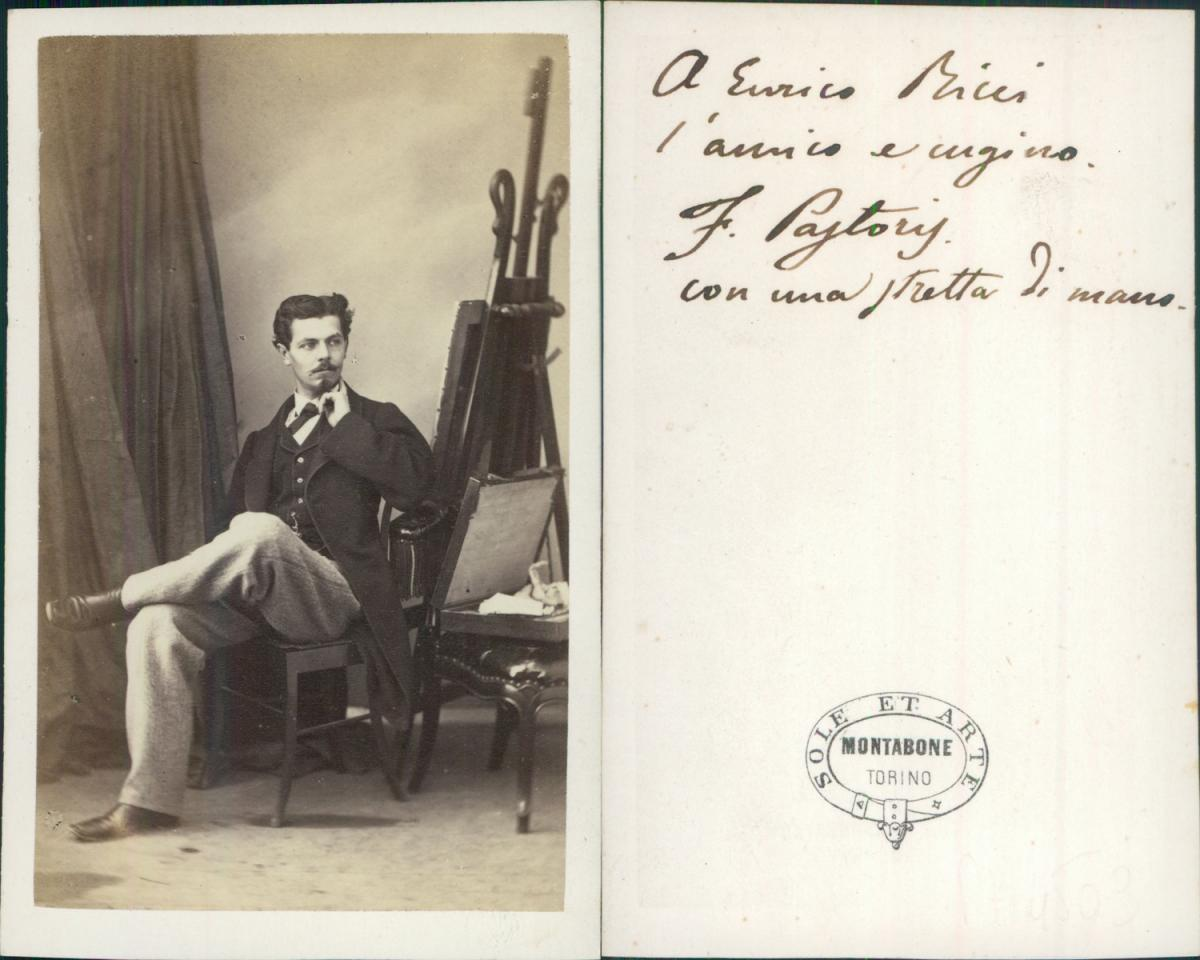
Carte de Visite

He studied and resided in Turin. He formed part of the Scuola di Rivara led by Carlo Pittara. This group of Piedmontese painters completed their landscapes on site in the open air (dal vero). The group included Ernesto Bertea, Alberto Issel, Vittorio Avondo, and Ernesto Rayper.

In 1870 at Parma, he exhibited: Incamminiamoci a figure painted al vero (realistically). He often painted figures in the native garb of the mountains of the Piedmont. He engraved a print titled Viadotto di Comba Oscura (Traforo delle Alpi) (Viaduct of Comba Oscura (Alps tunnel)) based on a painting of Carlo Lovera. The print was signed Federigo Pastoris di Casabrosso.
