= Giovanni Ottavio Rappetti =

Italian painter (1849–1931)

Giovanni Ottavio Rappetti (Turin, 1849 - 1931) was an Italian painter, mainly of genre subjects.

== Biography ==
As a young man, he was employed in documenting through drawings the collections – including beetles, flowers, and fossils – of the Museum of Natural History of Turin. He later studied at the Accademia Albertina under Gamba, Gastaldi and Gilli

At Milan, in 1883, he exhibited: Al convento; in 1884 at Turin, he exhibited another copy of the same painting: Una partita a tarocchi: In val Salici; Una bella giornata; Da Celle. practiced the then novel technique of chromolithography, including works such as La Famiglia di Carlo I; I facsimili Ciardi; and Lancerotto. He painted a Portrait of the Queen Margherita for the Princess Laetitia. Other genre works included Idillio; Vicinanze di Condove; Triste giornata; Fervet opus; and In cerca del Papa. He taught himself many languages, and taught German at the Circolo Filologico.
