= Aurelio Craffonara =

Italian painter and illustrator

Aurelio Craffonara (September 9, 1875 – February 5, 1945) was an Italian painter and illustrator.

== Biography ==
Born in Gallarate, he was the nephew of the painter Giuseppe Craffonara of Trento. He moved to Genoa as a boy of 10 years, and trained at the Accademia Ligustica of Fine Arts under Tammar Luxoro. He completed illustrations for posters and publications, including for a satirical periodical under the pseudonym Lelo. He collaborated with Giuseppe Sacheri, Plinio Nomellini, and Dario Bardinero in decorating the site of the Banco di Chiavari e della Riviera Ligure in via Garibaldi. Craffonara often painted watercolors. He died in Genoa.
