= Luxoro Atlas =

The Tammar Luxoro Atlas, or Atlante Luxoro, is an anonymous collection of Italian portolan charts from the early 15th century, currently held at the Biblioteca Civica Berio in Genoa, Italy. The author is unknown, although believed to have been made by Francesco de Cesanis of Venice.

== Background ==
The Luxoro Atlas is named after Tammar Luxoro, a 19th-century Genoese artist and collector, who once owned it. It was acquired by the city of Genoa in 1899, and is currently held at the Biblioteca Civica Berio in Genoa, Italy.

The Luxoro Atlas was once believed to originate from the early 14th century, and sometimes said to have been authored by the Genoese cartographer Pietro Vesconte. However, according to more recent scholars, the Luxoro Atlas was probably made by the Venetian cartographer Francesco de Cesanis, probably a little time before 1421.

== Features ==
The atlas is composed of eight sheets of nautical charts. With each sheet at 11 cm x 16 cm, making it the smallest portolan chart from the period still extant. It is believed to have been designed for on-board use. The style is very much that of the Italian school of portolan charts.

The eight sheets are separate nautical charts, together covering the "normal portolan" range.

1. north Atlantic (oriented with South on top, depicting southern England, French coasts, northern Spain)
2. west Mediterranean (oriented E on top, depicting southern Spain, Balearic islands and northwest Africa)
3. central-west Mediterranean (oriented N, depicting southern France, Corsica, Sardinia, Tunisia)
4. central-east Mediterranean (oriented N, with southern Italy, Sicily, western Greece and Tripolitana)
5. Adriatic Sea (oriented S)
6. Aegean Sea (oriented N)
7. East Mediterranean (oriented W, Nile delta, Levantine coast, southern Anatolia)
8. Black Sea (oriented E)

Unlike many earlier charts, the Luxoro Atlas makes no attempt to depict any Atlantic islands (not even the Canary Islands), ending the west African coast around Salé, Morocco.

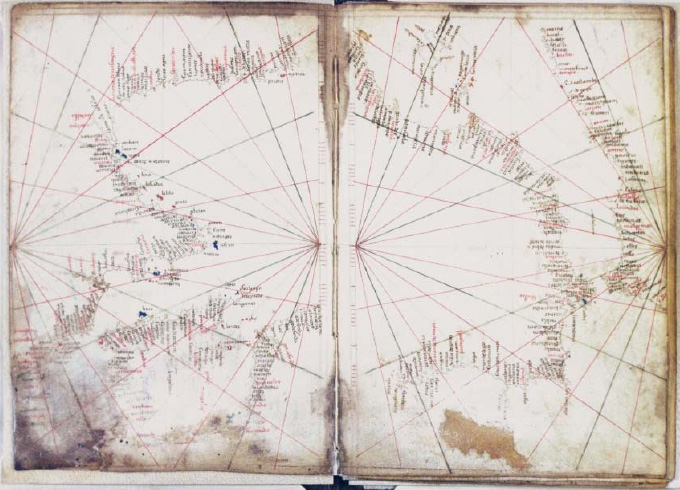
Luxuro Atlas, sheets 1 & 2 (north Atlantic & west Mediterranean)

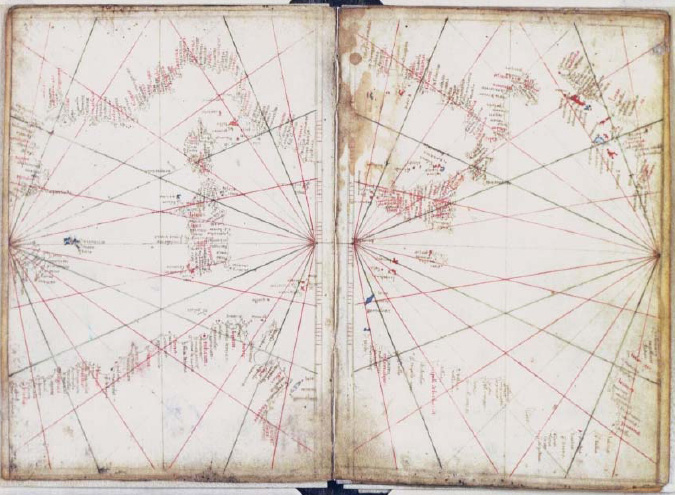
Luxuro Atlas, sheets 3 & 4 (Central Mediterranean)

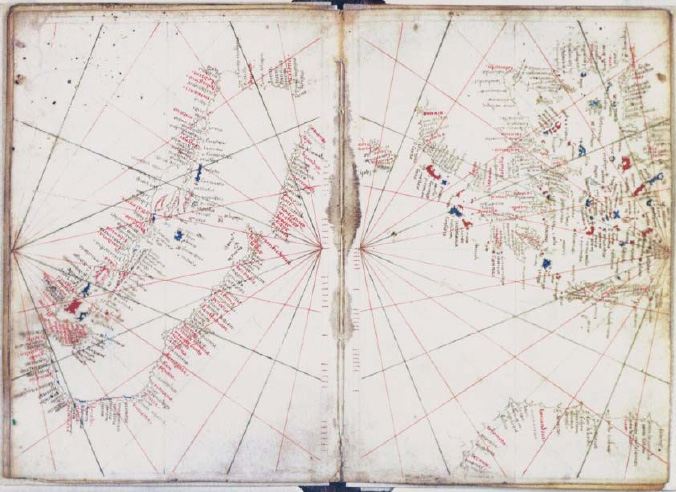
Luxoro Atlas, sheets 5 & 6 (Adriatic and Aegean Seas)

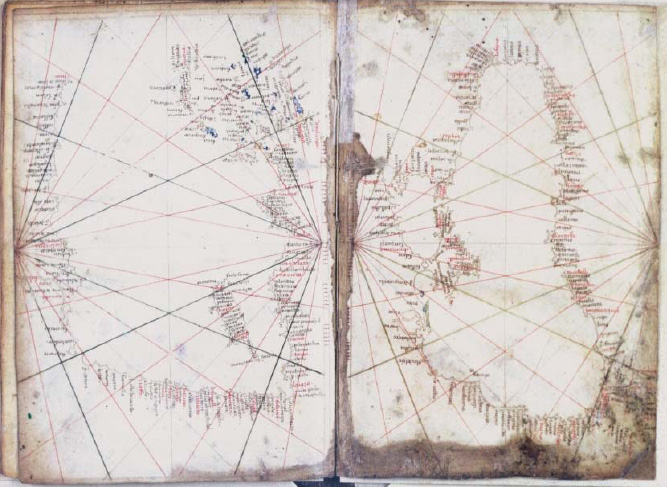
Luxoro Atlas, sheets 7 & 8 (East Mediterranean and Black Sea)

== Sources ==
- Online exhibit (zoomable chart): Portolano Atlante Luxoro at e-corpus
- Campbell, T. (2011) "Anonymous works and the question of their attribution to individual chartmakers or to their supposed workshops" (online, accessed July 7, 2011)
- Canale, M.G. (1866) Storia del commercio, dei viaggi, delle scoperte e carte nautiche degl'italiani Genoa: Tip. Sociale. online
