= Carlo Pittara =

Italian painter (1835–1891)

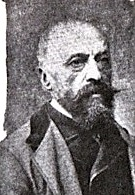
Carlo Pittara (date unknown)

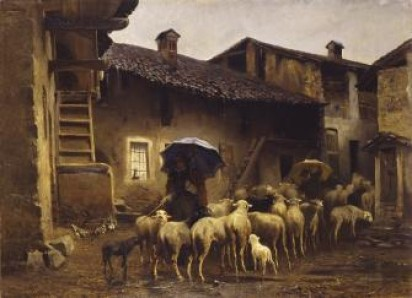
Return to the Fold (c.1865)

Carlo Pittara (6 June 1835 – 25 October 1891) was an Italian painter who specialized in animals, pastoral landscapes, rivers and peasants at work. He was also the leader of what came to be known as the Scuola di Rivara.

== Biography ==
He was born in Turin. He began his studies at the Accademia Albertina, where he worked with the landscape painter Giuseppe Camino. In 1856, he moved to Geneva and studied with Charles Humbert (1813–1881), who specialized in animal paintings.

From 1858 to 1860, he lived in Paris, where he became familiar with the works of Camille Corot and Charles Jacque. He also came under the influence of the Barbizon school. After that, he spent three years in Rome. Later, he became the leader of a group of landscape painters who met during the summers near Rivara, in the Canavese, to paint "en plein aire". This group consisted of artists who worked in both the Romantic and Realistic styles, including Ernesto Bertea, Alberto Issel, Serafín Avendaño, Ernesto Rayper and Federigo Pastoris: referred to as the "Scuola di Rivara". Some were also members of a group known as the "Scuola grigia", centered in Liguria.

During the last ten years of his life, he spent the winters in Paris, where his work began to take on Impressionist overtones. He died in Rivara in 1891. After his death, Telemaco Signorini questioned his role in establishing the Scuola di Rivara, suggesting that Rayper was actually the focus of the group's inspiration. Pittara was, in fact, largely forgotten until 1947, when the "Galleria Fogliato" in Turin presented 88 of his canvases.
