= Issel =

Issel is an Italian surname, and the name of a town in France. It can refer to:

== Places ==
- Oude IJssel, river in Germany and the Netherlands
- Issel, Aude, France

== People ==
- Saint Issel, 6th-century Welsh saint
- Alberto Issel (1848–1926), Italian painter
- Arturo Issel (1842–1922), Italian geologist and malacologist
- Dan Issel (born 1948), American basketball player
- Kim Issel (born 1967), Canadian ice hockey right winger
- Germán Issel (born 1986), Argentinian entrepreneur
