= Antique Furniture & Wooden Sculpture Museum =

Coordinates: 45°28′15″N 9°10′45″E

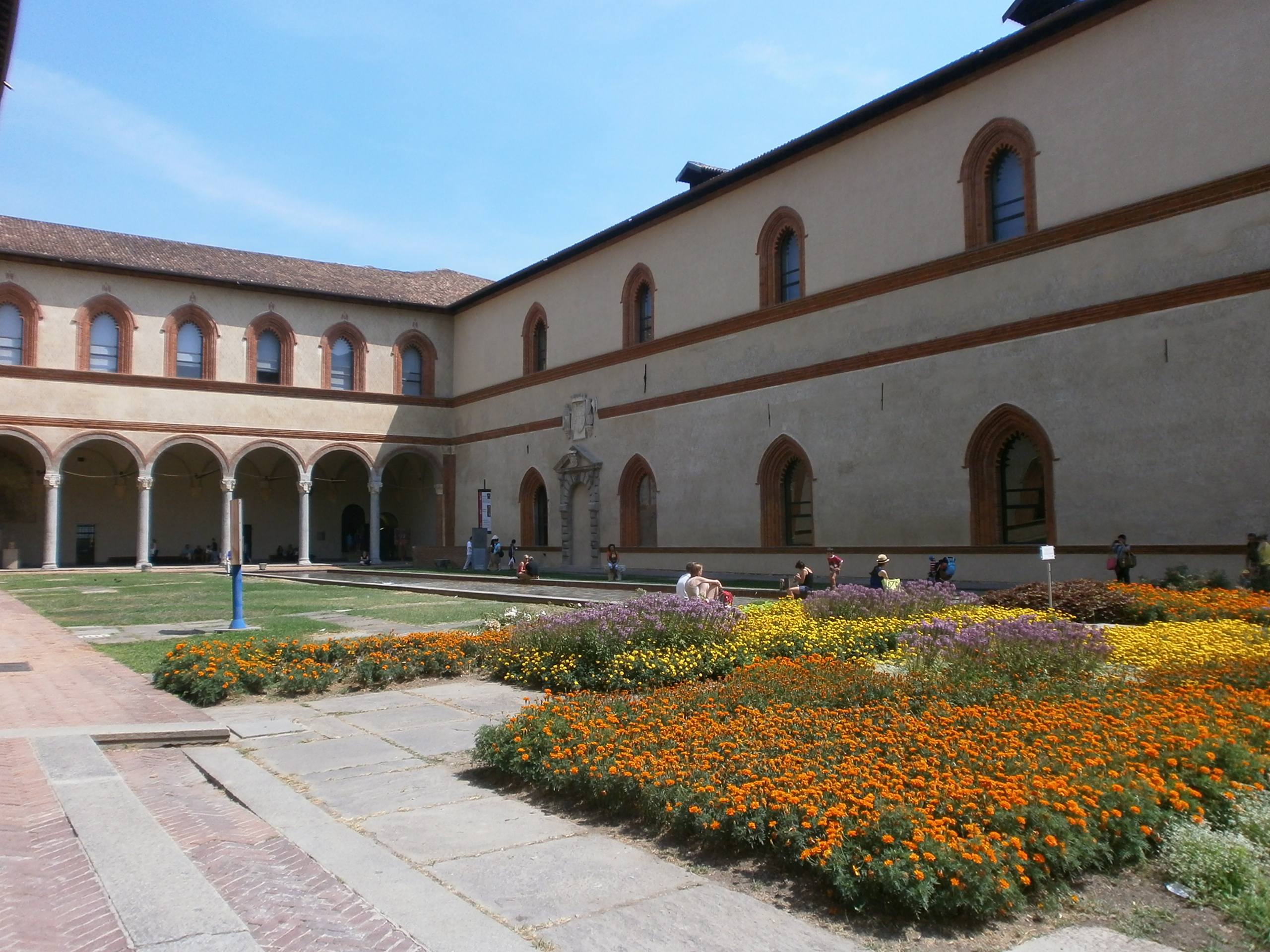
- An inner view of Sforza Castle.
- Location: Piazza Castello 3, 20121, Milan, Italy
- Director: Francesca Tasso
- Website: www.milanocastello.it/ing/home.html

The Antique Furnishings & Wooden Sculpture Museum of Milan is located on the first floor of the Sforza Castle ducal courtyard and it is part of the Sforza Castle's Civic Museum complex.

== History ==
The museum was formed in 1908, thanks to the purchase of a large furniture collection from the Mora family, along with a number of other donations. During the 20th century the collection grew thanks to donations from a number of other families, and the addition of furniture from Savoy Residences.

== Collections ==
The itinerary is chronologically arranged from the 14th century to the modern times with a particular attention for the Italian and lombardic furniture history. One of the most important artifacts exposed in the museum is the Chamber of Griselda: a wooden room reconstructed with fifteenth century detached frescoes to create a scale replica of how it looked in its original location in the Roccabianca Castle near Parma.

The Italian 20th century furniture and the italian design are well represented by furniture signed Alberto Issel, Carlo Bugatti and Ettore Sottsass, while the 18th-century Italian school of cabinetmakers are well represented by several cabinets signed Giuseppe Maggiolini. Are also exposed religious furnishing from 16th–18th century and furniture of the noble families of Milan.

Several wooden sculptures and various decorative items, such pottery or tableware including a tea set designed by Gio Ponti, are also displayed in the museum.

== See also ==
- Antique furniture
- Sforza Castle

== Gallery ==
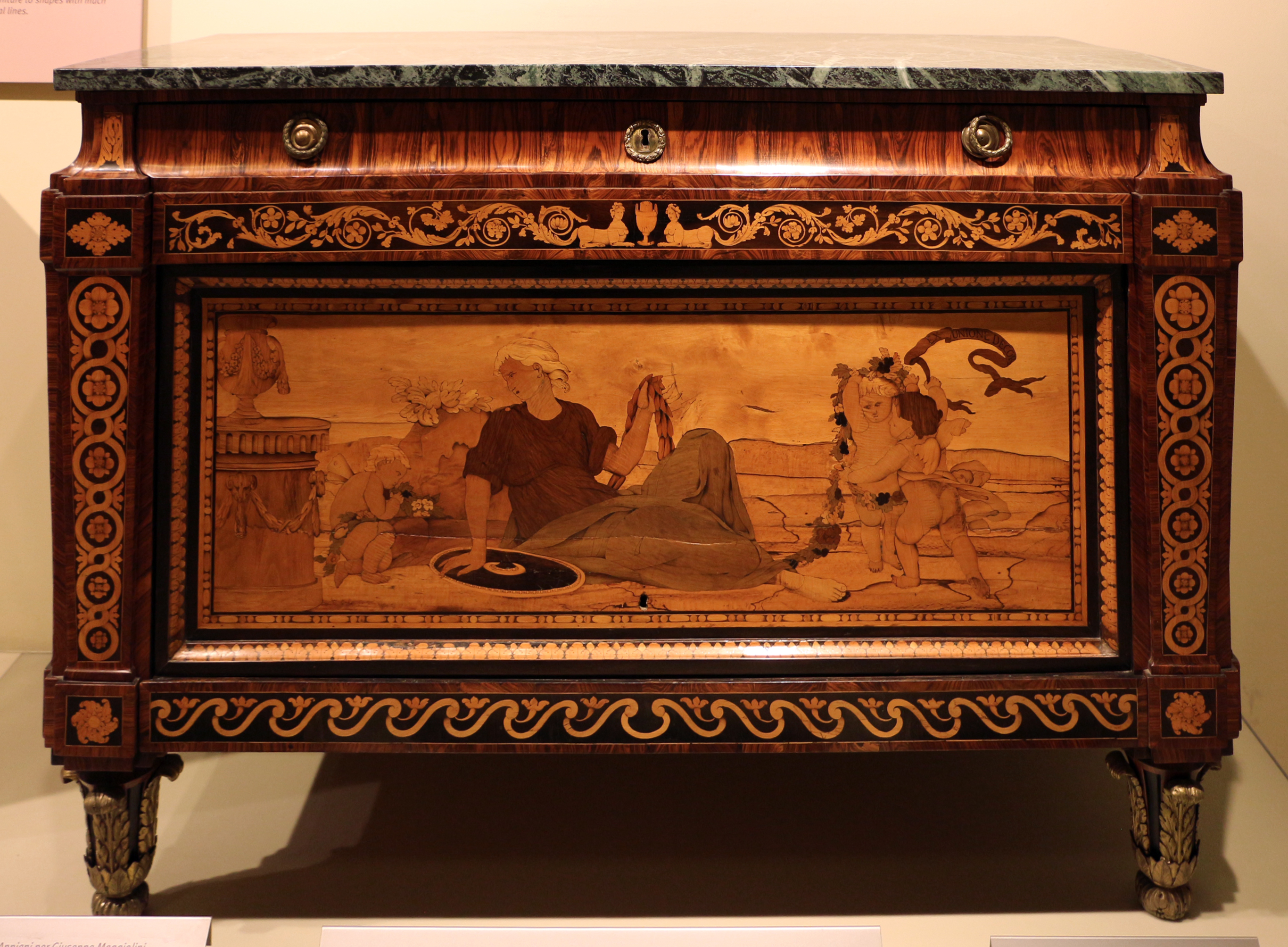
Chest of drawers, Giuseppe Maggiolini, 1780−85.

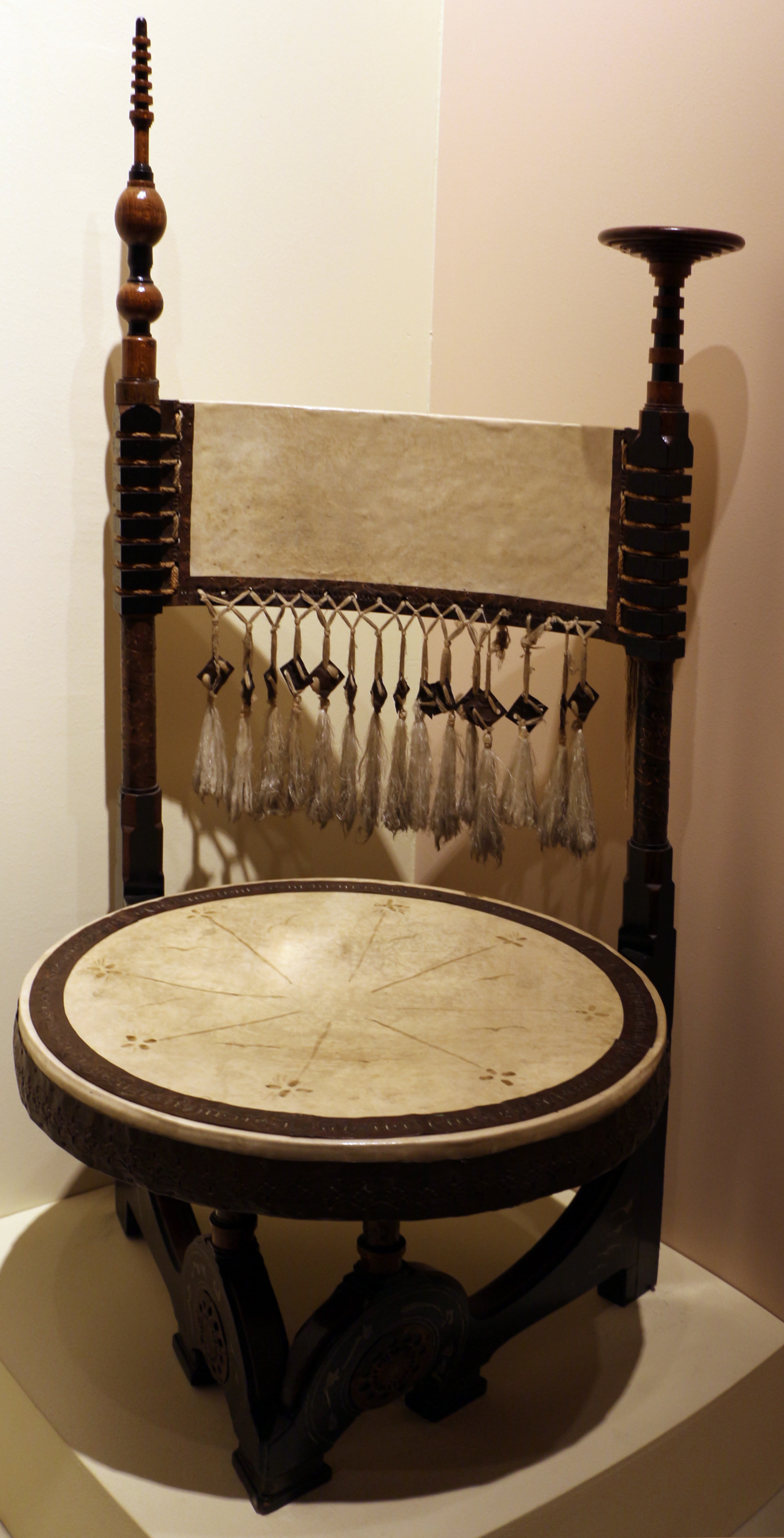
Circular chair, Carlo Bugatti, 1902.

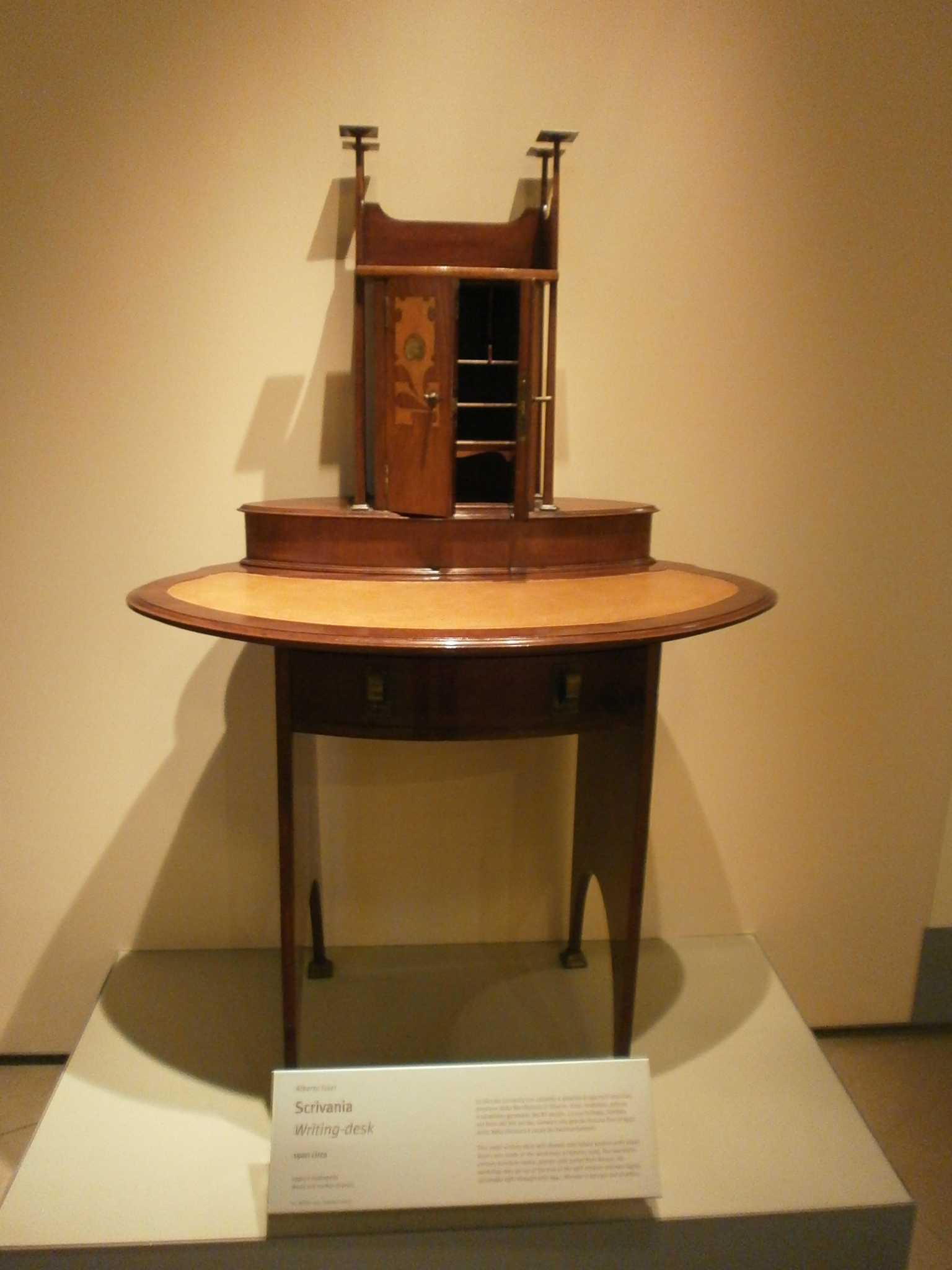
Writing desk, Alberto Issel, 1900.

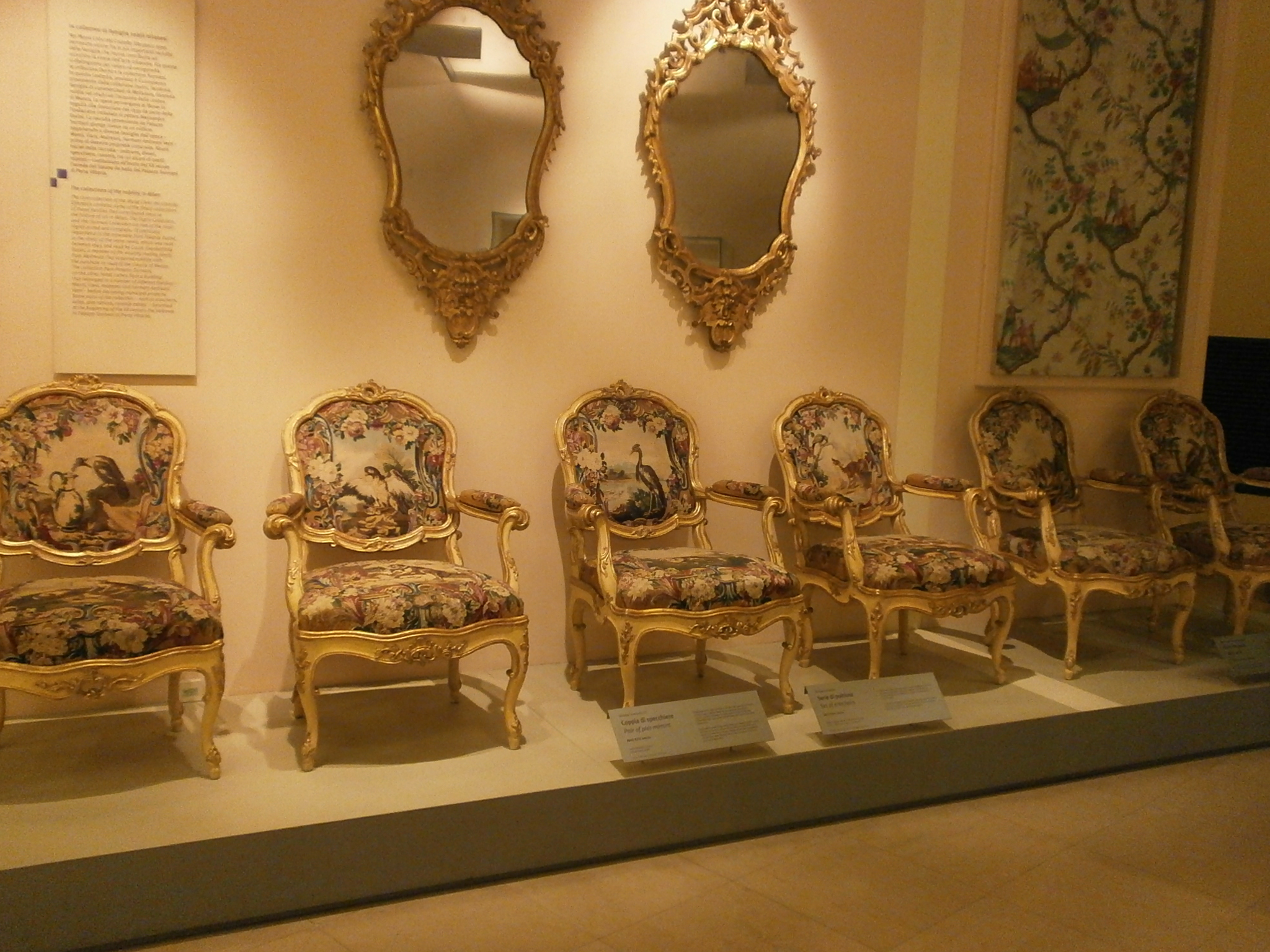
Set of armchairs, 18th century.

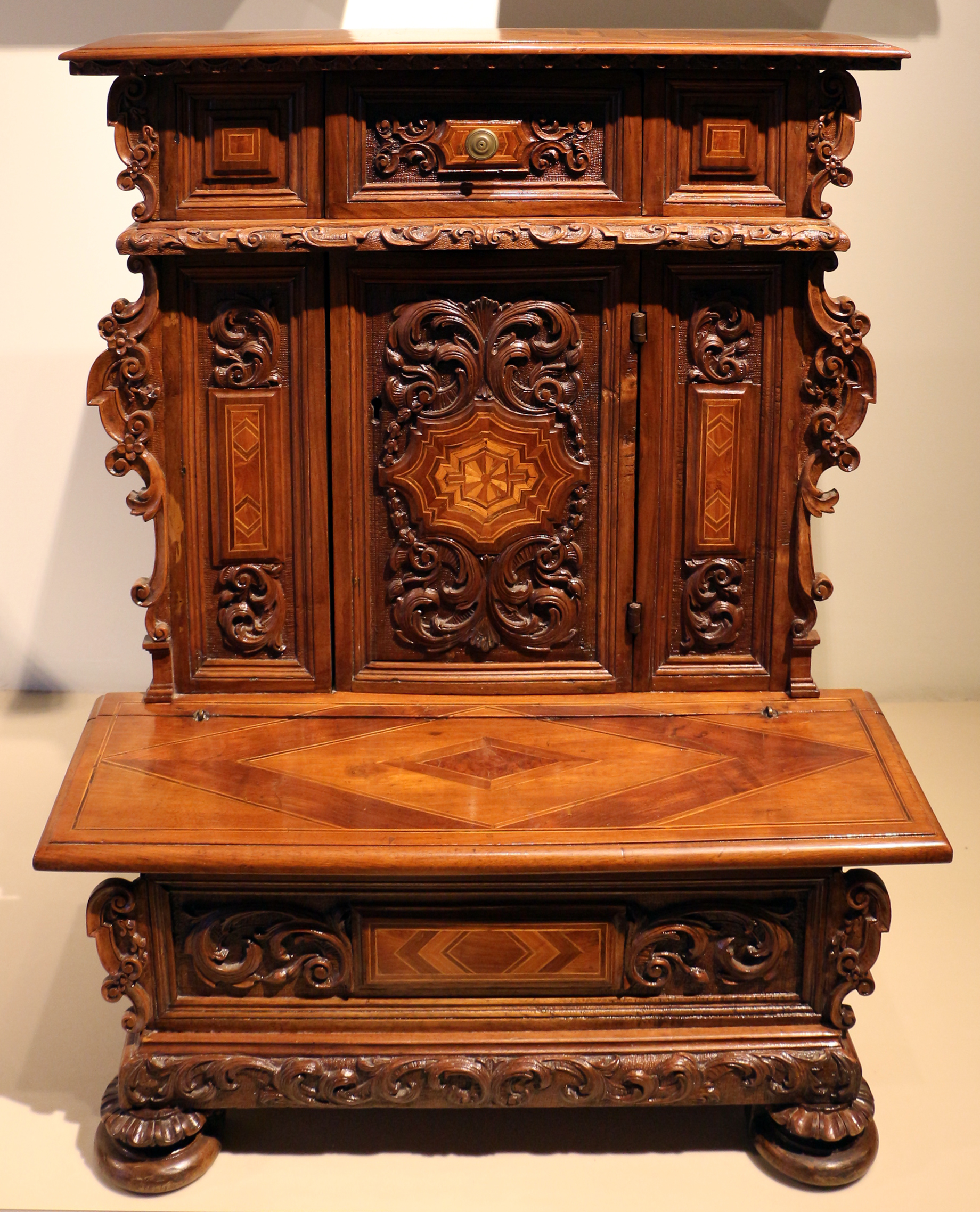
Kneeler, start of the 18th century.

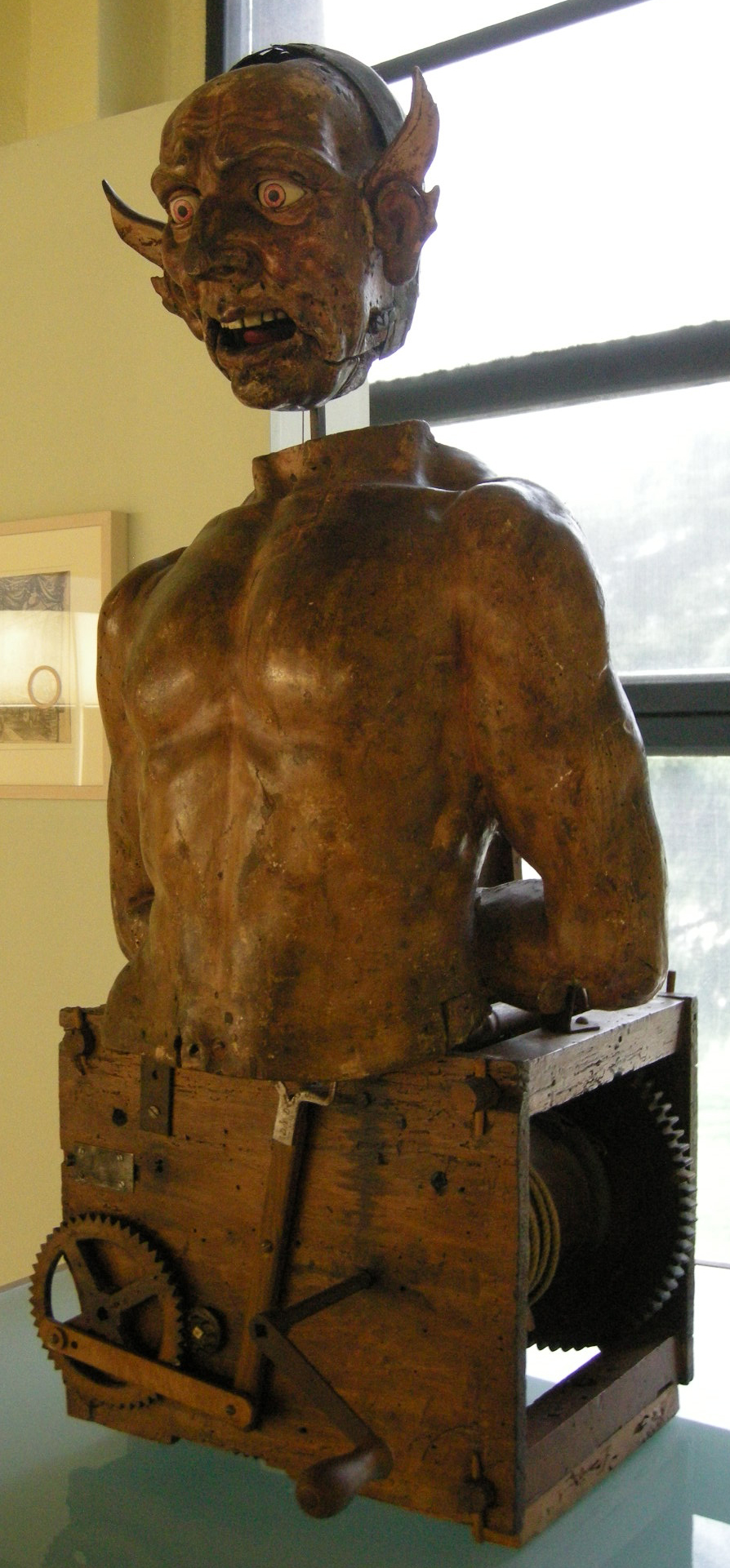
Ancient wooden automaton, 16th-17th century.
