= Ernesto Allason =

Italian painter

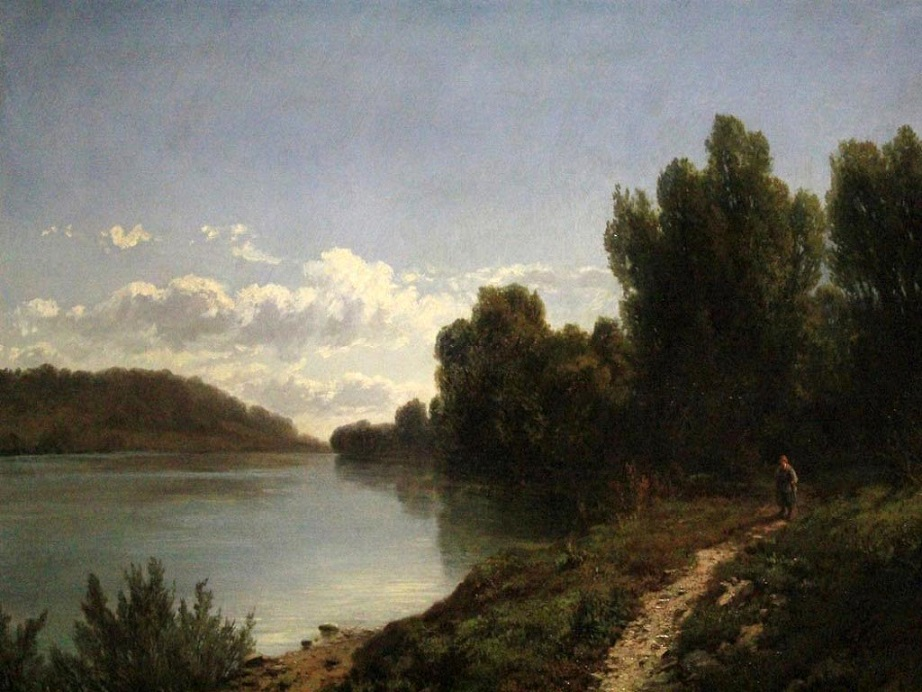
Paesaggio Lacustre

Ernesto Allason (Turin, 1822 – March 1, 1868) was an Italian painter.

== Biography ==
He was initially trained as a lawyer, but by 1843, he was studying art under the direction of the painter Carlo Piacenza. He specialized in landscapes. He was the tutor in arts to the Princess Margherita of Savoy, and was awarded the Cross of Order of Saints Maurice and Lazarus by the King. Ernesto Bertea was one of his pupils.
