= Return to the Sheepfold =

Painting by Carlo Pittara

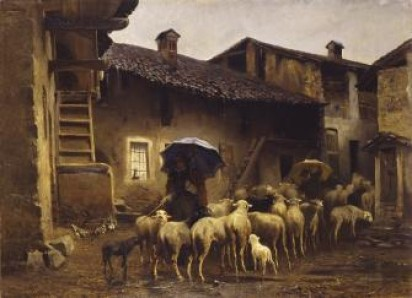
- Artist: Carlo Pittara
- Completion date: c. 1866
- Location: Painting

Return to the Sheepfold (Italian - Ritorno all'ovile) is a c. 1866 painting by Carlo Pittara, originally entitled The Return (Italian - La ritirata), now in the Galleria civica d'arte moderna e contemporanea in Turin.

== Exhibition history ==
- 1866, Mostra della Società Promotrice delle Belle Arti, Torino.
- 1991, Il lavoro e l'uomo Il lavoro dell'uomo da Goya a Kandinskij, Braccio di Carlo Magno, Città del Vaticano.
- 2019–2020, "La fiera di Saluzzo", mostra alla Galleria di Arte Moderna, Torino.

== Bibliography ==
- Griseri, Andreina. (1967). Il paesaggio nella pittura piemontese dell'Ottocento, Milano: Fabbri Editori, SBN IT\ICCU\SBL\0077415.
- Marini, Giuseppe Luigi, ed. (2016). Carlo Pittara e la scuola di Rivara: un momento magico dell'Ottocento pedemontano, Torino: Adarte, SBN IT\ICCU\LO1\1646275.
- Morello, Giuseppe, ed. (1991). Il lavoro dell'uomo da Goya a Kandinskij. Milano: Fabbri Editori. SBN IT\ICCU\RAV\0179129
