= Giuseppe Maggiolini =

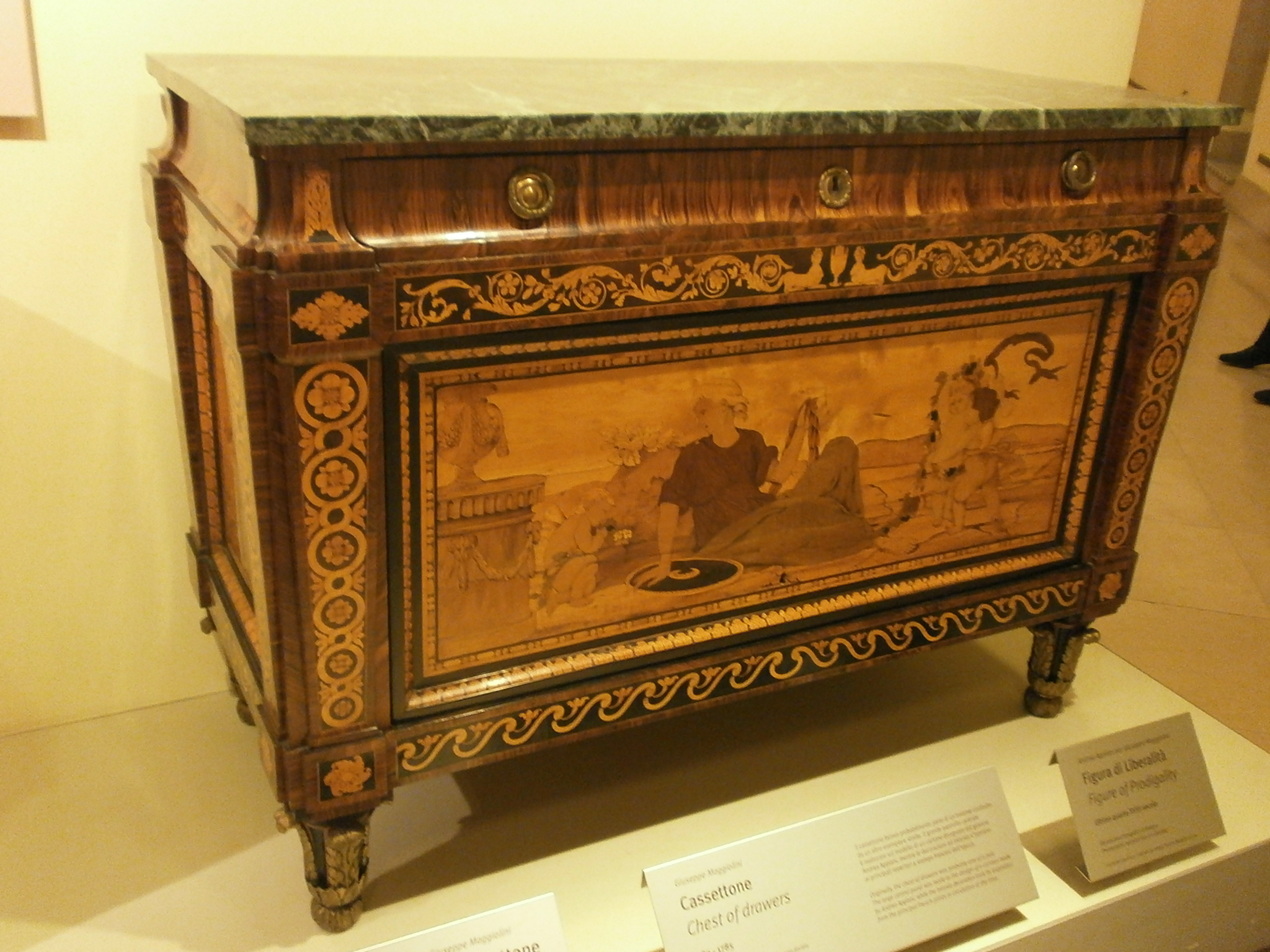
Chest of drawers by Giuseppe Maggiolini

Giuseppe Maggiolini (13 November 1738 – 16 November 1814), himself a marquetry-maker (intarsiatore), was the pre-eminent cabinet-maker (ebanista) in Milan in the later 18th century. Though some of his early work is Late Baroque in manner, his name is particularly associated with blocky neoclassical forms veneered with richly detailed marquetry vignettes, often within complicated borders. His workshop's output is somewhat repetitive, making attributions to Maggiolini a temptation. His clientele reached to Austria and Poland.

Born in Parabiago, near Milan, he was the son of Gilardo Maggiolini, a forester in the service of the Cistercian monastery of Sant'Ambrogio della Vittoria, and after apprenticeship in a woodworking shop he opened his own bottega in the town's central piazza, which today bears his name. In 1757 he married Antonia Vignati, from Villastanza; they had a single son, Francesco, born the following year.

The painter Giuseppe Levati consigned to Maggiolini work for marchese Pompeo Litta at Villa Litta, Lainate, near Milan, to Levati's designs, with unexpectedly fine results. Maggiolini was invited to collaborate on designs for the wedding of Archduke Ferdinand of Austria, the Habsburg governor of Lombardy, with Maria Beatrice d'Este, initiating Maggiolini's work for the Habsburgs, rulers of Lombardy, for which he opened a second workshop, in Milan. In 1771 Maggiolini produced the marquetry flooring in the Palazzo di Corte in Milan, being rebuilt under the direction of Giuseppe Piermarini, which put Maggiolini in contact with a wider circle of artists and designers: the painter Andrea Appiani and the architect Giocondo Albertolli. In 1777 he produced marquetry floors and furniture for the royal villa near Monza. Named intarsiatore to the Habsburg granducal court, by 1780 Maggiolini in his turn was able to commission from Piermarini a new façade for the Church of Saints Gervasio and Protasio in his natal Parabiago, and from Albertolli its internal redecoration.

Maggiolini's characteristic furniture consists of commodes and chests, coffers and writing-desks and tables, inlaid with a wide variety of European woods and exotic woods imported from abroad, used in their natural colors or tinted green, like blue or rose. Cartoons for execution in marquetry were provided by artists such as Levati and Appiani, and panels of pictorial marquetry were produced purely for displays as tours de force.

With the introduction of the more severe Empire style, featuring sober mahogany relieved by gilt-bronze mounts, and the flight of his patron the Archduke in 1796, Maggiolini was forced to retrench. In 1806, however, on extremely short notice, he was commissioned to produce a writing table in connection with Napoleon's coronation in Milan; this brought a resurgence of commissions, this time from Prince Eugène de Beauharnais and other Bonapartes, but in 1809 Maggiolini withdrew into retirement, as antipathy to the Napoleonic system and all connected with it increased in Milan.

Drawings from the workshop, which was continued by his son Carlo Francesco in partnership with Cherubino Mezzanzanica (died 1866), are in the Fondo Maggioliniano in the Antique Furniture & Wooden Sculpture Museum of Sforza Castle, Milan. They continue to permit new attributions, such as the late 18th-century table acquired by the Getty Museum.
