= Alberto Maso Gilli =

Italian painter and lawyer

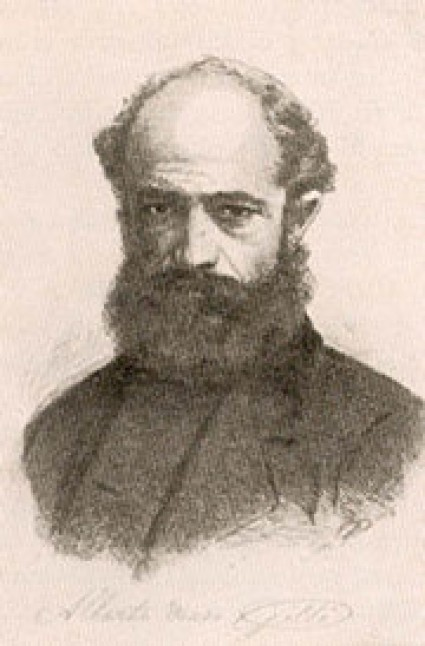
Portrait of Alberto Maso Gilli

Alberto Maso Gilli (1840-1894) was an Italian painter, but mainly remembered as an engraver.

He was born in Chieri. He trained at the Accademia Albertina. He painted a number of vistas of landmarks and landscapes around Chieri. He worked with "The Art in Italy" and "The Art", the newspaper of Paris, where he moved in 1873, where he garnered first prize in the engraving section in the International Exhibition of 1878. In 1881 he returned to Turin, to become a professor at the Albertina Academy and, when Federico Pastoris died, he was appointed superintendent of the Art schools in Turin. At the general exhibition of Turin in 1884, he helped design many of the projects. In 1885, he moved to Rome to become Director of Regia Calcografia, and helped establish a school for print engraving.

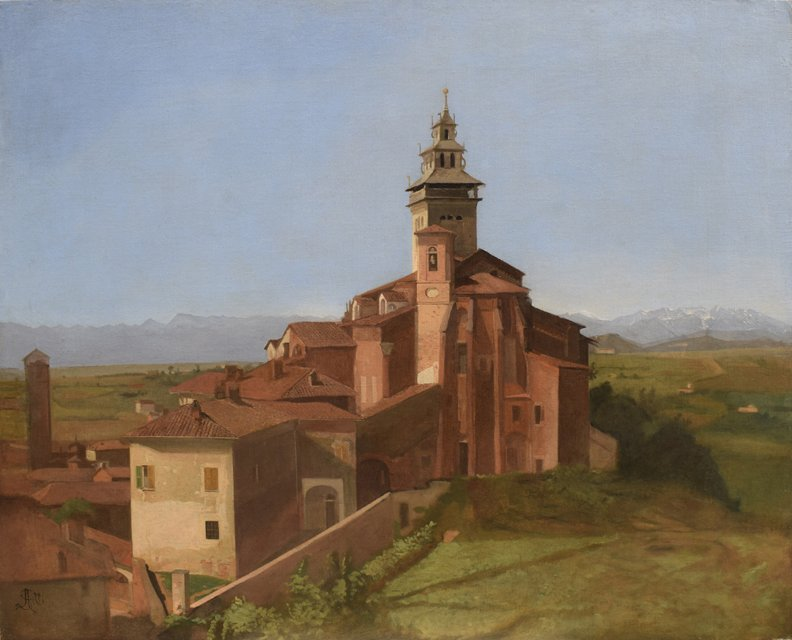
Vedute of the Church of San Giorgio, Chieri

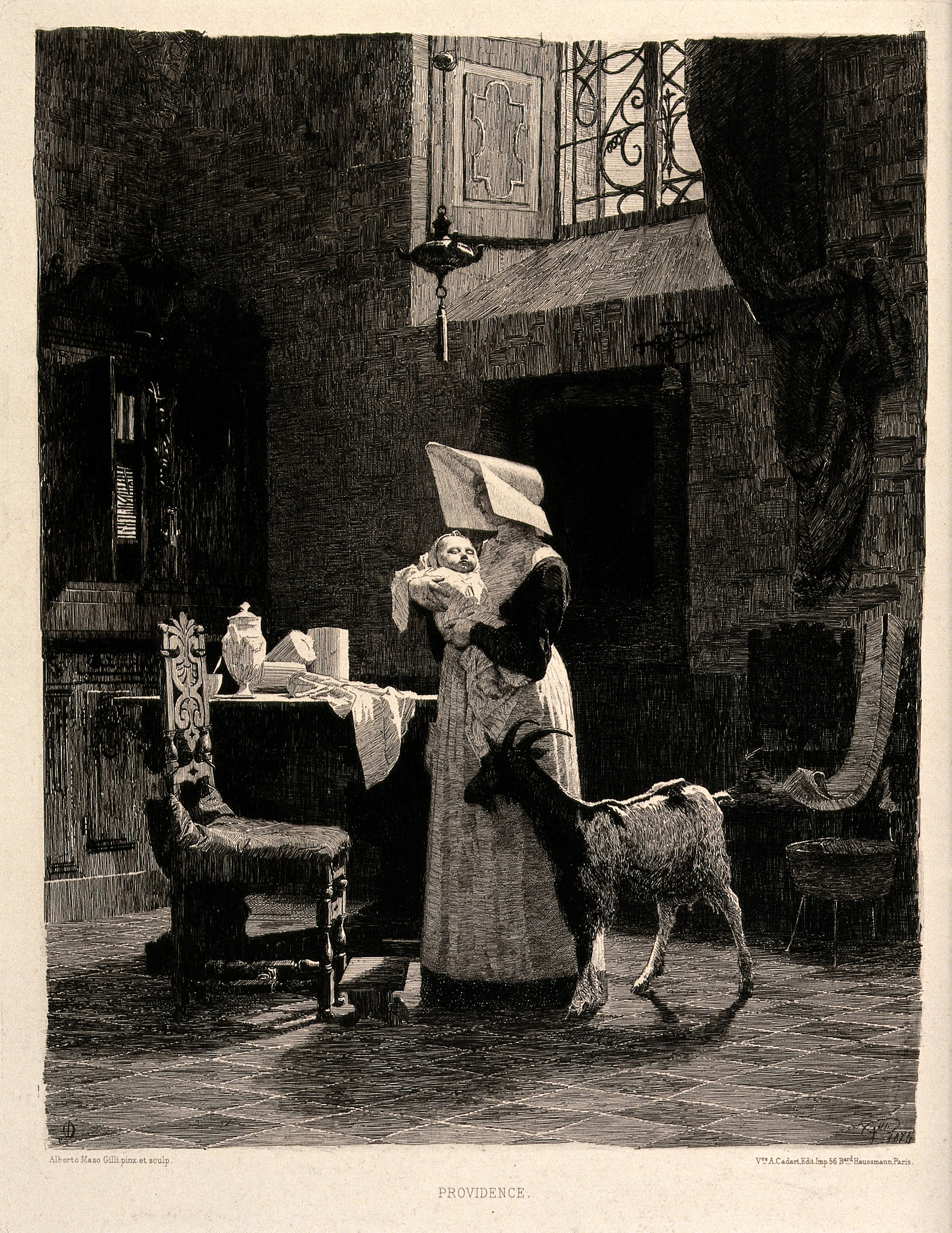
An orphan baby being taken care by a nun

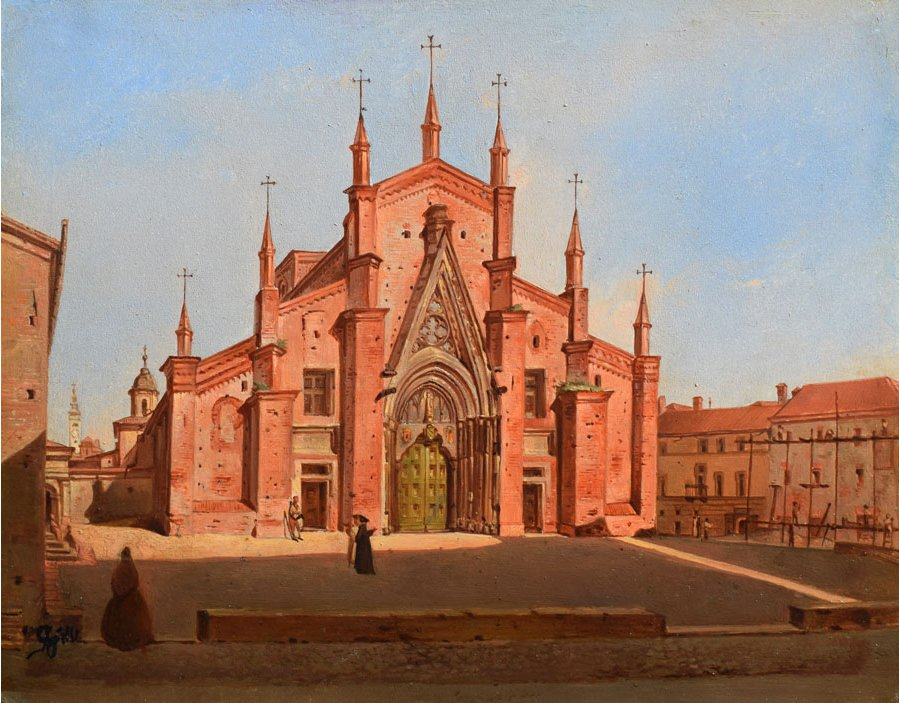
Duomo of Chieri
