= Alfredo Luxoro =

Italian painter

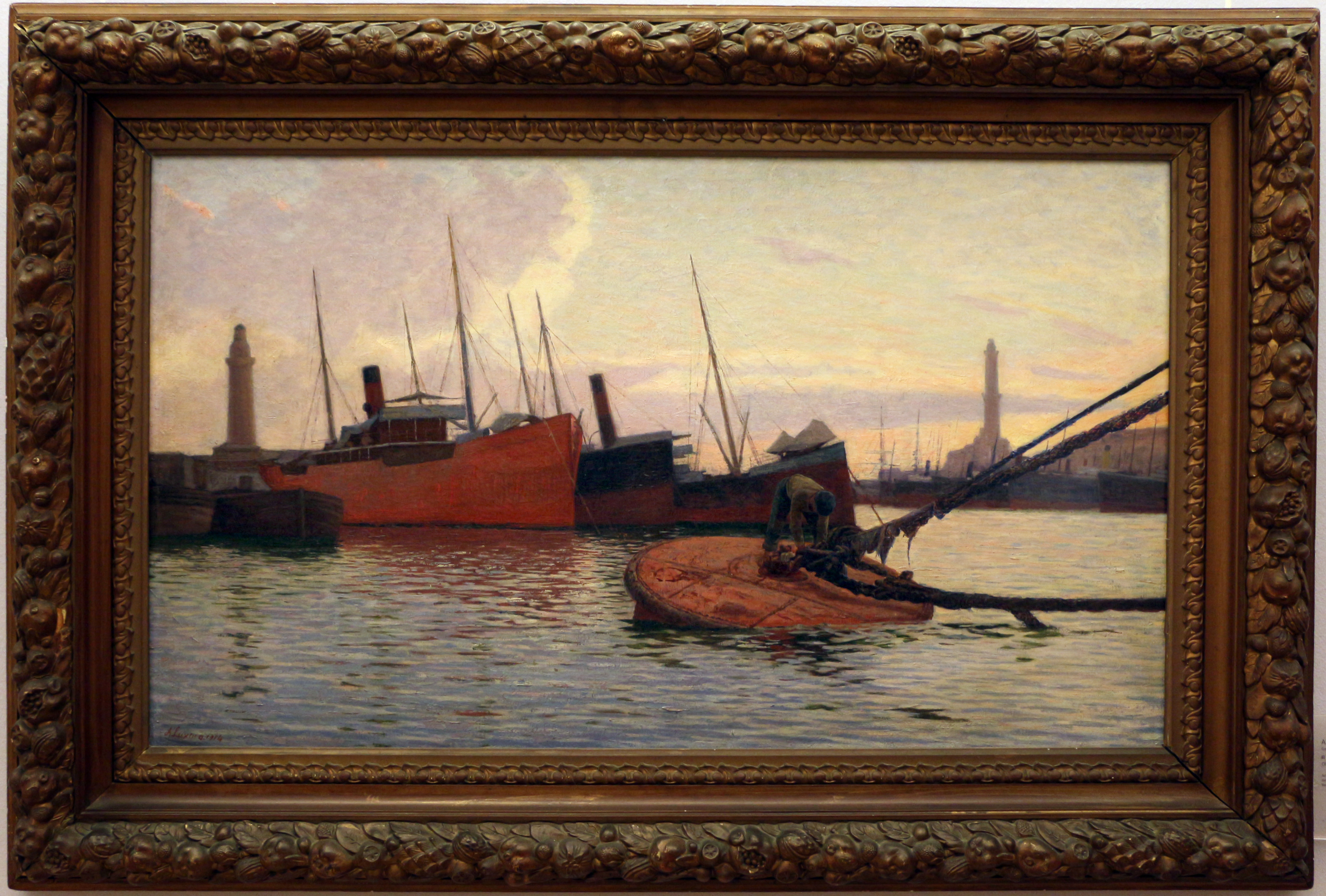
- Il porto, [The Port] painting by Alfred Luxoro, 1914
- Born: 1859; Genoa, Kingdom of Sardinia
- Died: 1918 (aged 58–59)
- Known for: Painter; teacher
- Movement: Orientalist

Alfredo Luxoro (1859–1918) was an Italian painter, mainly of Marine landscapes, genre, and orientalist themes.

== Biography ==
Born in Genoa, he was the son of Tammar, a professor of landscape painting at the Academy of Fine Arts (Accademia Ligustica) of Genoa. He was influenced by the painters of the School of Rivara. He displayed one of his first works, Al mare, at the Florentine Mostra of 1877, the next year at the Genoese Promotrice, Fra gli scogli di Quinto. In 1889 at Turin, he exhibited Le sue marine and A prua e A poppa. In 1881 at Milan, he exhibited Nettuno, a seascape; and a half-figure of a man titled Cipollaro. In 1883 in Rome, he exhibited Alla marina; and in 1884 at Turin, a painting titled Grigio. He also painted Spes, a genre work of melancholy depicting a woman sitting by the seashore. At the same exhibition he displayed another canvas titled Ship Light. He also painted portraits including that of the painter Nicolò Barabino. He painted frescoes in the parish church of Carcare, and for the Chamber of Commerce and the Prefecture of Genoa. In 1899, upon the death of his father, he assumed direction of the teaching of landscape painting at the Accademia Ligustica.

In 1905, after long delays, the Chiossone Museum of Oriental Art was opened in Genoa by Alfredo, and Pica presented it to public on the magazine Emporium.

== See also ==
- List of Orientalist artists
- Orientalism
