= Giuseppe Craffonara =

Italian painter and illustrator

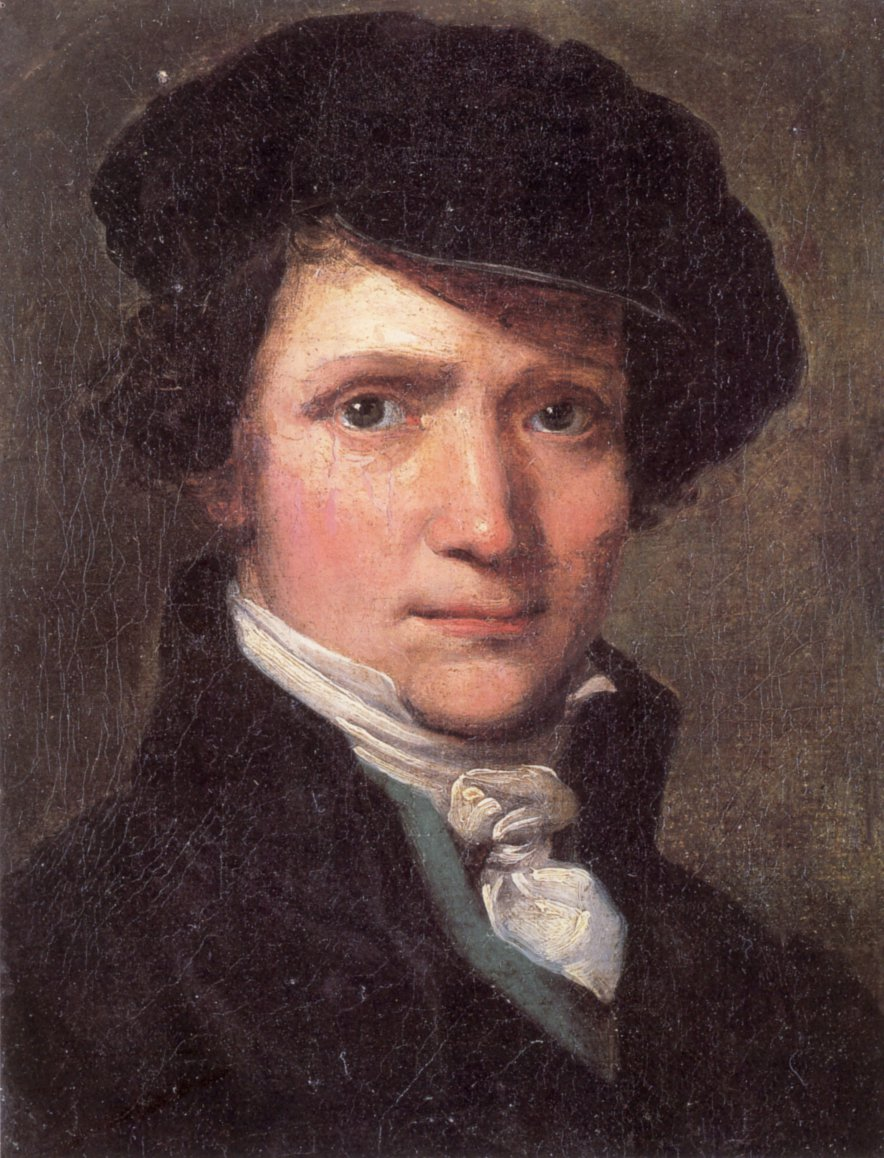
Giuseppe Craffonara, self-portrait

Giuseppe Craffonara (September 7, 1790 – August 12, 1837) was an Italian painter originally from Val Badia.

== Biography ==
He was instructed by the painter Pietro Cannella from a young age.

After having studied at the Verona Academy of Painting, in 1816 he arrived at the Academy of Saint Luke in Rome, where he remained until 1830. During the Roman period he was active in the contemporary laboratory at the Chiaramonti Gallery in the Vatican Museums. Between 1824 and 1830 he made numerous trips from Rome, linked to subsequent commissions received in Trentino.

The first Trentino commission is the San Vigilio in Gloria for the parish of Stenico, built in 1825. There are also many private commissions mainly linked to the image of the Madonna.

Towards the end of 1830 Craffonara definitively returned to his homeland and completed the altarpiece of the Assumption for the parish church of Santa Maria Assunta in Riva del Garda and the controversial frescoes of the Via Crucis for the cemetery in Bolzano. In 1835 he renounced the post of director of the Academy of Fine Arts in Prague due to health problems. He died two years later, on 12 August, in his house in Riva del Garda.

Among his works is also worth mentioning a canvas preserved in the church of San Tommaso Apostolo in Padaro di Arco.
