= Biblioteca Civica Berio =

Library in Italy

Coordinates: 44.40501°N 8.93714°E

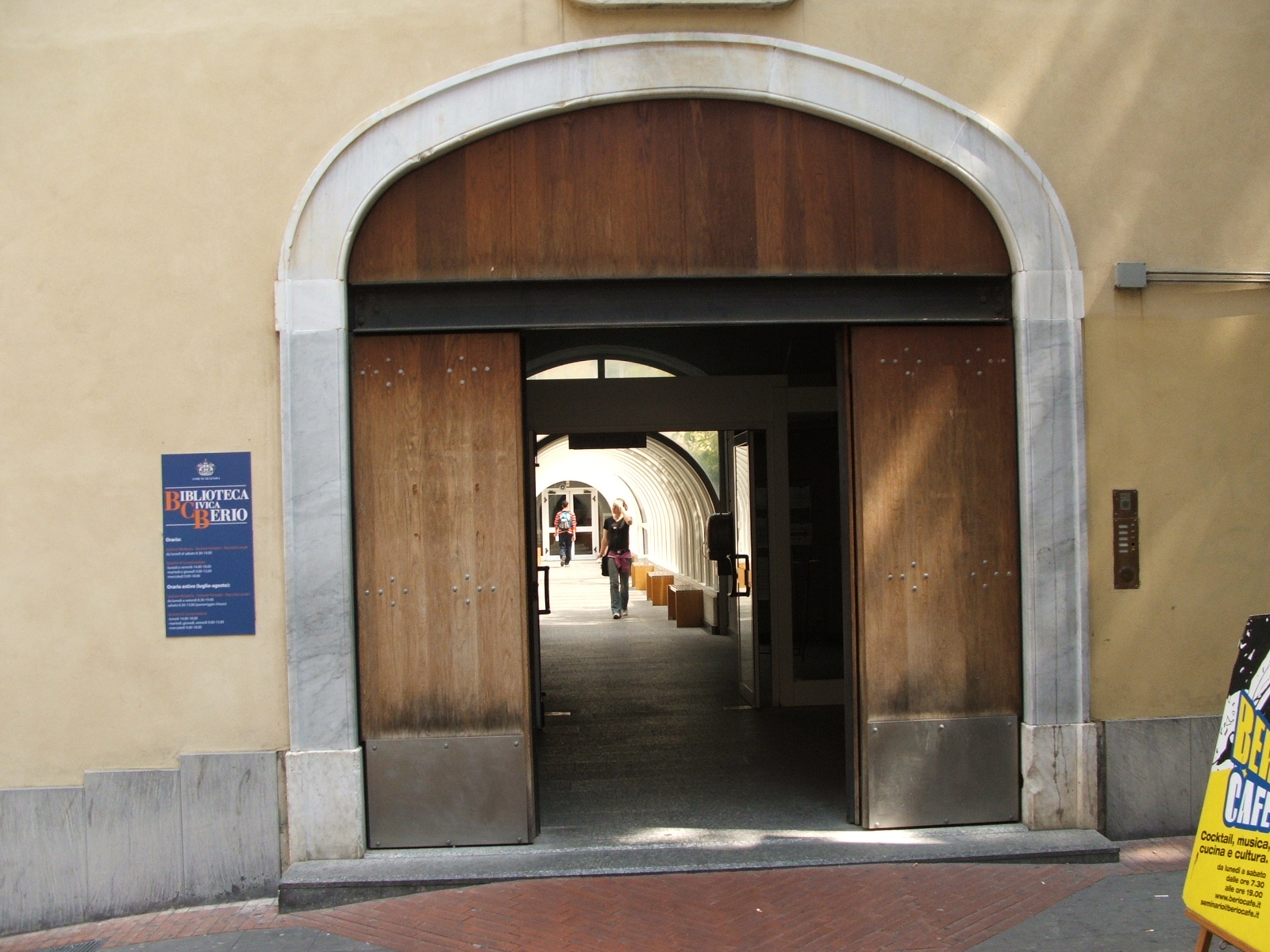
Entrance to the Biblioteca Civica Berio in Genoa (photo circa 2007)

The Biblioteca Civica Berio (est. 1775) of Genoa, Italy, is a public library founded by Carlo Giuseppe Vespasiano Berio. Around 1998 it moved into the former Seminario arcivescovile di Genova in the Carignano quartiere. Among its collections is the library of Demetrio Canevari.

== Bibliography ==
in English

- Paul Oskar Kristeller (December 1977). "Genova". Iter Italicum: a finding list of uncatalogued or incompletely catalogued humanistic manuscripts of the Renaissance in Italian and other libraries. Vol. 1: Italy A-N. Brill. pp. 238+. ISBN 9004069259. 1977?
- Ennio Sandal (1990). "Endowed Municipal Public Libraries". Libraries & Culture. 25 (3: Libraries and Librarianship in Italy). USA: 358–371. JSTOR 25542275.

in Italian

- Laura Malfatto (2005). "La biblioteca di un medico tra fine Cinquecento e primo Seicento: il fondo Canevari della Biblioteca Berio di Genova". Medicina Nei Secoli: Arte e Scienza (in Italian). 17. ISSN 0394-9001.
