= Ernesto Rayper =

Italian painter (1840–1873)

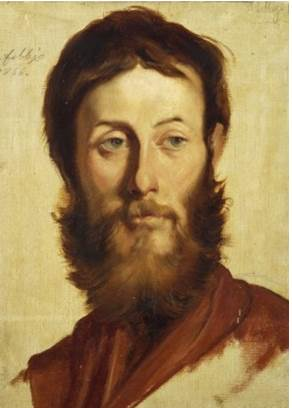
Ernesto Rayper. Portrait by Francesco Gandolfi (1824–1873)

Ernesto Rayper (1 November 1840 – 5 August 1873) was an Italian painter and engraver. He was the founder of what came to be known as the Scuola grigia (Gray School) of landscape painting and was associated with the Macchiaioli.

== Biography ==
He was born in Genoa. In 1859, after receiving his basic education at a Piarist school and the Collegio dei Tolomei in Siena, he enrolled in courses at the Accademia Ligustica di Belle Arti and took lessons from Tammar Luxoro. Under his influence, he decided to specialize in landscapes. During 1860, he spent some time in Geneva at the workshops of Alexandre Calame.

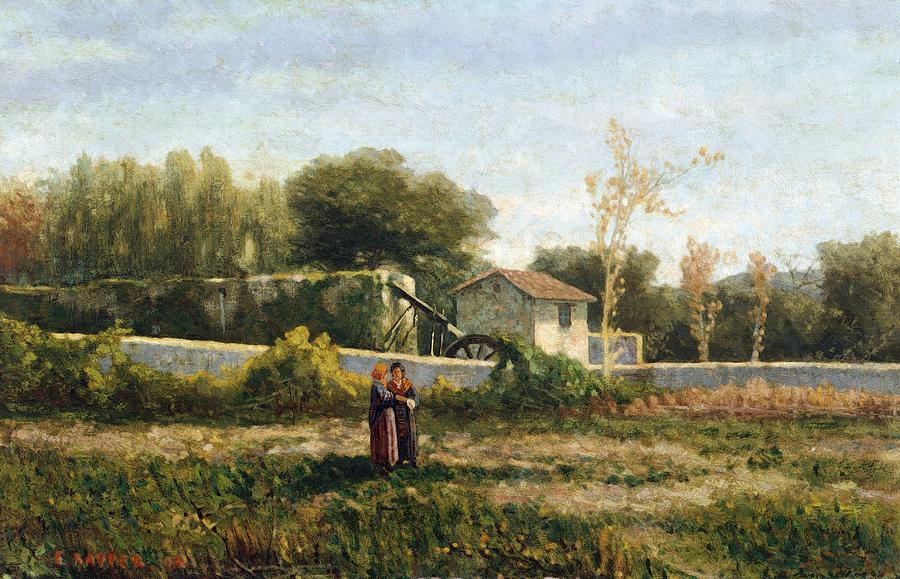
Rural Landscape

Upon returning to Genoa, he strove to develop his own style, distinct from the current Romantic and Academic trends. He had his first exhibit at the Society for the Promotion of Fine Arts in 1862. The following year, he began promoting the concept of plein aire painting and the Scuola grigia, so-named for Rayper's avoidance of the color black, took shape. Over the next few years, he was joined by Alfredo d'Andrade, a Portuguese immigrant who was also an archaeologist, Alberto Issel and Serafín Avendaño, a Galician painter living in Genoa. Later, he began working with a group of artists from Canavese, led by Carlo Pittara.

In 1870, he was named a "Professor of Merit" at the Accademia Ligustica and won a gold medal at the "Esposizione Nazionale di Parma".

The following year, he developed a cancerous tumor on his tongue. After travelling throughout Italy, seeking an effective treatment, he retired to a small town in Savona and died there, aged only thirty-three.

After his death, his work became somewhat neglected until 1926, when a major exhibition was held at the Teatro Carlo Felice. Further exhibitions were held in 1938 at the Palazzo Rosso and in 1974, at his alma mater, the Accademia Ligustica; sponsored by the City of Genoa.
