= Ernesto Bertea =

Italian painter (1836–1904)

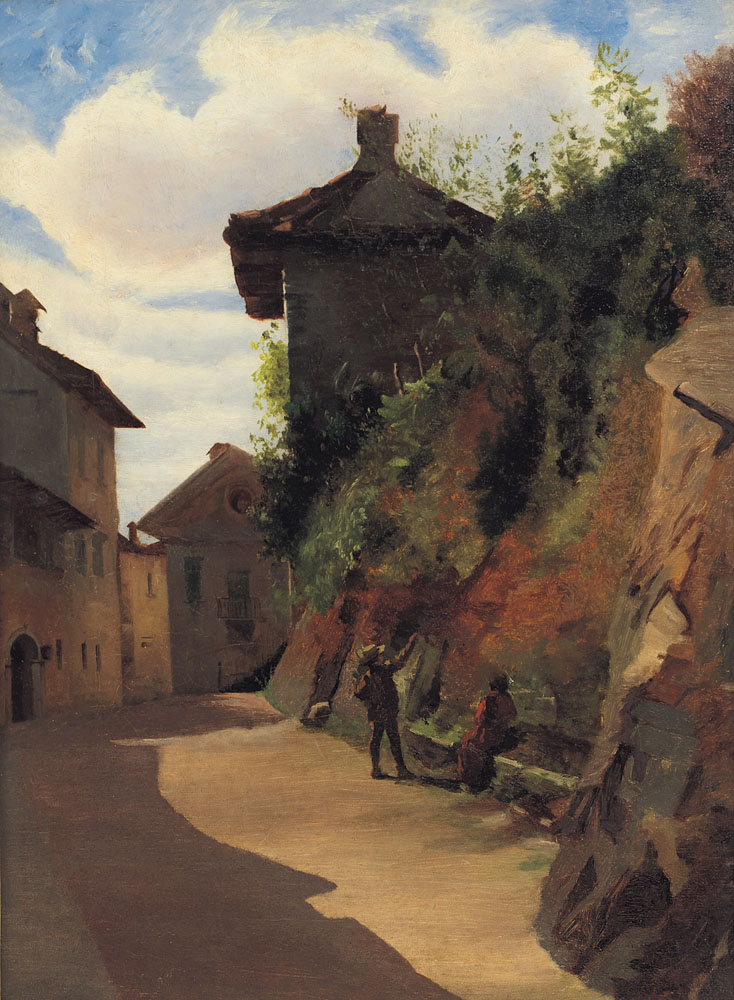
Country District

Ernesto Bertea (1836–1904) was an Italian painter, mainly of landscapes and genre paintings.

== Biography ==
He was born and lived in Turin. He studied with Ernesto Allason, then was influenced by the Swiss painter Edmond Castan and finally by the Barbizon School painter Constant Troyon in Paris.

He also worked in painting ceramics and watercolors. At the 1880 Esposizione Nazionale of Turin del 1880, he displayed: La Chiavica; Rio Secco; A Pasture in Flatlands; In val d'Aosta; and Bay of Pollenza; as well as three watercolors: Pecarry in Pasture; Mill; and Prime foglie. At the 1883 Exhibition of Fine Arts in Rome he exhibited Patrimonio di Beppino,: Novembre; L'antico porto di fondo Foce sul Lago Maggiore. He also displayed Il Mucrone d'Andarne, at the 1887 Esposizione di Belle Arti of Venice .
