= Serafín Avendaño =

Spanish painter (1838–1916)

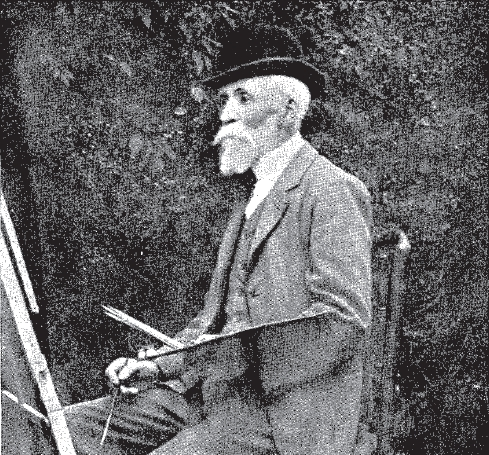
Serafín Avendaño (photograph from Blanco y Negro).

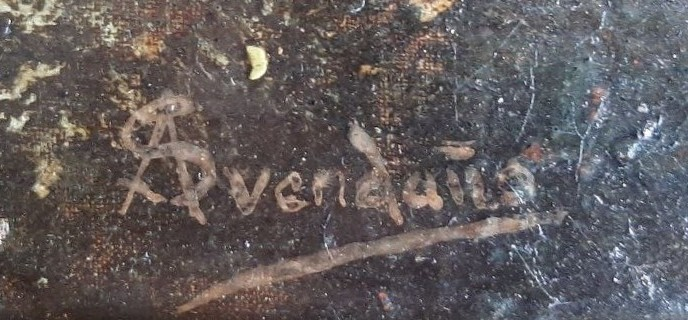
Signature of Serafín Avendaño on his "Landscape with River".

Serafín Xoaquín Avendaño Martínez (12 October 1838 – 23 August 1916) was a Galician landscape and genre painter who spent many years living in Italy.

== Biography ==
Serafín Avendaño was born in Vigo. His father was a professor. When he was still very young, the family moved to Madrid, where he received his first art lessons at the Real Academia de Bellas Artes de San Fernando from Antonio María Esquivel and Jenaro Pérez Villaamil. In 1858, he won a silver medal at the Exposición de Galiza for his watercolour "A miña tristura" (My Sadness). Although initially influenced by the landscape style of the Belgian-born painter Carlos de Haes, he eventually acquired a brighter palette.

Thanks to his family's relative wealth, he was able to travel extensively during the 1860s, visiting the United States (where he painted Niagara Falls), England, France and Switzerland. In 1864, he won a medal at the prestigious National Exhibition of Fine Arts. In 1866, after receiving a grant, he went to Italy for further studies and remained there until 1891. Most of his time in Italy was spent in and around Genoa, where he became associated with the "Scuola di Rivara", a local group of landscape painters. Periodically, he travelled to Spain to participate in various expositions and work on the family estate near Vigo.

After his return, he sat as a judge on several art juries and provided illustrations for the magazine Blanco y Negro from 1893 to 1911. He won two more medals at the National Exhibition, in 1892 and 1899. Eventually, he retired to Valladolid, where he died of atherosclerosis in 1916. Numerous exhibitions of his works were held in Italy up through the 1930s.

== Selected paintings ==
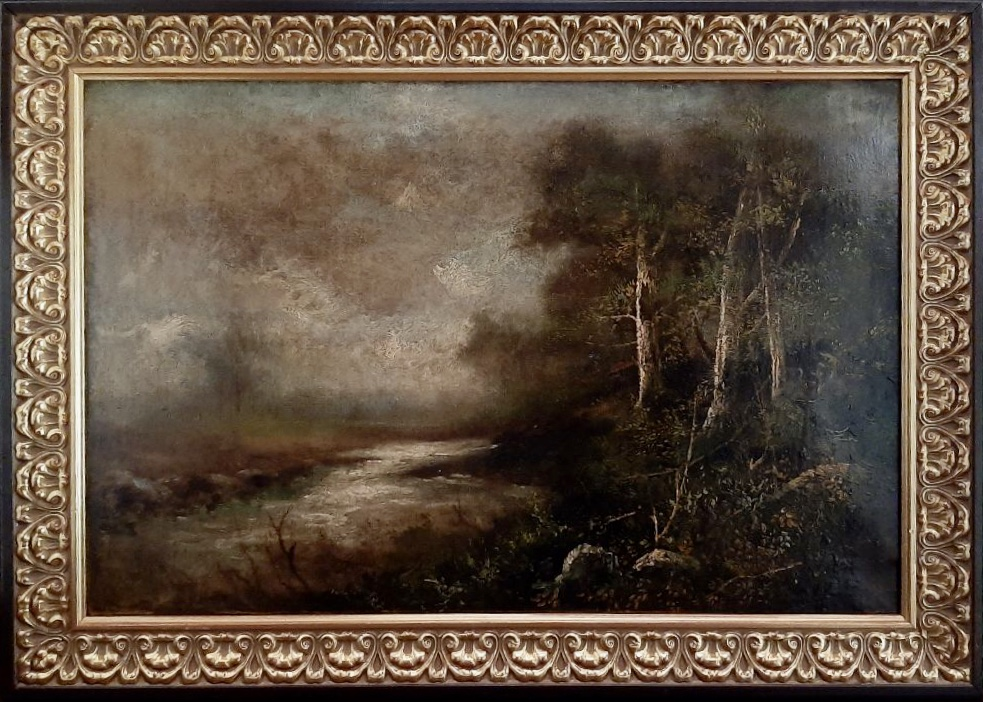
Landscape with River

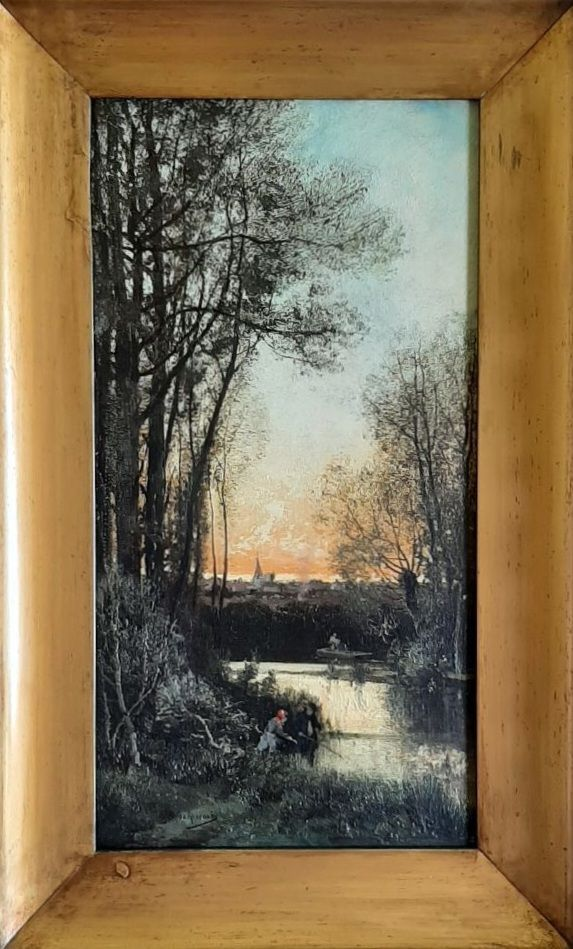
Landscape with Lake

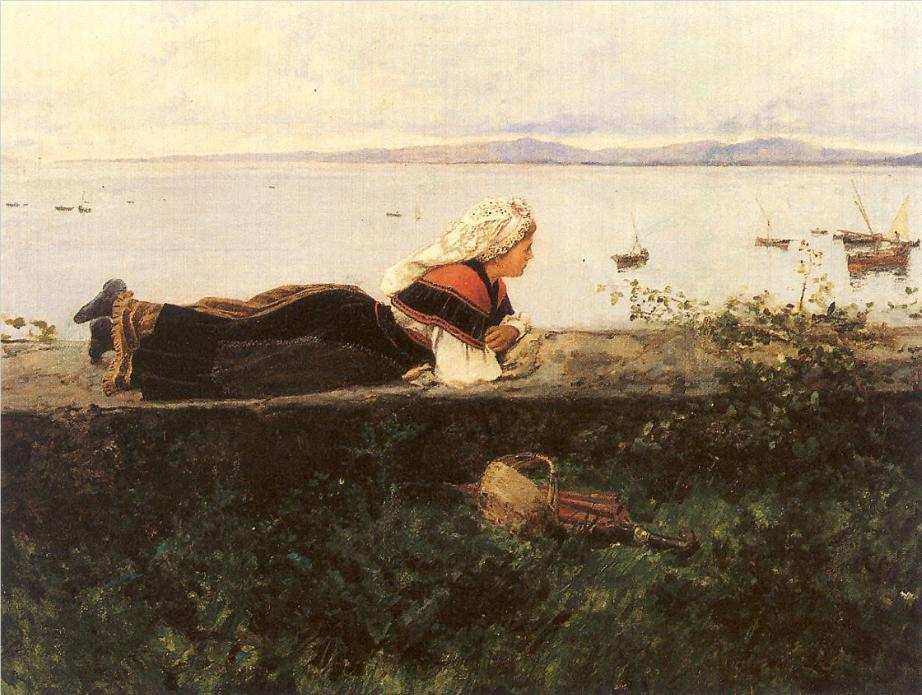
Landscape with
Galician Woman

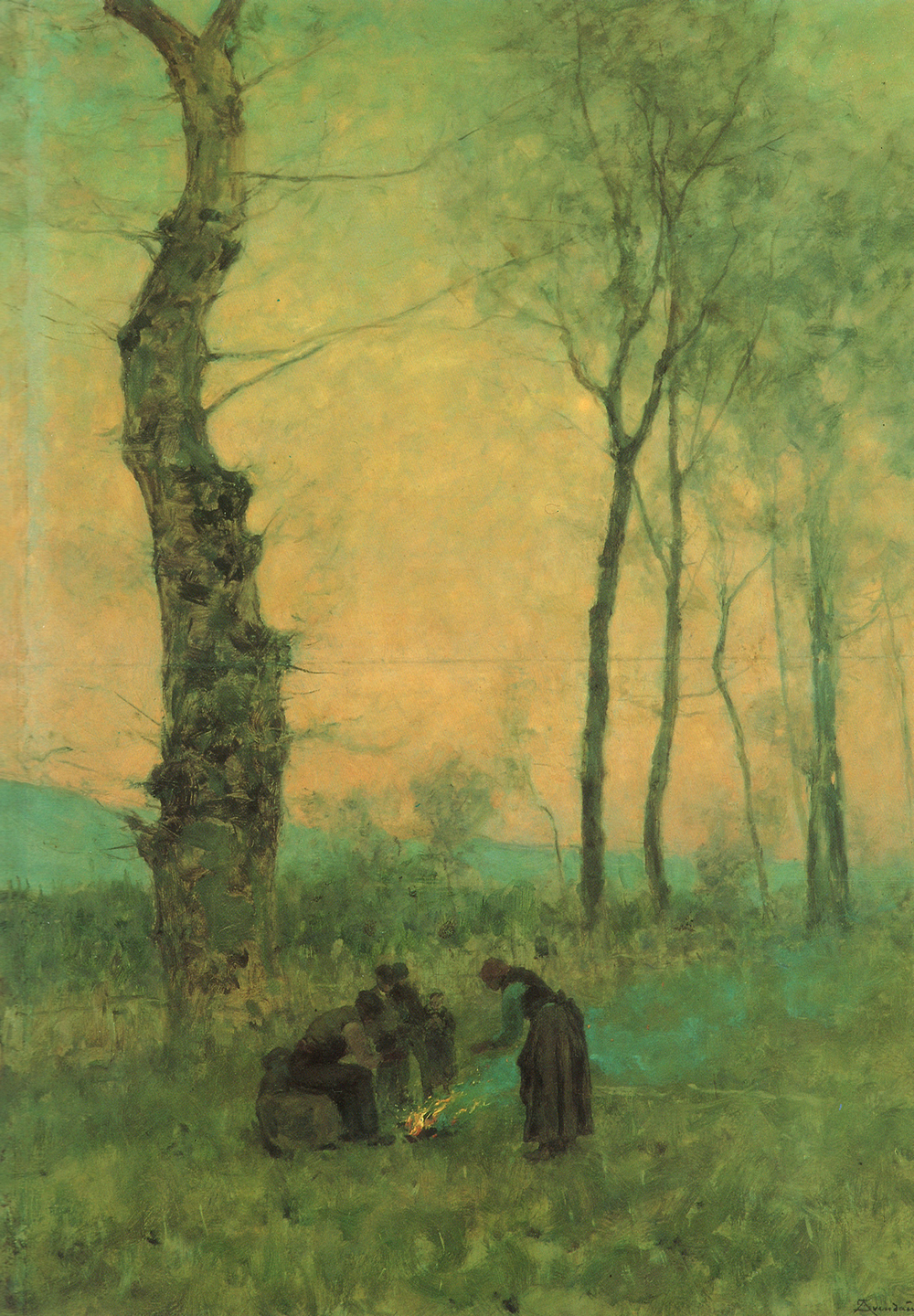
Winter Landscape

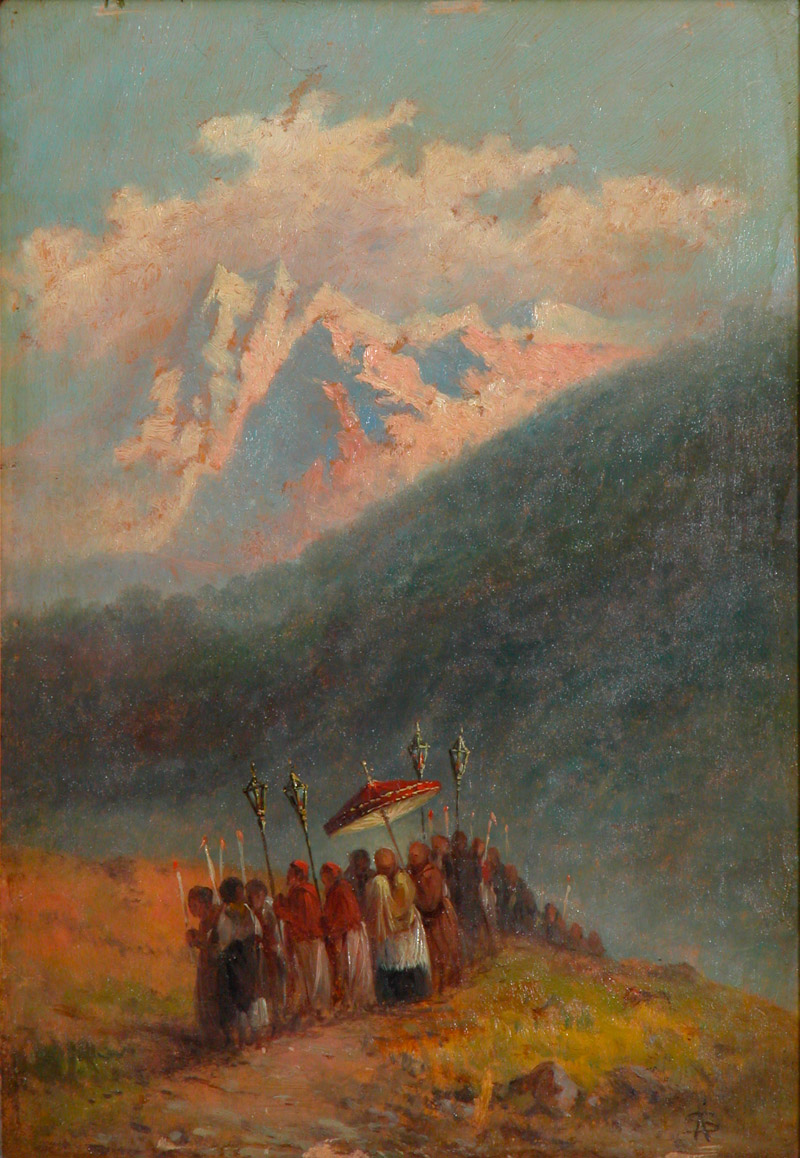
Procession

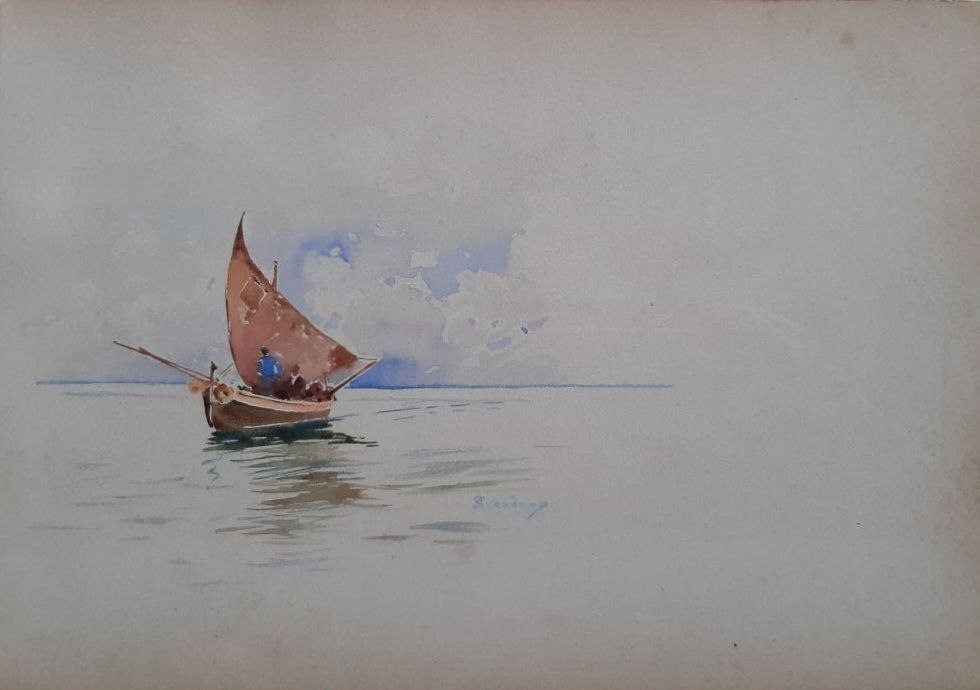
Marine

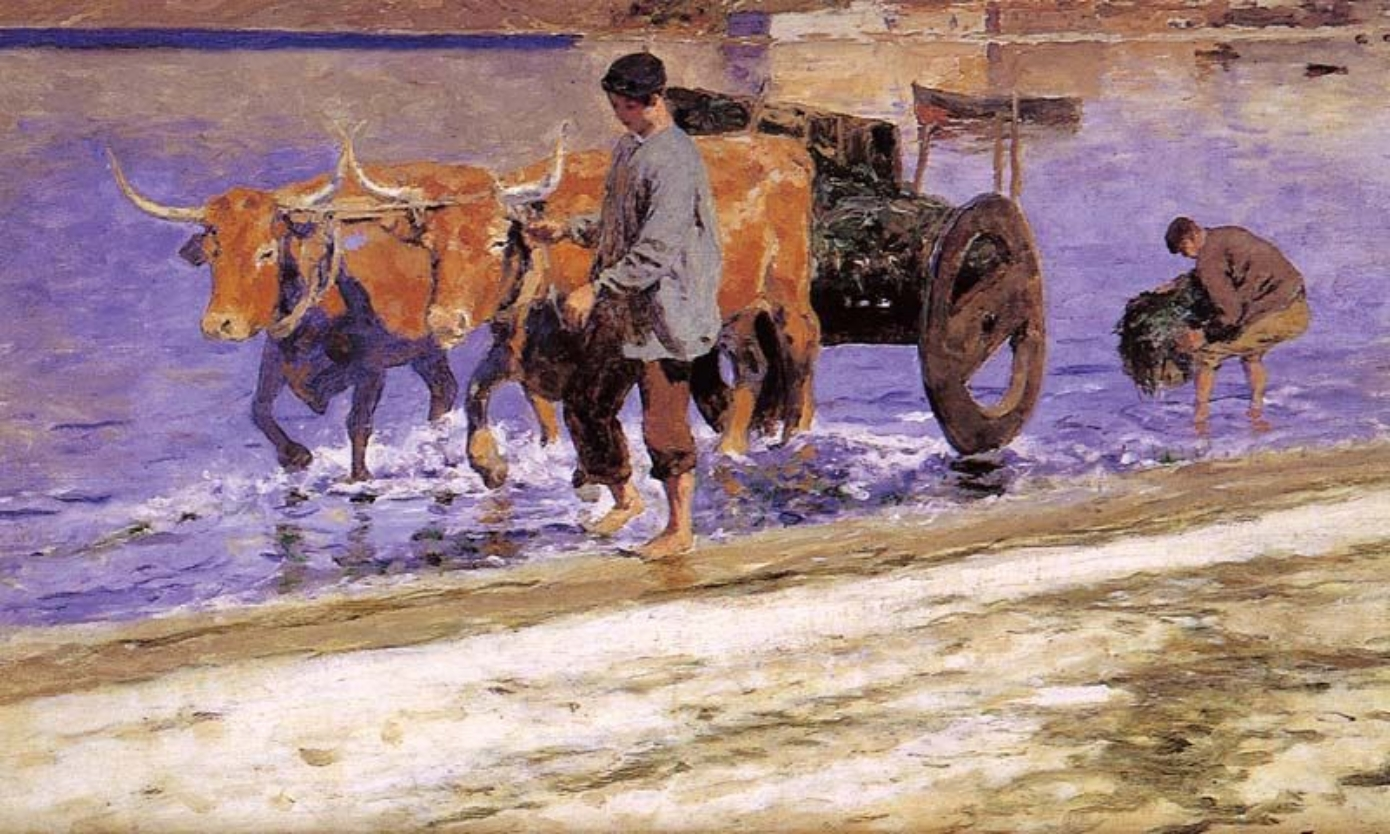
A Cartful of Seaweed
