= Alberto Issel =

Italian painter

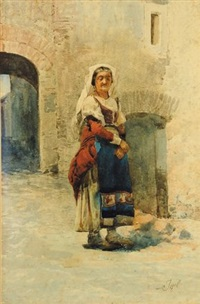
Figure in Traditional Costume

Alberto Issel (1848–1926) was an Italian painter.

== Biography ==
He was a resident of Genoa and a pupil of the Accademia Ligustica. He won awards while a student for engravings in 1869 and 1870. He then studied in Florence under Markó the Younger. He frequented the company of the Macchiaioli at the Caffè Michelangiolo, then moved to Rome where he was influenced by the circle formed around Mariano Fortuny. He participated briefly in the Garibaldi exhibitions, and painted military subjects. In 1872, he worked along with Ernesto Rayper in the School of Rivara, who like the earlier Macchiaioli delighted in painting out of doors.

He frequently painted landscapes. Among his main works: Armonie exhibited in 1877 in Naples; Recidiro; Tempo piovoso, and Uomini di punto exhibited in 1880 at Turin; Ricordi di riviera exhibited in 1881 in Milan. He also painted various oil and watercolor seascapes. After 1880, an ocular malady impaired his ability to paint.
