= Portoria =

District of Genoa, Italy

Coordinates: 44°24′25″N 8°56′12″E

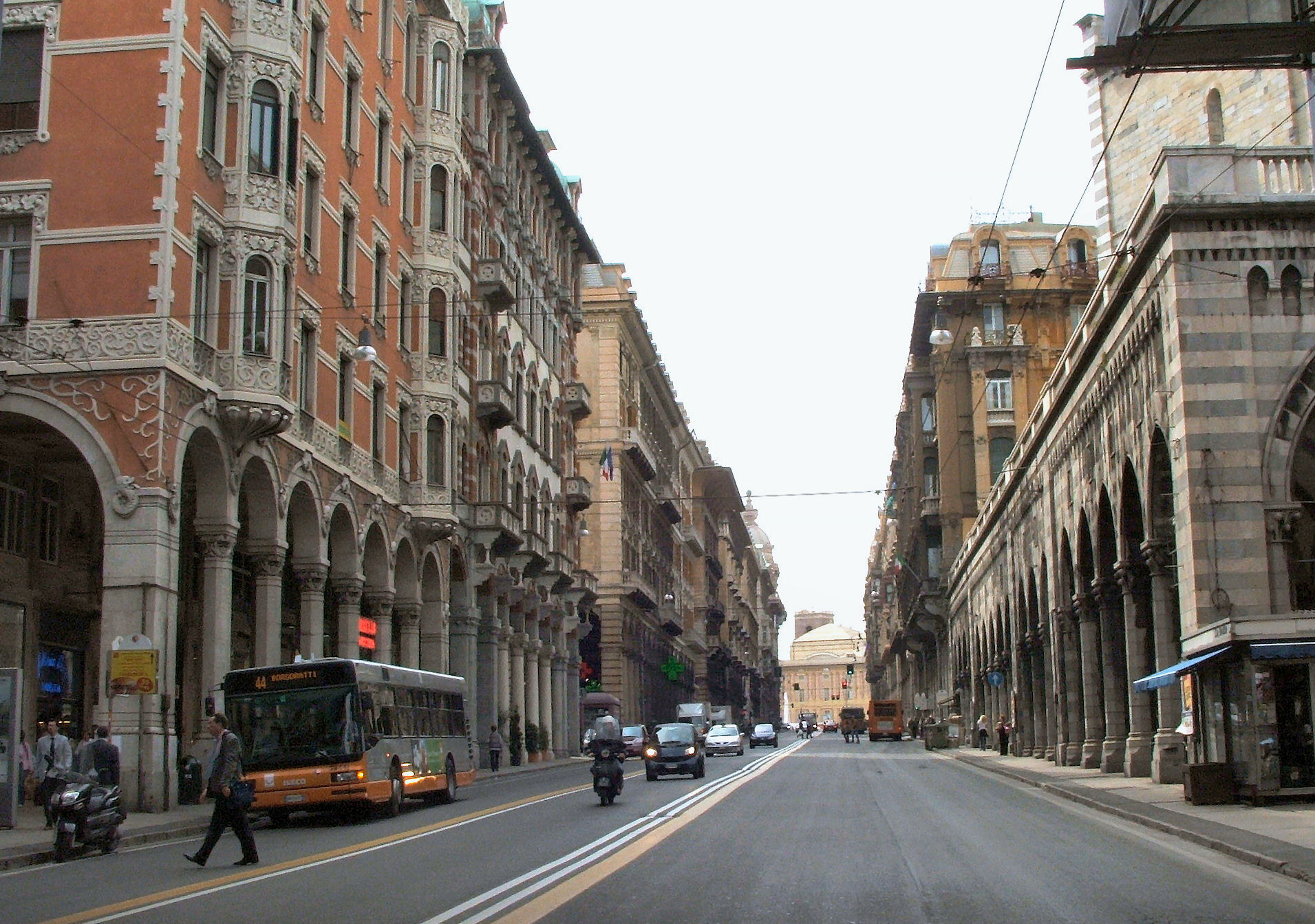
- View of Via XX Settembre from the Monumental Bridge, toward Piazza De Ferrari

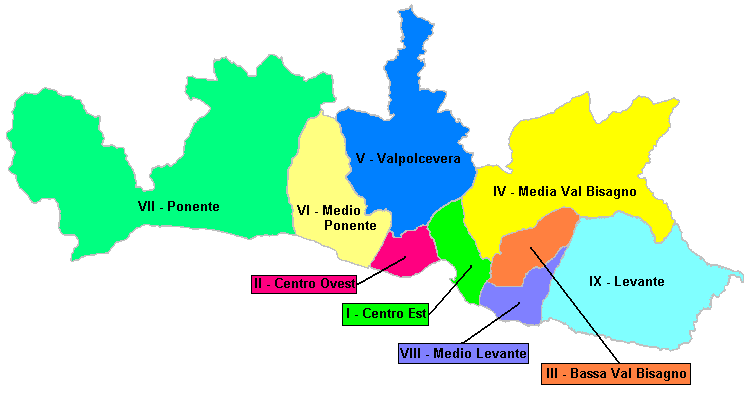
- Map of the districts of Genoa
- Country: Italy
- Region: Liguria
- Province: Genoa
- City: Genoa
- Circoscrizione: Municipio I Centro Est
- Neighborhood: Portoria
- Other neighborhoods: San Vincenzo, Carignano
- Postal code: 16121 - 16122
- Area: 0,685 km²
- Population: 5,262
- Density: 7 681,75 Inh./km²

Portoria (Portöia /puɾˈtɔːja/ in Ligurian) is a central district of Genoa, administratively included in Municipio I Centro Est.

It was one of the sestieri into which the city of Genoa was anciently divided. Its name is linked to the revolt against the Austrians on December 5, 1746, which began with the famous Balilla episode.

For centuries a working-class and suburban neighborhood, although included within the city walls, with the urban expansion of the late 19th century it became the center of the modern city. Included in the Portoria area are some of the main streets and squares of downtown Genoa: Piazza De Ferrari, Piazza Dante, Piazza Corvetto, part of the very central Via XX Settembre, the main artery of Genoa's commercial area, and Via Roma.

== Neighborhood description ==
=== Toponym ===
The name derives from the presence of a gate in the so-called Barbarossa walls for having been built in the 12th century, around 1155, in view of the approaching German emperor. This gate was called Porta Aurea, or Porta d'Oria (because it was located at the limits of the Doria family's property), a name that in contraction into Genoese became Portóia. Its remains, consisting of the entrance arch and the two towers, which were cut off in the 18th century, were demolished in the early 1960s with the urban restructuring of the entire neighborhood.

"The Porta Aurea, which gave its name to the sestiere of Portoria, was and is nevertheless, although reduced, on the plane called Piccapietra, because it was a locality inhabited by stone workers, stonemasons, sailors, etc. The gateway was so named because there, from S. Matteo, came the property of the Dorias; then from the activity exercised by many of the inhabitants it was also called the Piccapietra. It did not have the monumental forms of those of S. Andrea and the Vacca, although it belonged to the same ring of walls; but it was defended by two towers that still existed in 1723."

— Federico Donaver, "Vie di Genova", 1912

=== Territory ===
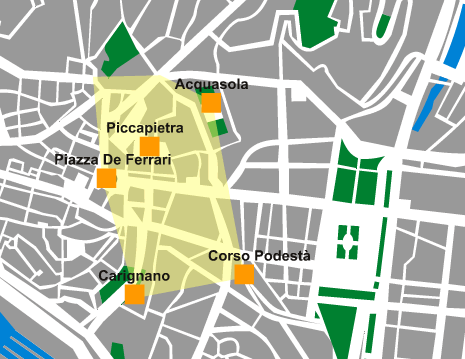
Map of the Portoria sestiere (including the Carignano area)

Historically, the Portoria sestiere included the area between the Barbarossa walls and the sixteenth-century city wall, consisting of the Rivo Torbido valley and the Carignano hill. The Rivo Torbido is a short stream (since the 16th century entirely covered) that originates from the hill of Multedo (in the area of Piazza Manin, in the Castelletto district) and flows into the sea in the so-called "seno di Giano" (now buried and included in the port area), flowing below Via Palestro, Piazza Corvetto, Via V Dicembre, Piazza Dante and Via Madre di Dio.

With the constitution of the districts, in the 20th century, the district of Portoria was merged with that of San Vincenzo, another historic city district, creating the district of "Portoria," subdivided into the "urban units" of "San Vincenzo" and "Carignano," both of which are now included in the Municipio I Centro Est.

The Portoria area proper comprises an irregular quadrilateral with Piazza Corvetto, Piazza De Ferrari, Piazza Dante and the Monumental Bridge at its vertices. It is bordered to the west by the Molo and Maddalena districts, to the east by San Vincenzo, to the north by Castelletto, and to the south by Carignano.

== Demographics ==
The territory of the former Portoria district had a population of 12,514 as of December 31, 2017, of which 5,262 were in the "urban unit" of San Vincenzo alone, which as mentioned also includes the heart of the former Portoria district.

Available historical data concern the former Portoria district as a whole, with the two urban units of San Vincenzo and Carignano. The demographic history of the former district is affected by the urbanistic vicissitudes of the area. The population, 35,877 at the first census in 1861, rose to 40,260 in 1901, a figure representing the "historical maximum." Since then, with the transformation of these former working-class neighborhoods into an area designated for business centers and tertiary activities, a conspicuous population decline began. The population, still 35,007 in 1936, declined to 20,021 in 1961 and 12,514 in 2017, of which 5,262, as already mentioned, were in the San Vincenzo urban unit alone.

== History ==
Commonly today the name of Portoria refers to the neighborhood of Piccapietra, in the heart of the modern city, but its history is ancient: before wartime destruction and, above all, building speculation wiped out the old artisans' houses, caruggi and small squares, uprooting its population, it was a kind of socio-linguistic enclave.

The history of the neighborhood from the 14th to the 18th century gravitated around the many corporations that had their headquarters in the historic cores, outside the city walls, that had sprung up in the Middle Ages on ecclesiastical land holdings. Another important landmark of the neighborhood were the two hospital complexes of Pammatone and Incurabili, active from the late 15th century until the early decades of the 20th century.

Urban planning operations in the last century have systematically destroyed the pre-existing urban and social fabric, leading to the almost total disappearance of the historic nuclei of Piccapietra, Ponticello and Borgo Lanaioli, of which little fragmentary evidence remains in the present district of mainly business and commercial use.

=== Origins ===
Much of the area of today's Portoria district, in pre-Roman times (6th to 3rd centuries B.C.) was occupied by a vast necropolis that stretched from the Piano di Sant'Andrea to the hill of the same name and to the area where the church of St. Stephen would later be built. The remains of these burials came to light during work on the construction of Via XX Settembre. The tombs, similar to Etruscan tombs, testify to the Etruscan presence guarding the port inlet, located along the route to Marseille, around which the primitive settlement had formed.

On this area, which remained outside the first city walls, first emerged (9th century) the Abbey of St. Stephen, to which a vast landed property owned by the Benedictine monks of the Abbey of San Colombano of Bobbio belonged; the first houses were built in the middle of the 12th century when the town was provided with a new ring of walls, known as the Barbarossa walls, of which the Soprana and Aurea gates were part; in the 14th century some nuclei of houses were built to accommodate the artisan classes; in the same period a new ring of walls encompassed these settlements as well. These urban cores from the late Middle Ages until the eighteenth century were home to numerous corporations, among which emerged that of the Dyers, after whom an alley in the old quarter was also named, which disappeared with the demolitions of the twentieth century.

This is how Giustiniani, a bishop and historian, described the area in his "Annals" in the early sixteenth century:

In this parish of the city there are seven hundred and forty houses, almost all of them belonging to the common people, as if in ancient times this region had been a suburb outside the city. And in a district called Richeme, there is the monastery of the Annunciation of the Observant Friars Minor, a very solemn thing. And adjoining the monastery is a great hospital, ample and large, in which there are more than one hundred and thirty beds; and where the sick are well cared for.
And in the street called Portoria there is a small hospital built in our time for the incurably ill; and besides the fact that the building is large and beautiful, the order of the service is so beautiful that people from Rome and from many other principal cities have come to take notes from this little hospital; and the Genoese themselves have gone to Rome to administer such a place.

— Agostino Giustiniani, "Annals of the Republic of Genoa", 1537

In the seventeenth century, Strada Giulia was opened in the district, widening the previous "Strada Felice" and creating the first vehicular connection between the center of Genoa and the lower Val Bisagno. The opening of this road, seven meters wide, an exceptional measure for those times, necessitated the demolition of numerous buildings. Tracing the route of this road, Via XX Settembre would be built at the end of the 19th century.

In 1684 the primitive 15th-century neighborhood was almost completely destroyed by French naval bombardment and shortly rebuilt with state assistance.

=== The hospitals of Portoria ===
Between the 15th and 16th centuries the two hospitals mentioned by Giustiniani, now disappeared, were built in the Portoria area and were the main point of reference for urban health care for several centuries. At that time, in various Italian cities numerous wealthy people, moved by religious faith or simply by the desire to contribute to the good of the city, donated part of their wealth for interventions in favor of the neediest people. These charitable initiatives sought to intervene within the limits of the possibilities of the time to alleviate situations of infirmity caused by the difficult living conditions of the poor, who constituted the majority of the population. In the wake of this tradition are the figures of Bartolomeo Bosco and Ettore Vernazza, founders of the Pammatone and "degli Incurabili" hospitals, respectively.

==== Hospital of Pammatone ====
Pammatone Hospital, for nearly five centuries the city's main hospital, was founded in 1422 by Bartolomeo Bosco. From 1471, by the will of the Senate of the Republic, it was destined to replace the many small hospitals scattered around the city.

Between 1478 and 1510 Catherine of Genoa lived at the hospital, devoting herself to the care of the sick and the administration of the facility, of which she was also the director.

The hospital was enlarged in 1758 with the contribution of numerous benefactors, and in particular of the noblewoman Anna Maria Pallavicini, who with a bequest of 125,000 Genoese liras allowed the work to begin.

At the beginning of the 20th century, activities and functions were transferred to the new San Martino Hospital, and the old Pammatone building became home to the Faculty of Economics and Business of the University of Genoa. Almost completely destroyed by bombing in World War II, what remained of the complex was demolished in the 1960s; the new courthouse was built on the site of the 18th-century building, which preserves the colonnaded courtyard, the monumental staircase of the old hospital and some statues of benefactors inside.

==== Hospital of the Incurables ====
The "Ospedale degli Incurabili" or "dei Cronici," popularly called "Spedaletto," was founded by Ettore Vernazza in 1499; for four centuries it was Genoa's most important institution for the care of the chronically and mentally ill.

Initially designed to take in patients with syphilis, a sexually transmitted disease that had begun to spread in Europe in those very years, in the decades following its foundation epileptics and the mentally ill were also admitted there.

The large complex, into which the 13th-century church of St. Columbanus and the adjoining convent were also incorporated, functioned until the 1920s, when activities and furnishings were transferred to the new St. Martin's Hospital, but by 1841 most of the psychiatric patients had already been transferred to the new asylum built in the San Vincenzo area.

Half-destroyed by bombs in World War II, what remained of the complex was demolished in the 1960s, when the modern business and commercial district of Piccapietra was built.

=== Balilla revolt in Portoria ===
Historical antagonists

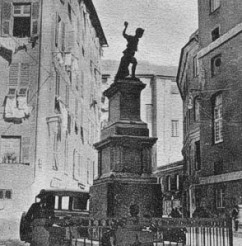
La statua di Balilla in una foto d'epoca

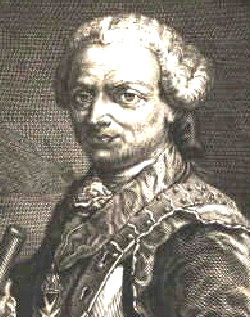
Antoniotto Botta Adorno

Left: Balilla's statue in a period photo.
Right: A. Botta Adorno

Old Portoria is known for the uprising of the Genoese against the Austro-Piedmontese army, which occupied the city under the control of Minister Plenipotentiary Antoniotto Botta Adorno, on December 5, 1746. The initiator of the uprising was a young boy, a century later identified as Giovan Battista Perasso, known as Balilla. The episode is set in the context of the War of the Austrian Succession, in which the Republic of Genoa found itself involved alongside the French and Spanish against the Duchy of Savoy and Austria.

In September 1746 the Austrians under General Botta Adorno had occupied the city. On December 5, a squadron of Austrian soldiers was found crossing the streets of the district dragging a heavy mortar into the street of Portoria that was to be moved from the heights of Carignano to another strategic point for the control of the city.

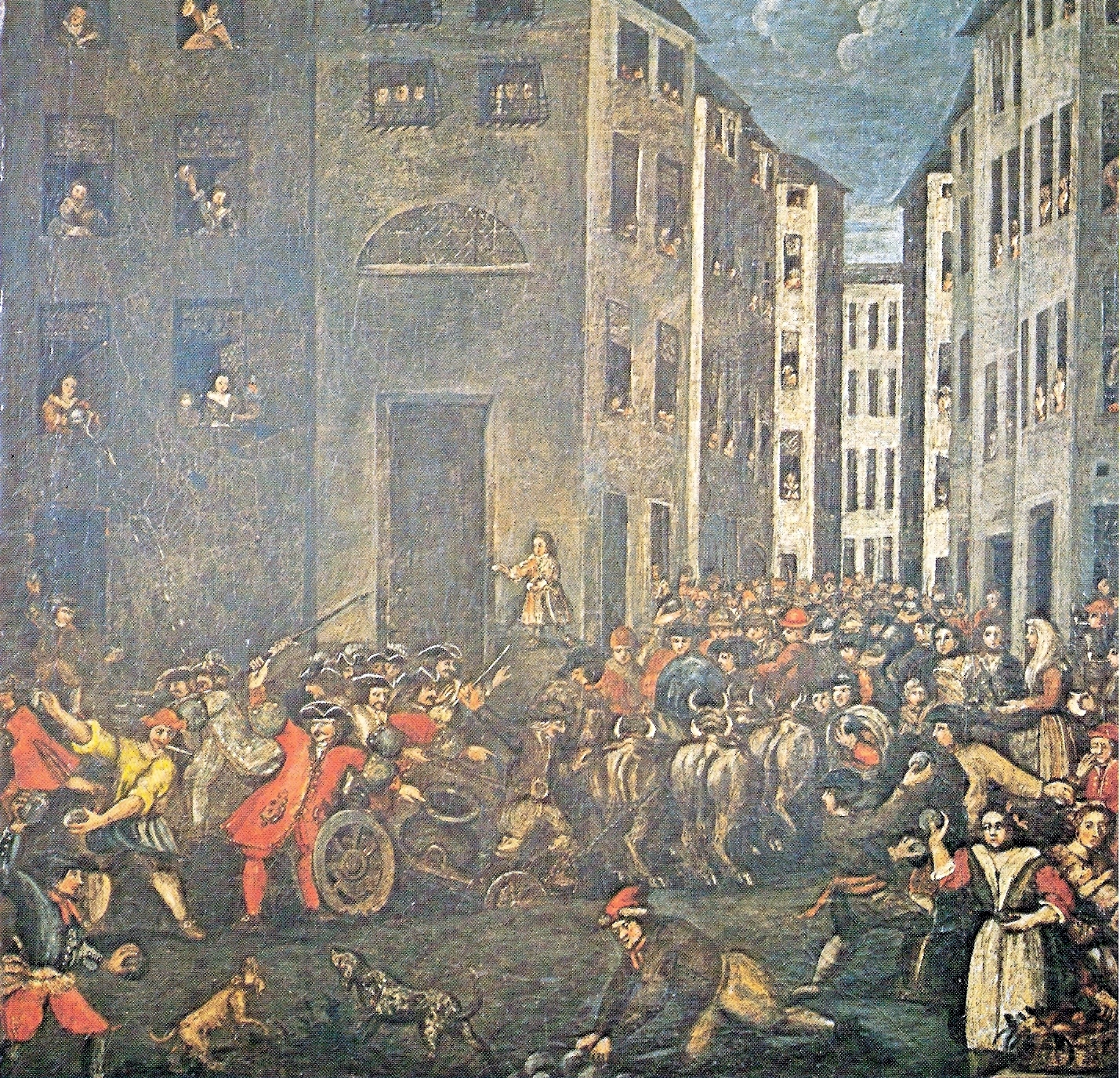
The revolt in Portoria against the Austrians in a painting by Giuseppe Comotto. Balilla is depicted in the center.

The road, perhaps muddy from the rain, sank under the weight of the mortar, and the soldiers asked the locals for help, swearing at them in a bad way; when a sergeant raised a stick against a man to make him obey, the revolt began.

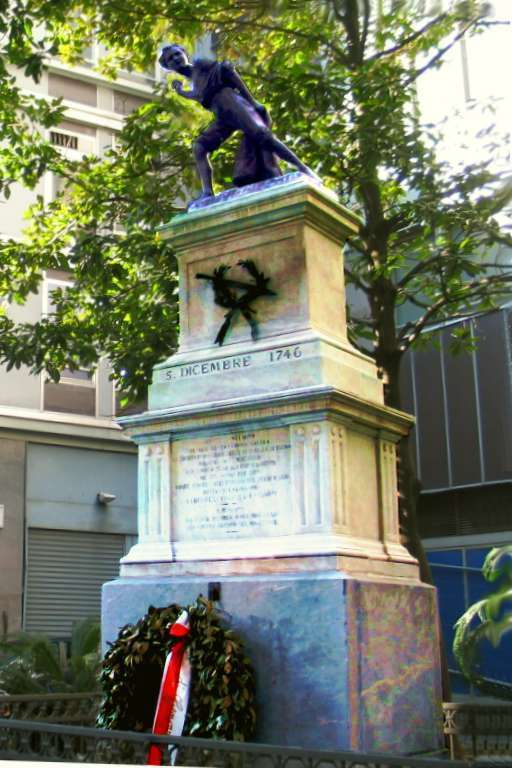
The monument in its current state

Shouting "Che l'inse?" (i.e., "Shall I start?"), a boy threw the first stone, followed by a shower of cobblestones hurled at the soldiers, who were forced to abandon the mortar and flee.

A marble plaque, simply bearing the date December 5, 1746, which survived the urbanistic vicissitudes that led to the destruction of the neighborhood, and is now placed in the center of the roadway at the intersection of Via V Dicembre (the old Portoria street, now renamed in memory of the historic day), Via E. Vernazza and Via delle Casacce, indicates the place where this event occurred.

A bronze statue depicting Balilla, the work of Vincenzo Giani (1831-1900), was placed in 1862 at the place where the famous episode supposedly took place, near Pammatone Hospital. In the 1960s, with the demolition of the old quarter, the statue was moved to Palazzo Tursi; after restoration work, in 2001 it was rearranged in its original location, in front of the Palace of Justice, albeit in a completely changed urban context.

Although it is historically established that the initiator of the revolt had been a boy, there is no historical confirmation of his identity. The very young hero of the uprising more than a century later was identified by some as Giovan Battista Perasso, a boy from the neighborhood, born in 1735; according to others, it was instead a young man of the same name from Montoggio, in the Genoese hinterland, born in 1729, but there are no documents attesting to either of these identities, as stated in 1927 by the Società Ligure di Storia Patria, reiterating what had already been expressed by Neri and Donaver at the end of the nineteenth century.

"In fact no document proves who was the initiator of that memorable uprising, and therefore I will say along with Neri, that the monument of Portoria instead of an individual hero represents the generous daring of a people who, having reached the height of oppression, broke their chains and claimed their freedom."

— (Federico Donaver, "History of Genoa," 1890)

=== The Nineteenth Century ===
This is how Casalis describes the sestiere of Portoria shortly before the middle of the 19th century:

"Sestiere of Portoria: bordered with the ring of the old walls on the east and south: on the other parts with the sestieri of the Molo and Maddalena. It contains the two collegiate churches of Carignano and Rimedio; the abbey of Fieschi; four parishes, s. Stefano, s. Giacomo, s. Andrea and SS. Salvatore; the Spedale grande, the Spedale degl'incurabili; the conservatory of s. Giuseppe and that of s. Bernardo in Carignano. The religious houses are, that of the PP. gesuiti in s. Ambrogio; that of the PP. ministers of the sick, and a third of the servites. There are three monasteries of nuns, St. Sebastian's, the Capuchins and those of Jesus Crucified.

Nor shall we forget ... the Acquasola promenade. The prisons are on the premises of St. Andrew's. The main streets are: via Giulia; via s. Giuseppe, leveled after 1816, called the devil's crêuza; via di Portoria, famous in the war of 1746; salita di s. Catterina, adorned with noble buildings, enlarged, flattened, remodeled several times after 1816, and lately paved (1840) with excellent expediency, via di s. Ambrogio, which has humble houses on one side, straight street from the plane of s. Andrea up to Ponticello, and then up to the gate of s. Stefano.

It is usually included in the Portoria Sestiere the Academy of Fine Arts and the great Carlo Felice Theater.

This sestiere had 31,000 inhabitants in 1837."

— (Goffredo Casalis, "Dizionario geografico, storico, statistico e commerciale degli stati di S.M. il Re di Sardegna," vol VII, 1840)

At this time Portoria was still a working-class neighborhood on the fringes of the historic city, but starting in the middle of the century, with the implementation of the plan prepared by architect Carlo Barabino in 1825, aimed at extending the city eastward by overcoming the limits of the medieval city, a real urban revolution began that in little more than a century would completely change the layout of the area, transforming the old workers' and artisans' neighborhood into a business and commercial center.

==== The urban expansion of the late 19th century ====
The first interventions, conducted around 1840 by G.B. Resasco, Barabino's successor in the role of civic architect, concerned the San Vincenzo area. The first intervention in the Portoria area, around 1870, was the opening of Via Roma and Piazza Corvetto to create a link between the city center and the new residential neighborhoods that had sprung up a few years earlier in the Castelletto area, but a real turning point came towards the end of the century, with the construction of Via XX Settembre, still the main axis of the urban road system today.

The street, built by rectifying and widening the existing Via Giulia (in the Portoria district), Via della Consolazione and Via Porta Pila (in the S. Vincenzo district), was characterized from the beginning by Art Nouveau architecture; among the architects who participated in the various designs was the Florentine Gino Coppedè. Almost all the buildings on both sides of the old Via Giulia were demolished to build the street.

=== The twentieth century ===
Historical buildings that have disappeared

The implementation of the various urban restructuring plans resulted in the disappearance, in addition to many houses, of numerous historic buildings, both civil and religious.

Already in the 1870s, with the opening of Via Roma and the parallel Galleria Mazzini, were demolished the 16th-century church of San Sebastiano with the adjoining convent, the conservatory of the Daughters of St. Joseph, founded by Ettore Vernazza in the 16th century, with the church of the same name, built in 1606, the oratory of S. Giacomo delle Fucine and a section of the historic city aqueduct, including the canal-bridge that crossed Salita S. Caterina. The opening of Via XX Settembre and the subsequent enlargement of Piazza De Ferrari resulted in the disappearance of the 18th-century church of the Rimedio, the church and former convent of S. Andrea, which was turned into a prison, and the entire section of the Barbarossa walls between Porta Soprana and Porta Aurea.

With the 1931 plan, by which the entire hamlet of Ponticello was demolished, of the two mansions on either side of "vico dritto Ponticello," only the Colombo house was spared.

In the 1960s, with the creation of the business center of Piccapietra, in addition to the old borough, the two historic hospitals of Pammatone and Incurabili, now reduced to ruins by the war, the church of St. Columba (included in the Incurabili complex), the Porta Aurea, which had given its name to the neighborhood, and the Casacce oratories of St. Andrew and St. Bartholomew were demolished.

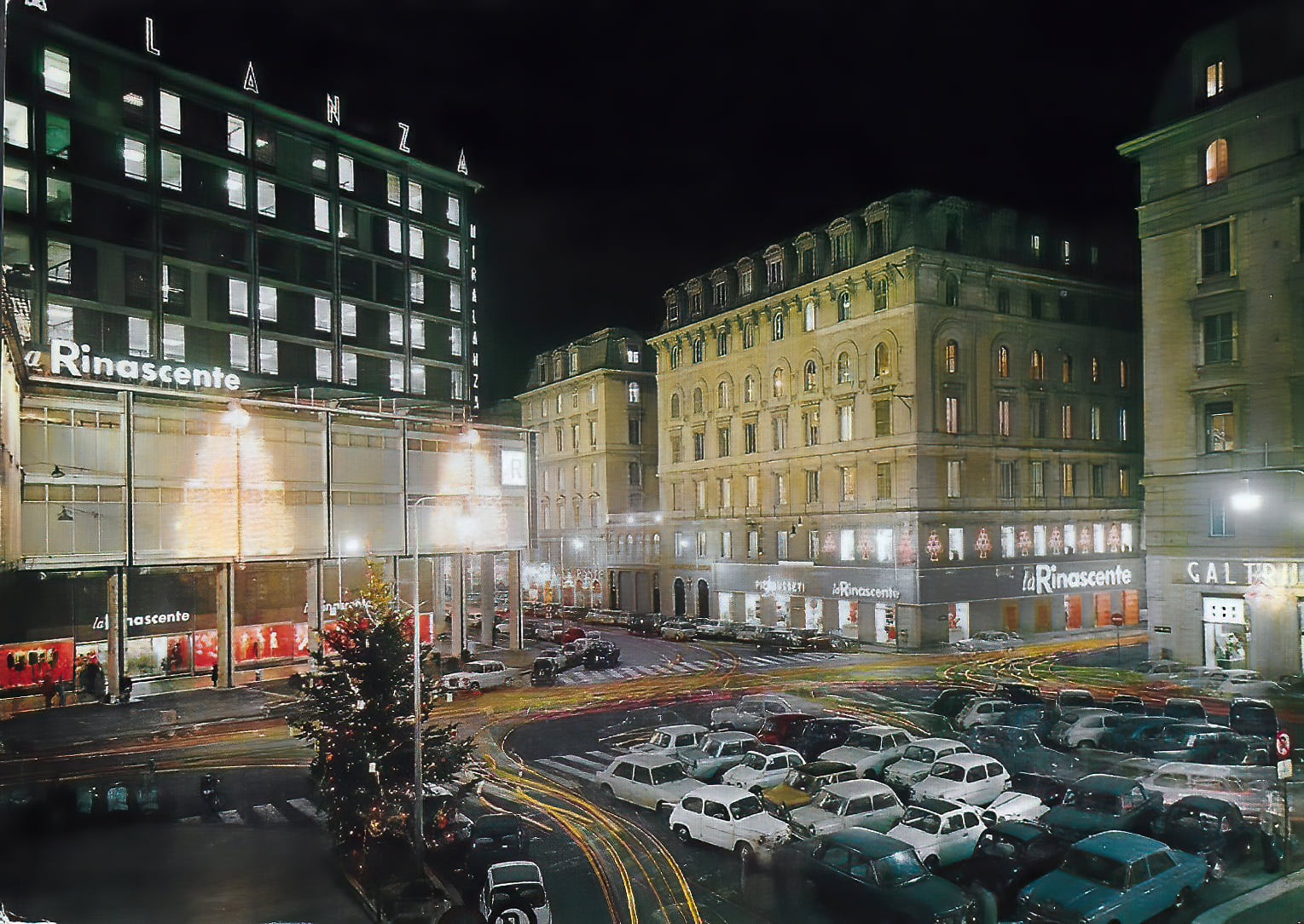
Largo XII Ottobre, at the intersection with Via Ettore Vernazza and Via Sofia Lomellini in 1968

The main events that characterized the neighborhood in the century that was beginning are mainly related to urban redevelopment; with the systematic application of successive urban plans, within a few decades, a few monumental buildings remained of what had been for centuries a working-class suburb, especially churches of historical importance, surrounded by modern buildings, with architectural styles differentiated according to the different periods: ranging from the Art Nouveau buildings of Via XX Settembre, to the rationalist-style skyscrapers of Piazza Dante, to the modern glass and concrete structures of Piccapietra.

- In the early years of the new century, in order to complete Via XX Settembre and widen Piazza De Ferrari, the hill of Morcento, also known as the hill of S. Andrea, named after the former convent of the Benedictine nuns of S. Andrea della Porta, which stood at its summit and had been turned into a prison in 1817, was leveled. On the area of the hill, Via Dante was built (1904) with the buildings facing it, including the New Stock Exchange building.
- During the period of Fascism, the "Plan of the Central Areas" (1931) affected the Ponticello area: with the demolition of the old quarter, the palaces of Vico dritto Ponticello, leaning against the Porta Soprana, disappeared, and Piazza Dante and the neighboring streets were built, where two skyscrapers were built, one of which, the Piacentini Tower, with its 108 m was for many years the tallest building in Europe.
- After the war, the "Piccapietra Detailed Plan" (1959) affected the heart of ancient Portoria, with the demolition of the two old hospitals, long since disused and reduced to ruins by the bombings. In place of the old houses rose Piccapietra Square (named after the ancient district inhabited by stonemasons) and Via XII Ottobre was opened.
- The last intervention, carried out starting in 1966, affected the area of Via Madre di Dio and led to the total disappearance of Borgo Lanaioli (an area now included in the Carignano urban planning unit).

The theme of the demolitions of the old neighborhood was at the time a source of inspiration for several Genoese songwriters who recount the nostalgia for a popular world that was disappearing along with the old houses, replaced by cold modern architecture; very popular became lyrics such as Piccon dagghe cianin, a song much loved by the Genoese, best known in the interpretation of I Trilli and also recorded by the Ricchi e Poveri in 1977.

These lyrics are an expression of a widespread feeling, which saw in the radical urban redevelopment of the area not only the destruction of old houses and historic buildings, but the disintegration of an established social fabric. Even today, many years later, it is not uncommon for the terms havoc and speculation to be used to define these urbanistic operations, although a perhaps inevitable consequence of the city's expansion that began in the late nineteenth century.

== Monuments and places of interest ==
=== Squares, streets and public spaces ===
The Portoria district includes some of Genoa's main streets and squares.

==== Piazza De Ferrari ====
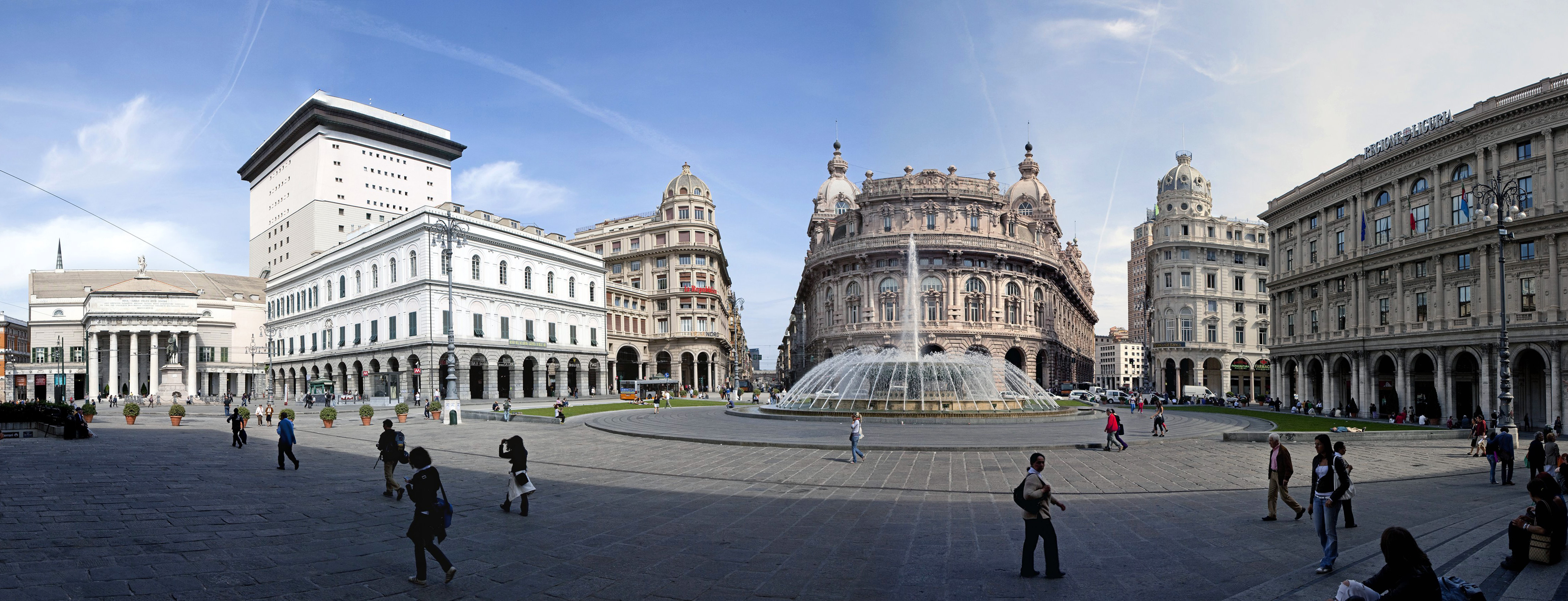
180º view of De Ferrari square

De Ferrari Square, named after the Duke of Galliera Raffaele De Ferrari, is Genoa's main square and the center of the modern city. It consists of two adjoining areas: one, smaller, in front of the Carlo Felice theater, corresponding roughly to the old S. Domenico square, which can be seen today in its arrangement from the 1820s, when the church of S. Domenico to build the theater and the palace of the Ligustic Academy of Fine Arts; the second and much larger area, quadrangular in shape and surrounded by buildings in the eclectic style, was created by earthworks and demolitions in the late nineteenth and early twentieth centuries, when the major arteries that converge there were opened, making it the main road junction of the modern city. In the center of the square since 1936 is the large bronze fountain, designed by Giuseppe Crosa di Vergagni.

Now almost completely pedestrianized, it underwent a restyling in the 1990s, mainly involving the street pavement, the fountain and the facade of the Doge's Palace. Overlooking it are the Carlo Felice Theater, with its neoclassical pronaos designed by architect Carlo Barabino, and a number of historic palaces, headquarters of companies and public institutions. Starting from the Doge's Palace, in a counterclockwise direction one finds:

- The Palazzo della Regione Liguria, formerly the Palazzo della Società Italia di Navigazione (Cesare Gamba, built between 1912 and 1923).
- The Palazzo del Credito Italiano (Giuseppe Tallero, 1914), at the corner of Dante and Petrarca streets.
- The Palazzo della Nuova Borsa, built between 1907 and 1912, designed by Dario Carbone, at the corner of Via XX Settembre and Via Dante.
- The Palace of the Ligustic Academy of Fine Arts, built between 1827 and 1831 to a design by Carlo Barabino.
- The Carlo Felice Theater (designed by Carlo Barabino), built in 1928, with its neoclassical pronaos. Only Barabino's neoclassical pronaos is preserved from the original building.

The northwestern side, which corresponds to the old Piazza San Domenico and substantially presents the appearance desired by Barabino, forms an indentation with the equestrian monument to Giuseppe Garibaldi, by the sculptor Augusto Rivalta (1893), in the center, overlooked by the theater, the palace of the Accademia Ligustica, and, on the opposite side, two palaces aligned with the Palazzo Ducale, the oldest of those in the square, although remodeled in the 19th century:

- Palazzo Doria De Fornari, built in medieval times for the Doria family, was renovated between the sixteenth and seventeenth centuries and then again, notably in the nineteenth century, when it was also home to a luxury hotel.
- The Palazzo Agostino Spinola, created in the 18th century from the union of three separate buildings dating from the late 16th century. The facade, crowned by eight allegorical statues flanking the coat of arms of the Brignole Sale De Ferrari family, was redone in 1830 in the Neoclassical style, probably by Barabino.
- Palazzo Giulio Pallavicini, also derived from the amalgamation already in late medieval times of two buildings belonging to the Doria family, stands next to the Palazzo Ducale, from which it is divided by Salita del Fondaco.

==== Piazza Corvetto ====
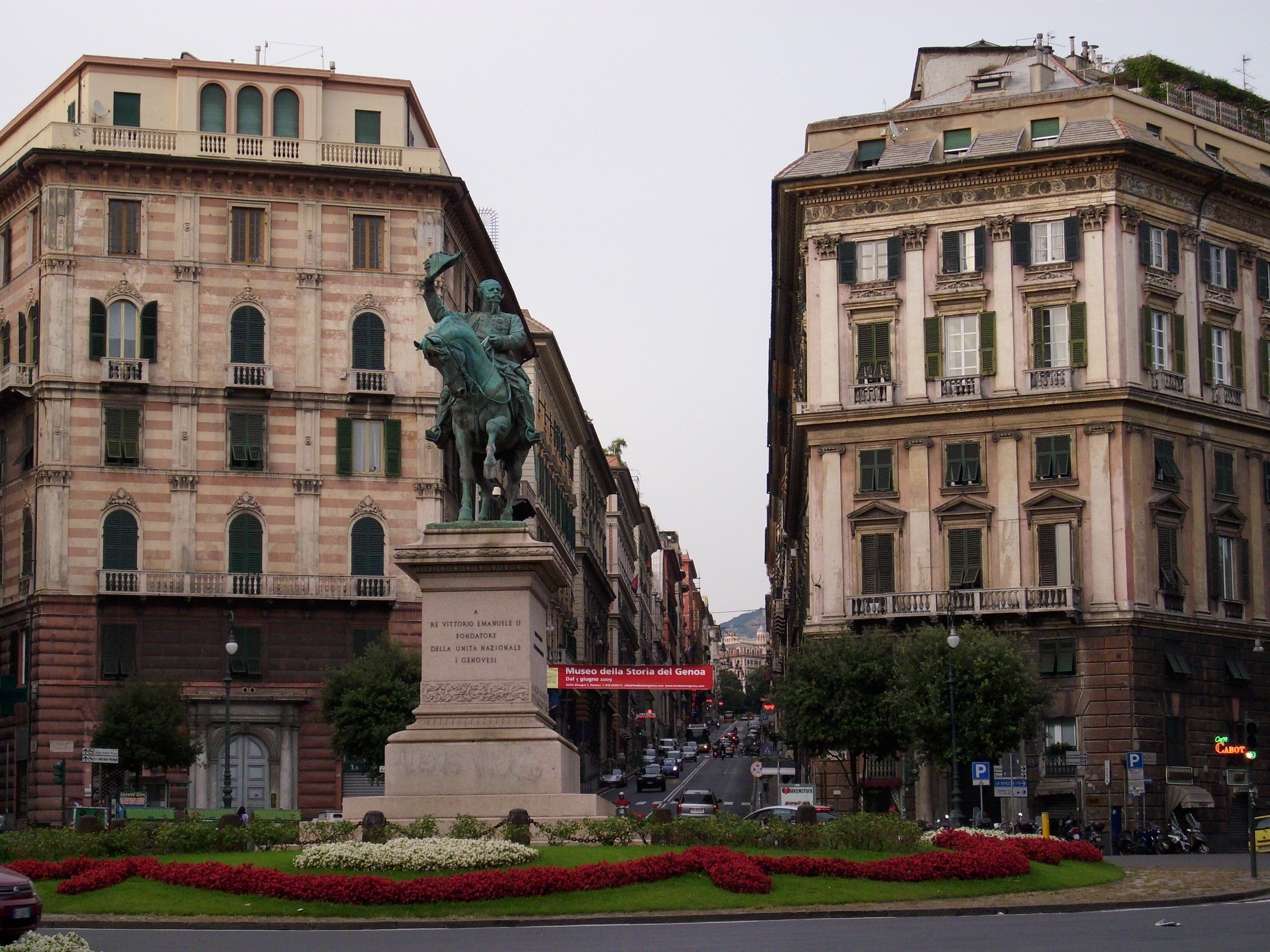
Piazza Corvetto with the monument to Victor Emmanuel II

Circular in shape, it was built in 1877 to create a link between the streets of the new residential neighborhoods that sprang up on the heights of Castelletto and the city center. The square, into which seven streets converge, is named after the politician and jurist Luigi Emanuele Corvetto. Initially affected only by local traffic, with the opening of the Nino Bixio tunnel, built in 1928, which connects it with Portello Square, it became one of the main junctions for traffic flows between the west, east and city center, but nevertheless it has retained its original elegance. In the center of the traffic circle has stood since 1886 the equestrian monument to Victor Emmanuel II of Savoy, the work of Francesco Barzaghi. Upstream, the Villetta Di Negro park forms a backdrop to the square.

The square was built where once was a deep depression where the stream known as Rivotorbido flowed, now channeled below the square. Here stood the Acquasola gate, which was part of the Barbarossa walls (1155), later also included in the fourteenth-century wall. The gate, already modified in 1825, was demolished in 1877 to build the square, along with the promenade that joined Villetta Di Negro to the Acquasola esplanade, designed by Carlo Barabino only fifty years earlier.

==== Piazza Dante and Via Dante ====
The square was created in the 1930s on the area obtained from the demolition of the old Ponticello district. An important road junction, on one side it connects through the street of the same name, Via Dante, to Piazza De Ferrari, while at the other end is the Cristoforo Colombo tunnel, opened in 1937, which connects the city center to the Foce area; the square is characterized by the strong contrast between the imposing architecture in the rationalist style (including the two skyscrapers: the Piacentini Tower and the Dante due tower) and the surviving medieval monuments: the Porta Soprana, the Columbus house, and the cloister of the disappeared convent of S. Andrew, which stood not far away.

In the adjoining Via Dante, opened after the excavation of the hill of S. Andrea in the first decade of the twentieth century, stand the buildings of the Post Office and Telegraphs (Dario Carbone, 1914) and the Bank of Italy (Luigi de Gaetani, 1915), and on the corner with Piazza De Ferrari, those of the New Stock Exchange and the Italian Credit.

==== Piazza Piccapietra ====
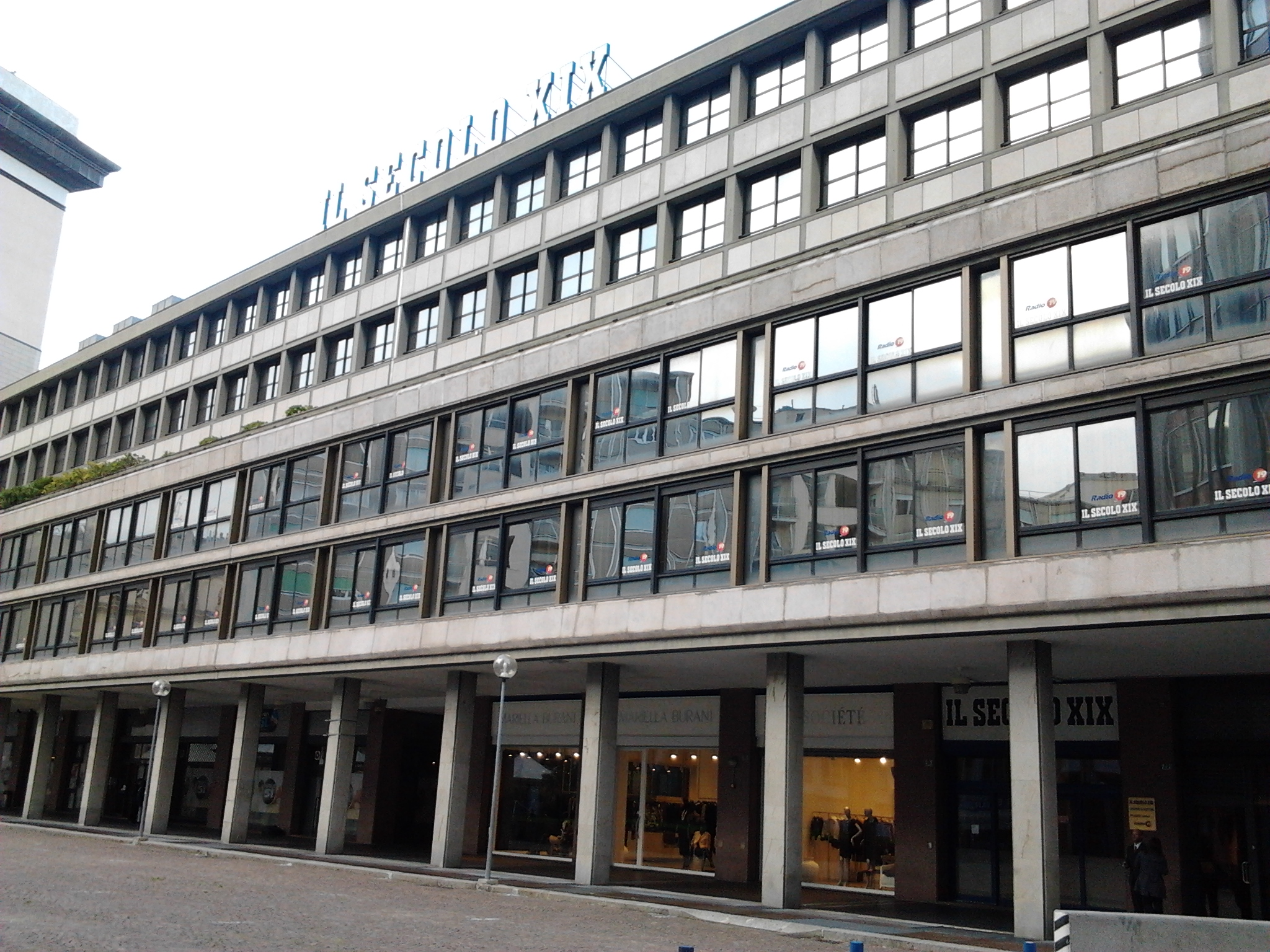
Secolo XIX headquarters in Piazza Piccapietra

While the three main squares located on the perimeter of the district constitute important road junctions, this space created in the 1960s in what had been the center of the ancient suburb of Piccapietra is instead a pedestrian area with no vehicular outlets. It partly occupies the area of a section of the Barbarossa walls and the Aurea gate; triangular in shape, it is located on the roof of the parking lot of the same name and is surrounded by glass and concrete arcade buildings used as business centers, including the headquarters of Costa Cruises and that of the newspaper Il Secolo XIX, which has occupied what had been the offices of Italimpianti since 1999. Despite being a pedestrian area, it has never become a meeting place and is frequented only as a transit route to reach the various buildings; it becomes busy only in December when it hosts the popular St. Nicholas Christmas market.

==== Via XX Settembre ====
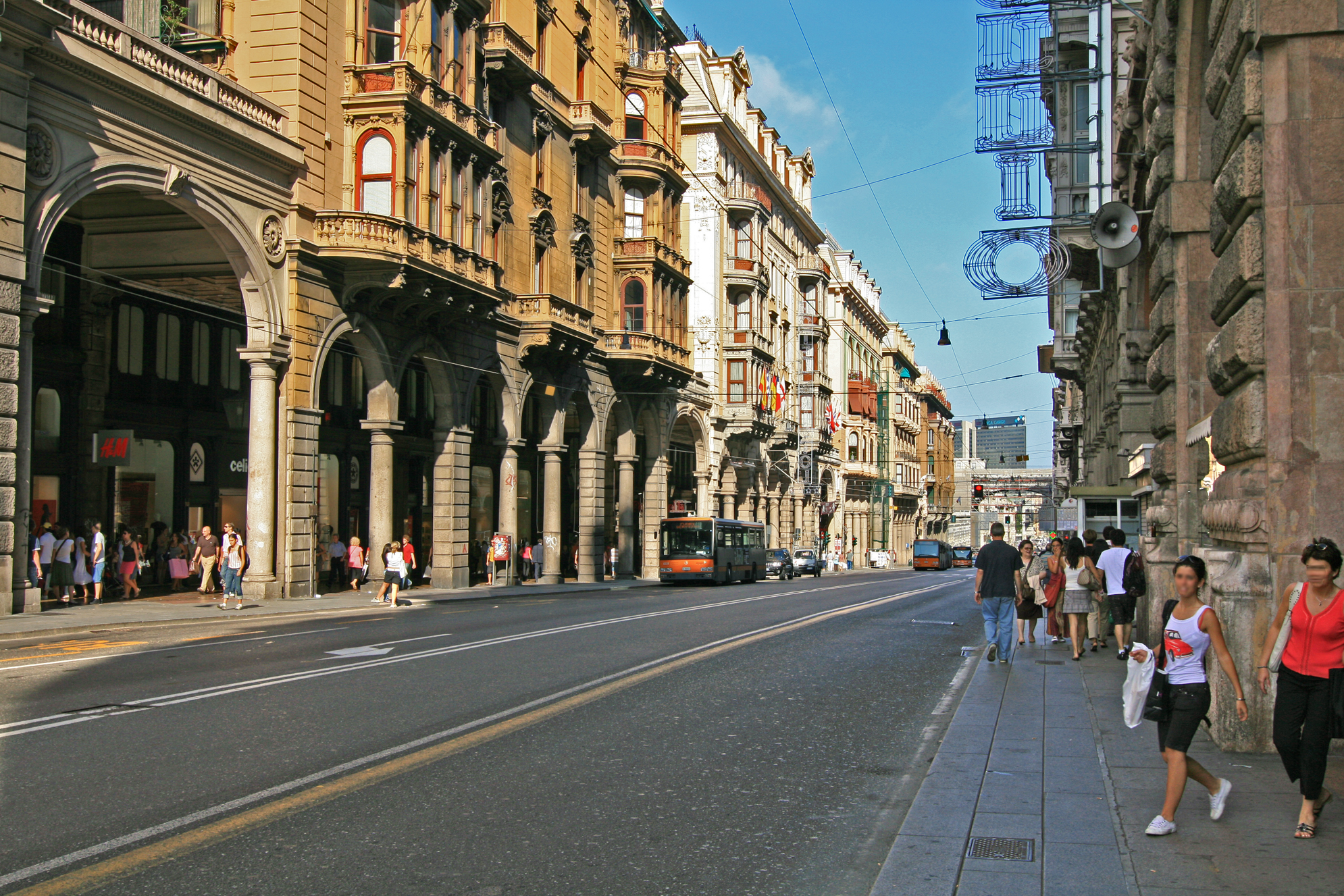
A glimpse of Via XX Settembre

It was built in the last decade of the nineteenth century, rectifying and widening the route of Via Giulia and Via della Consolazione, to create a new road axis towards the east, which had become necessary due to the increased volume of traffic, a consequence of the city's expansion outside the ancient city walls.

The competition for the construction of the new road was announced in 1883, after an almost 20-year debate, and it was not until 1887 that Cesare Gamba's design was approved. Work began in 1892. In 1896 the lower part, corresponding to the former Via della Consolazione in the San Vincenzo district, was inaugurated, while the work on the upstream part (the old Via Giulia) was carried out between 1898 and 1900. All pre-existing buildings in Via Giulia were demolished and replaced by new buildings, constructed for the first time in Genoa in reinforced concrete. Among the demolished buildings was the 18th-century church of N.S. del Rimedio, which was rebuilt in the same forms in Piazza Alimonda, in the Foce district. At the time of its opening, the street, wide, rectilinear and flanked by buildings of unusual height for the times and with high porticoes, represented a real novelty for the Genoese, who were accustomed to moving between narrow alleys. The naming of the new street was the subject of heated debate, until the desire of many citizens to see the historic date of the Capture of Rome recognized with this naming. The official opening took place on March 15, 1900, although the work was not yet fully completed, while the construction of the buildings facing the street would not be completed until 1913.

==== Via Roma ====
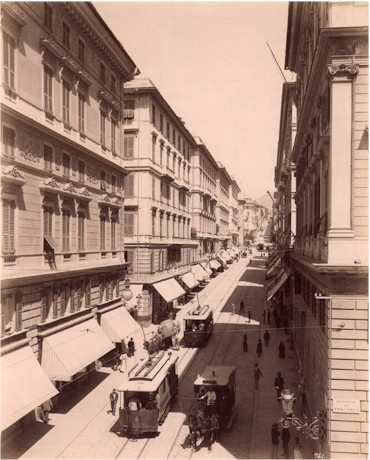
Nineteenth-century image of Via Roma, by Alfred Noack

The street, one of the city's most elegant streets, was built in the 1870s along with Piazza Corvetto as a link between the city center and the new residential areas that sprang up in those years on the Castelletto hill. The street, which is about 250 m long, in fact joins Piazza Corvetto to the final section of Via XXV Aprile, and then to Piazza De Ferrari, with a straight, slightly downhill course. It is overlooked by elegant nineteenth-century palaces destined for upper middle-class elites, with elevations inspired by sixteenth-century mannerist facades; the Orsini palace, at no. 8, has a hall frescoed by Nicolò Barabino. The buildings on the east side are joined together by arches leading to the parallel Galleria Mazzini. The street is home to elegant clothing stores and the historic Confetteria Pietro Romanengo fu Stefano, active in Genoa for more than two centuries. The construction work on the street and Galleria Mazzini resulted in the disappearance of several historic buildings: the church and convent of San Sebastiano, the church and conservatory of the Daughters of St. Joseph, the oratory of San Giacomo delle Fucine, and the bridge-canal of the medieval aqueduct that crossed the adjacent Salita Santa Caterina.

==== Via XII Ottobre ====
The street commemorating the day of the discovery of America (October 12, 1492) was built after World War II, when the Piccapietra neighborhood was demolished. Opened in the eastern slope of the Piccapietra hill, it connects Via XX Settembre to Piazza Corvetto with a slightly uphill course and two wide curves. The street passes by the church of San Camillo, the only remaining ancient building in the old neighborhood. The street is overlooked by modern buildings, including the former Rinascente building on the corner with Via E. Vernazza and upstream from the church the one, designed by Franco Albini, that overlaps Via Pammatone. In the flower beds adjacent to the street are a monument to Goffredo Mameli and a bust of partisan commander Aldo Gastaldi "Bisagno," (1921-1945).

==== Mazzini Gallery ====
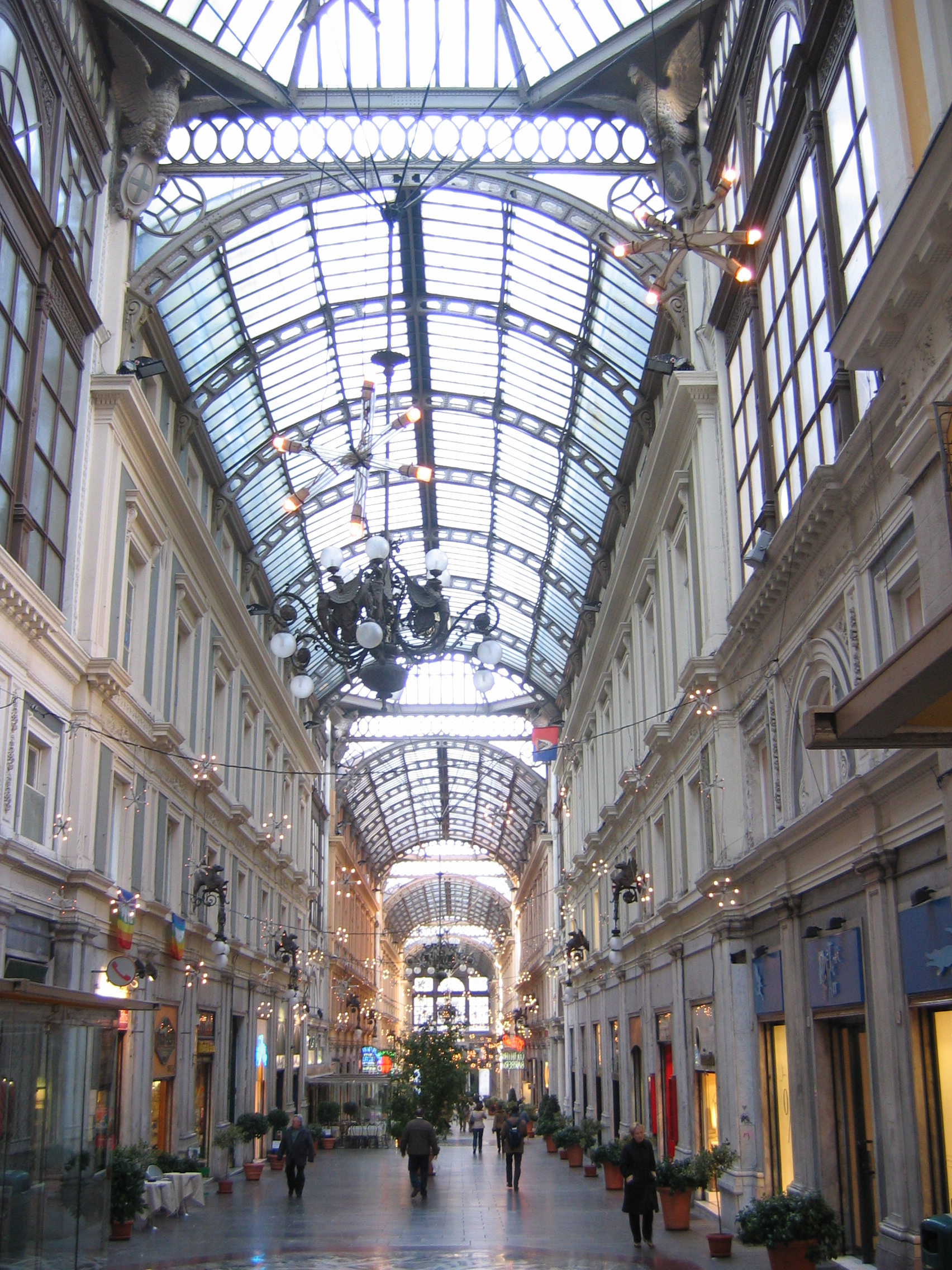
Mazzini Gallery

Named after patriot Giuseppe Mazzini, it was built between 1874 and 1876, with the earthworks of a part of the Piccapietra hill, at the same time as the parallel Via Roma; it is a pedestrian walkway covered by a metal structure with grandiose stained-glass windows and four bronze chandeliers, a typical example of the so-called cast-iron architecture in vogue at that time.

Its inauguration was experienced by the city as a great event; the gallery quickly became a meeting place for intellectuals and illustrious personalities, with its elegant establishments, including the "Caffè Roma," a hangout for writers, poets and journalists, and the "Libreria Editrice Moderna," which published many books by Genoese authors. Since 1926 it has been the site of the Book Fair, held in December and in spring (near the Easter season).

==== Acquasola esplanade ====
Stretching from Piazza Corvetto to the Monumental Bridge, Acquasola Park rests on part of the eponymous bastion, a strategic point of the 16th-century walls. Until the mid-16th century, this area was used as a deposit of debris from the construction of public works, and for this reason it was called i Müggi dell'Accaseua ("the piles of Acquasola"), a name still in use at the beginning of the 19th century. In the mid-sixteenth century various craft businesses were based in the area. In the 18th century the rampart, which had lost its strategic role with the construction of the Mura Nuove around 1630, was used as a public promenade, and a field for playing Genoese ball was built in the moat.

During the plague epidemic that struck Genoa in 1656-1657, many victims of the contagion were buried in mass graves in front of the rampart. Subsequently, the bone remains were exhumed and piled up in the basement of the bastion where they are still found today, a few meters below the road surface.

In 1825 on a design by Carlo Barabino the Acquasola promenade was built, in line with the urban beautification programs already planned in 1805 during Napoleonic rule. Barabino transformed the area immediately outside the walls into a wide panoramic terrace overlooking the Bisagno plain and the eastern hills, surrounded by trees arranged in regular rows and a lawn with a fountain in the center. Although inspired by the then-fashionable French model, Barabino did not simply use the walkway of the old walls to create a promenade, but built a new rampart on the fill of the moat to enlarge the area designated as a public garden. Two large arches replaced the old gate to extend the promenade to Villetta Di Negro, but they were demolished in 1877 with the opening of Piazza Corvetto.

After World War II, the park lost its importance in favor of other venues, but it still remains a green lung in the city center that is still quite frequented, although the currently usable area is degraded from its former glory and downsized because it is partly affected by a disputed subway parking project and a currently unbuilt subway station.

=== Civil architecture ===
==== Carlo Felice Theater ====
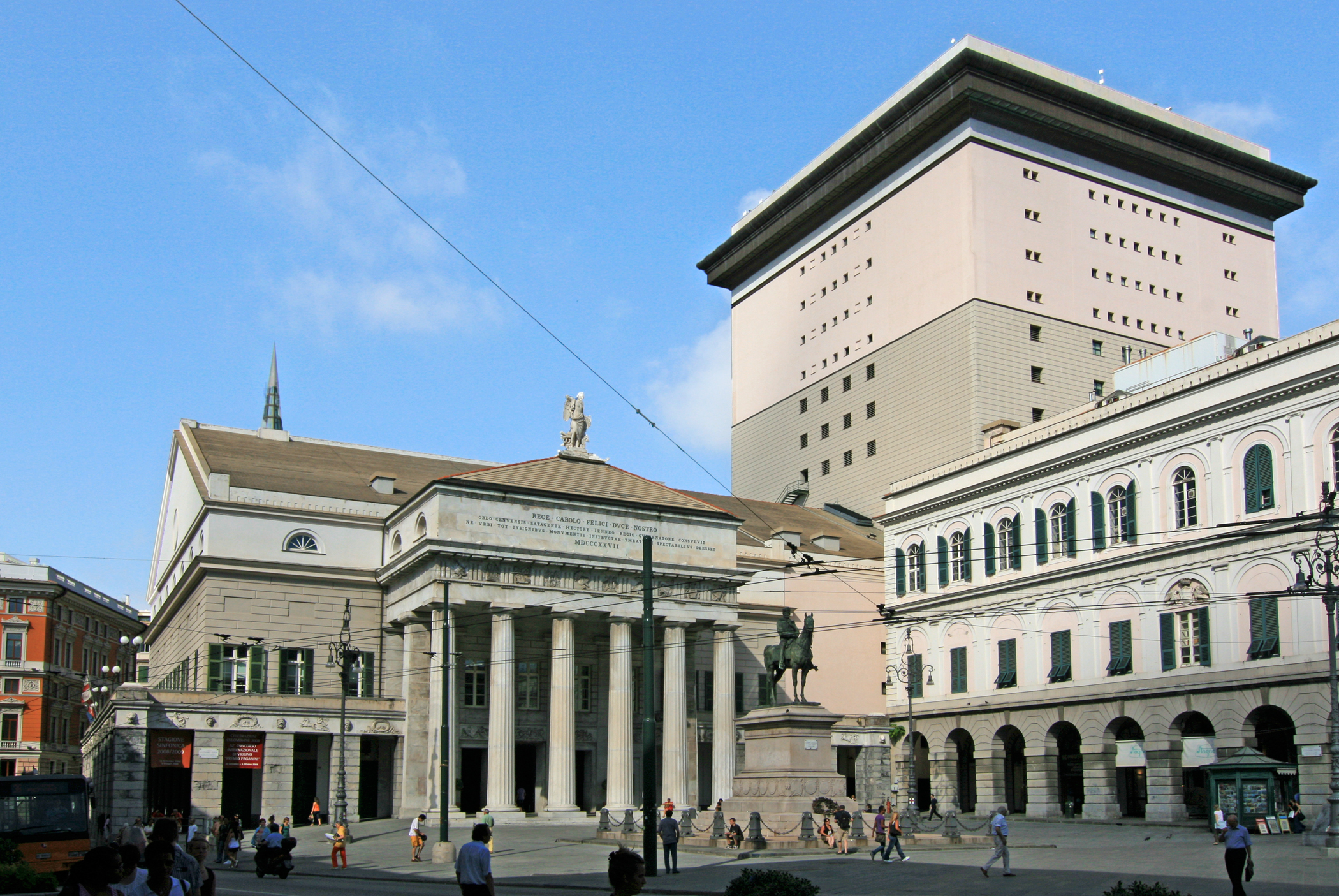
Carlo Felice Theater

The Carlo Felice Theater, named after the reigning sovereign at the time of its construction, is the city's main theater; strongly desired by the local authorities, it was built between 1826 and 1828 on the site of the demolished Church of San Domenico and inaugurated on April 7, 1828. The building, in neoclassical style by architect Carlo Barabino, faces Piazza De Ferrari with its columned pronaos, the only surviving element, together with the west portico, of the original construction, which was almost completely destroyed by bombing in World War II. Several plans for reconstruction were submitted after the war, but it was not until 1987, after a long and heated debate that a project, drawn up by Aldo Rossi in collaboration with Ignazio Gardella and others, was finally approved and work began. The reconstructed theater was inaugurated in 1991.

==== Columbus House ====
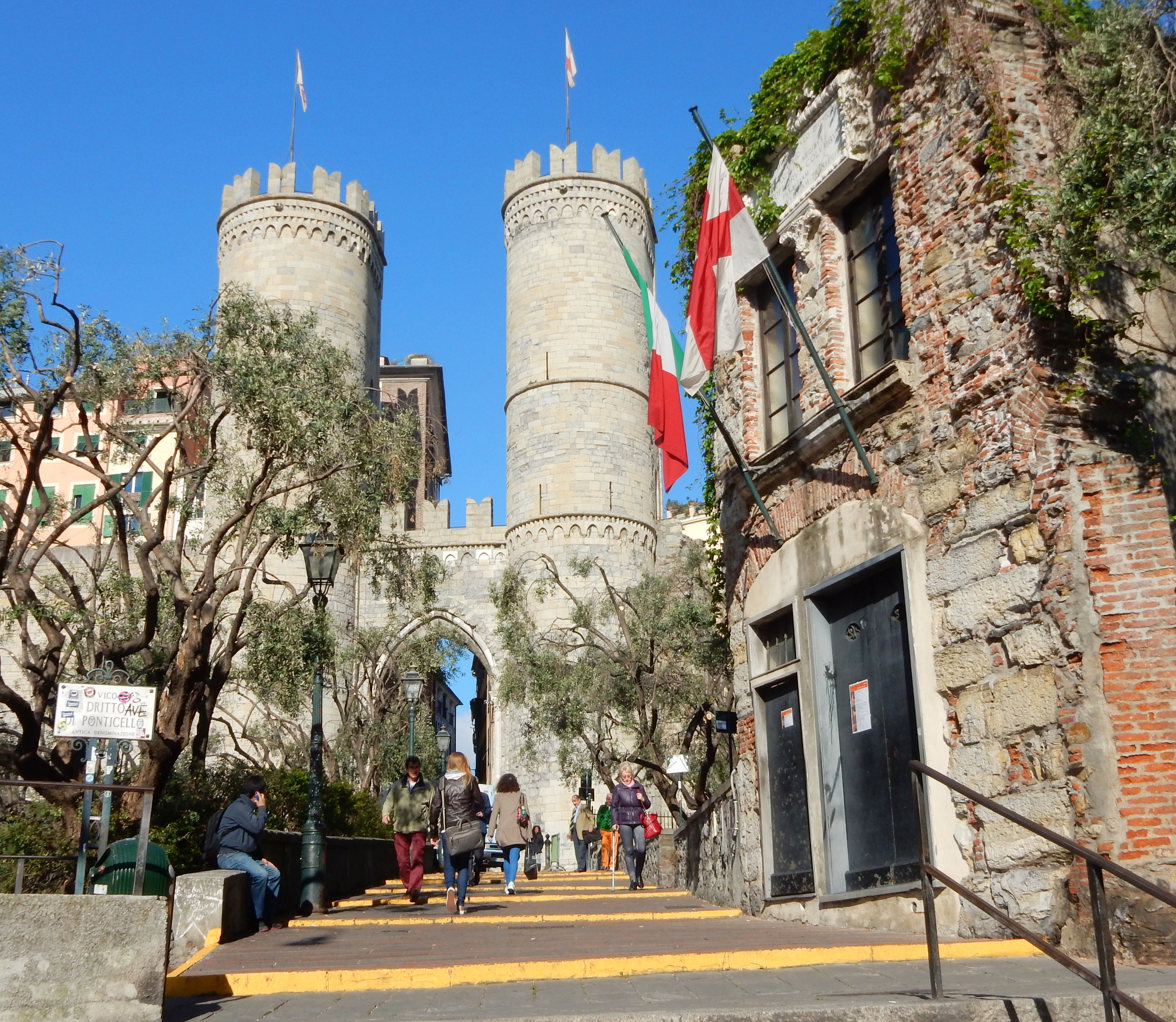
The facade of Columbus' house in the background of the Porta soprana

In Piazza Dante, along the short slope leading to the Porta Soprana, a remnant of the ancient "vico dritto Ponticello," is the house where Christopher Columbus lived his childhood, from 1455 to 1470. This is not, however, the birthplace of the great navigator, which was instead located in Vico dell'Olivella in the nearby Pammatone area and was probably demolished in those very years to build the large hospital there. The house that Domenico Colombo, a weaver, had obtained in emphyteusis from the monastery of Santo Stefano, was part of a cluster of house-shops lined up along the alley leading to Porta Soprana. These houses, destroyed or severely damaged by the French bombardment of 1684 were rebuilt or restored in the years immediately following. Columbus' house, at No. 37 on the street, was purchased in 1887 by the City of Genoa, which had a commemorative plaque affixed to it. A few years later, with the excavation of the entire Sant'Andrea hill, the houses on the north side of Vico dritto Ponticello were demolished. Only this building was partially preserved, keeping the first two floors (corresponding to the original building), while the upper three floors (probably added in the 18th-century restoration) were removed.

The Christopher Columbus house-museum and the nearby Porta Soprana, both of which are open to the public and can be visited, are part of a museum pole entrusted to the "Porta Soprana" cultural association.

==== Monumental Bridge ====
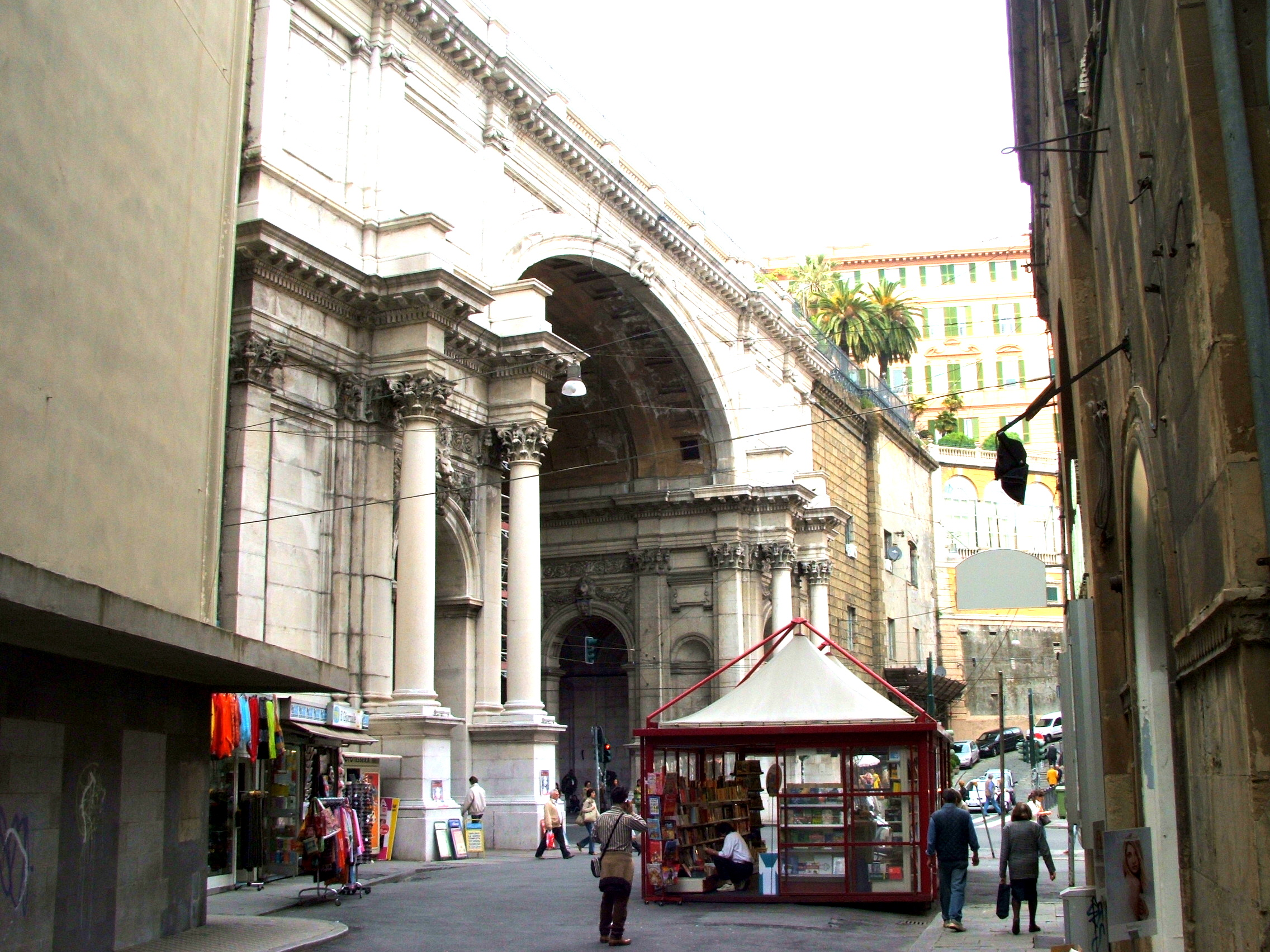
The Monumental Bridge

The Monumental Bridge, which connects the Acquasola walls with those of St. Clare, was built to a design by Cesare Gamba and Riccardo Haupt between 1893 and 1895, replacing the Porta degli Archi, which was dismantled and rebuilt on the Mura del Prato. Over the bridge, which bypasses Via XX Settembre, passes Corso Andrea Podestà, which runs on the ramparts of the 16th-century walls and connects Piazza Corvetto with the Carignano area. Having become one of the landmarks of the modern city, it divides the Portoria area from the S. Vincenzo area and offers an excellent view of Via XX Settembre below. The bridge, 21 meters high above the street level of Via XX Settembre, is built of stone and brick, according to the type of railway arches in use at that time, but was later covered externally with white Mazzano stone. In 1949, the two side arches, decorated with statues by Nino Servettaz, were dedicated to the fallen for freedom: some epigraphs commemorate the names of the fallen of the Resistance, the act of surrender of the German troops of General Meinhold to the Ligurian CLN (April 25, 1945) and the text of the motivation by which Genoa was awarded the gold medal for Resistance in 1947.

==== Skyscrapers in Dante Square ====
Piazza Dante is home to the two rationalist-style skyscrapers built in the 1930s, which characterize the downtown skyline and remained the tallest buildings in the city for many years:

- Piacentini Tower, built from 1935 to 1940 and designed by architect Marcello Piacentini; it has 31 floors and is 108 m high. The terrace on the top floor, now renamed Colombo Terrace, took different names from the rooms it housed (first Capurro Terrace and then, from 1965 until the 1980s, Martini Terrace). The top four floors of the skyscraper house the offices and studios of the television station Primocanale.
- Dante Tower Two, at 83 m (24 stories) was for years the second tallest building in the city. Today it is surpassed in height by several buildings in Genoa, but at the time it was one of the tallest skyscrapers in Italy, as well as the second (after Turin's Torre Littoria) to exceed 80 m. With the advertising sign placed at its top it reaches a total height of about 95 m.

==== Palace of Justice ====
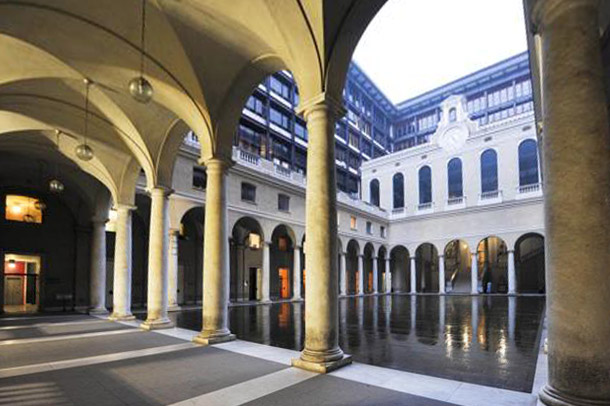
The courtyard of the courthouse, with the portico of the Orsolino

Genoa's new courthouse, which was previously in the Doge's Palace, was built between 1966 and 1974 on the site of the former Pammatone Hospital, of which it retains the inner courtyard with the colonnaded portico of the Orsolino, the monumental staircase, and some of the many statues of benefactors.

The entrance to the building is in the small Portoria Square, where the aforementioned Balilla monument is located. The project was entrusted to designers Giorgio Olcese, Giovanni Romano and Giulio Zappa, who succeeded in integrating the surviving parts of the hospital with a modern steel, glass and concrete structure, also recovering the mezzanine and the large clock in the center to recreate, as far as possible, the original setting of the 18th-century courtyard.

==== The Palace of the Stock Exchange ====
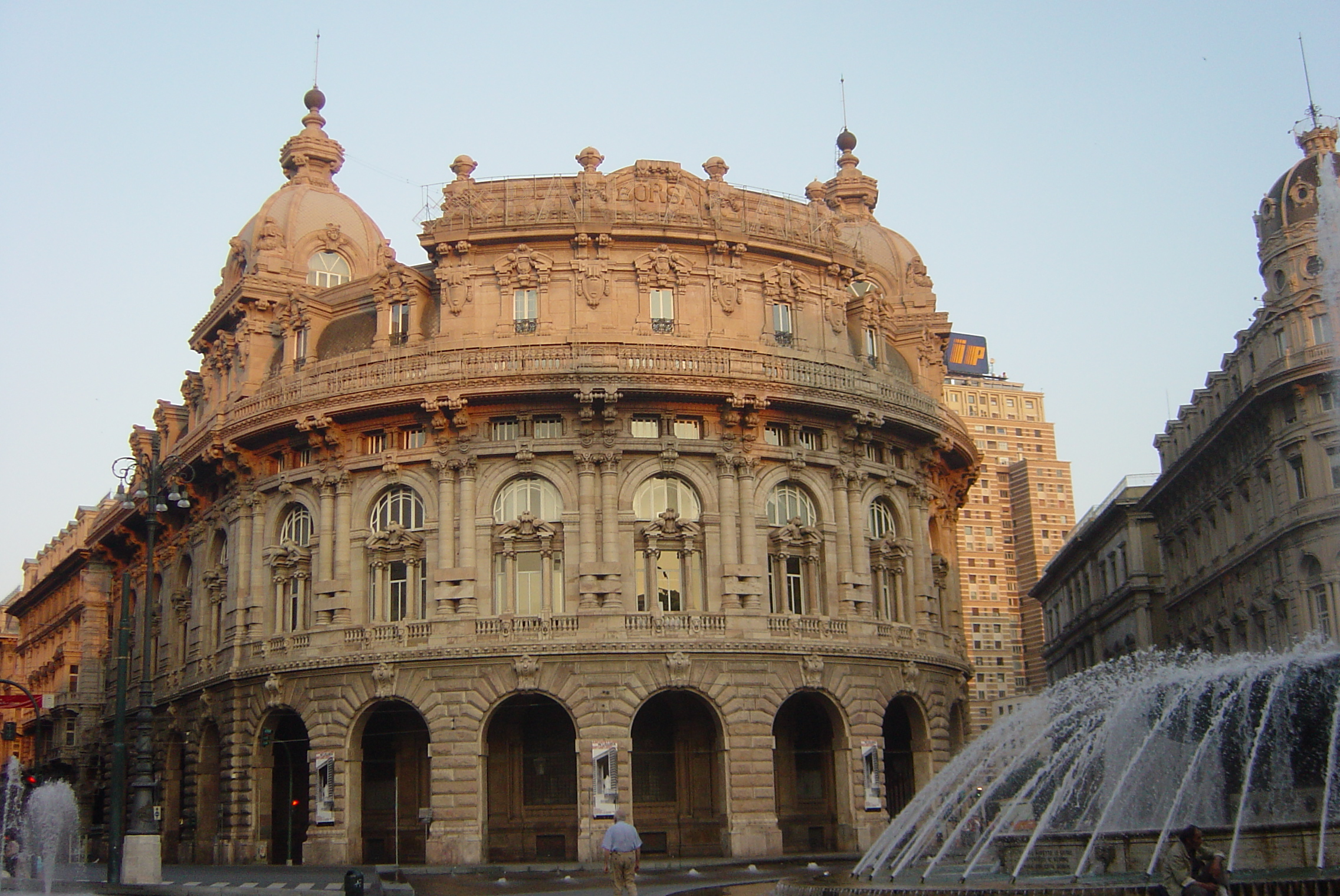
The Palace of the Stock Exchange

It was built between 1907 and 1912, designed by Dario Carbone, while Adolfo Coppedè, brother of the better-known Gino Coppedè, took care of the rich interior decoration. The palace had then replaced the old Loggia dei Mercanti in Piazza Banchi; having ceased to play its role with the advent of the telematic stock exchange, it is now used as a venue for thematic exhibitions set up in the magnificent Art Nouveau-style trading hall. Located at the corner of Venti Settembre Street and Dante Street, it occupies the space of the former St. Andrew's Hill. The rich decoration in eclectic style did not please the citizens at the time of its construction.

==== Palace of the Ligustic Academy of Fine Arts ====
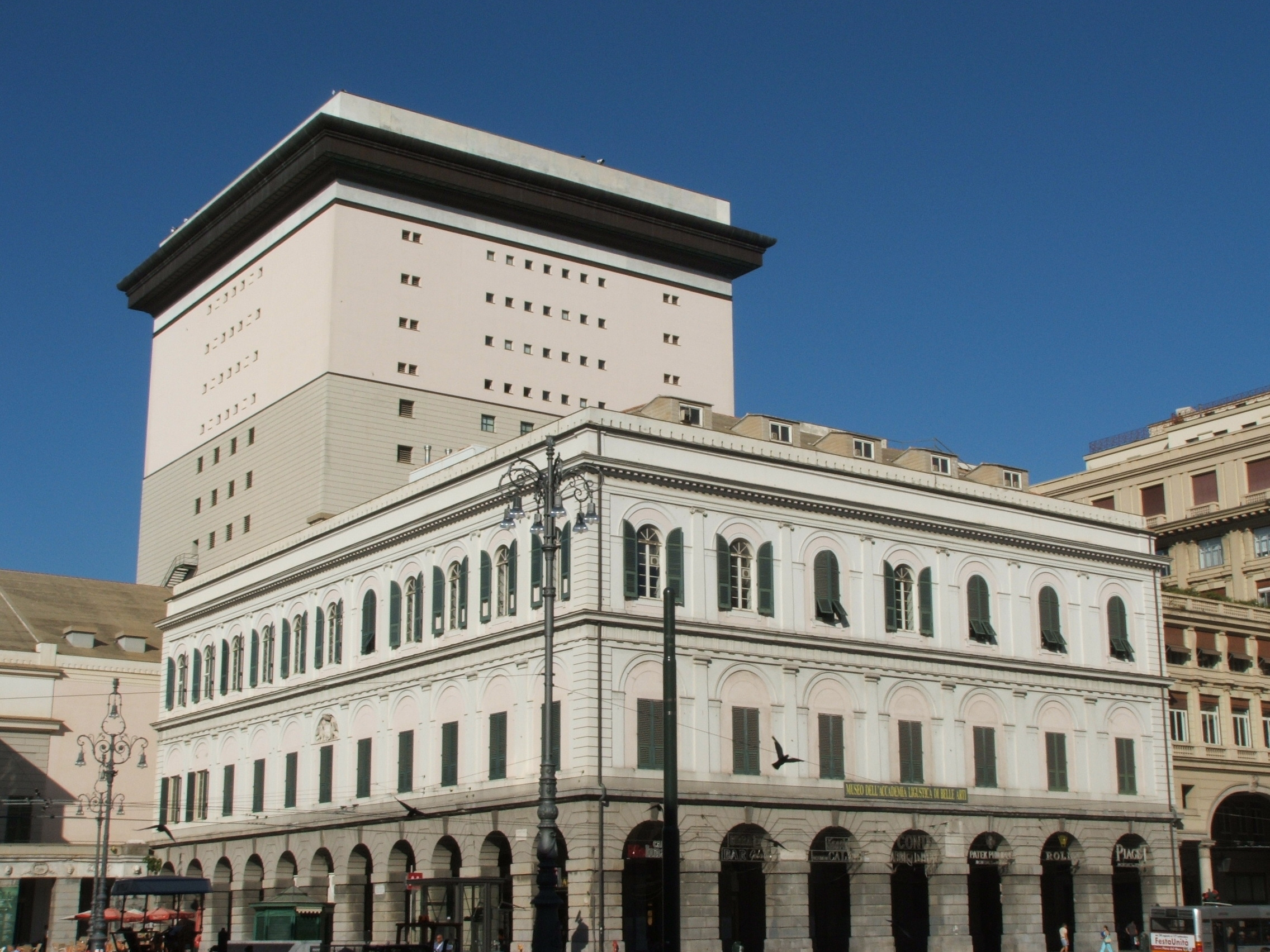
The Palace of the Ligustic Academy

The Ligustic Academy of Fine Arts, founded in 1741, has been based since 1831 in this neoclassical palace designed by Carlo Barabino. The palace houses the Museum of the Ligustic Academy, which displays works by Ligurian painters from the 13th to the 20th century. Its austere porticoes connect with those of the nearby Carlo Felice Theater. The building was badly damaged by bombing in 1942 and restored after the war.

Until 1998 it was also home to the Berio Civic Library. For a time it also housed the collections of the Edoardo Chiossone Museum of Oriental Art, later moved to its current location at Villetta Dinegro.

==== Palaces of Via XX Settembre ====
The long artery is divided in two by the Ponte Monumentale; the stretch that affects the Portoria district is the western one, from Ponte Monumentale to Piazza De Ferrari, and presents on the north side typical Art Nouveau architecture, with "bay window" facades of neo-Renaissance inspiration rich in decoration, while on the south side architecture of neo-Mannerist and neo-Baroque inspiration prevails. In contrast to the east side, this section of the street is characterized on both sides by high porticoes with Venetian-style floors, the design of which echoes that of the ceiling. At the church of S. Stefano above, a section of the portico on the north side was built in neo-Gothic style by Cesare Gamba, with a reinterpretation of the typical medieval Genoese porticoes.

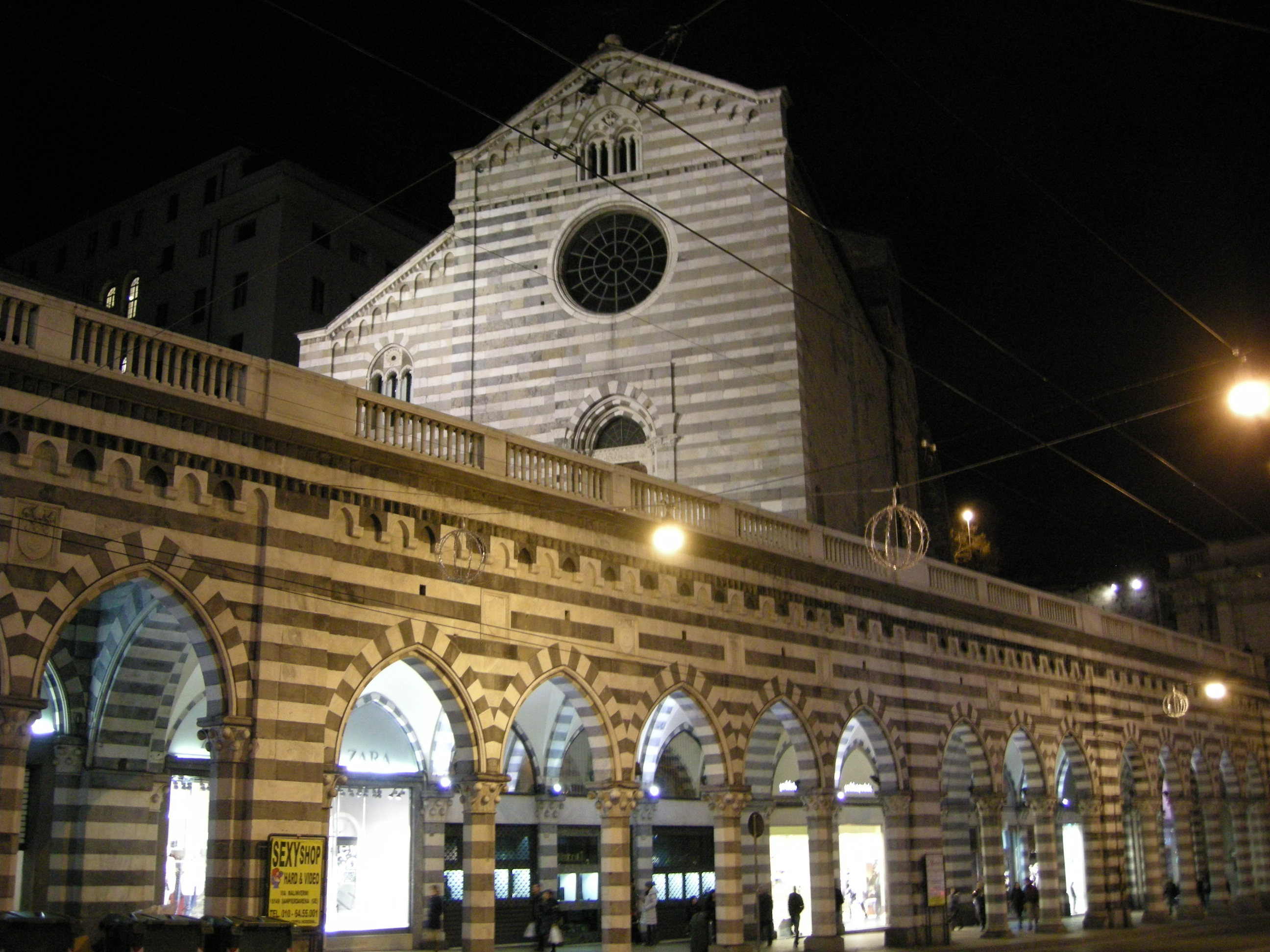
Neo-Gothic porticoes of the church of S. Stefano

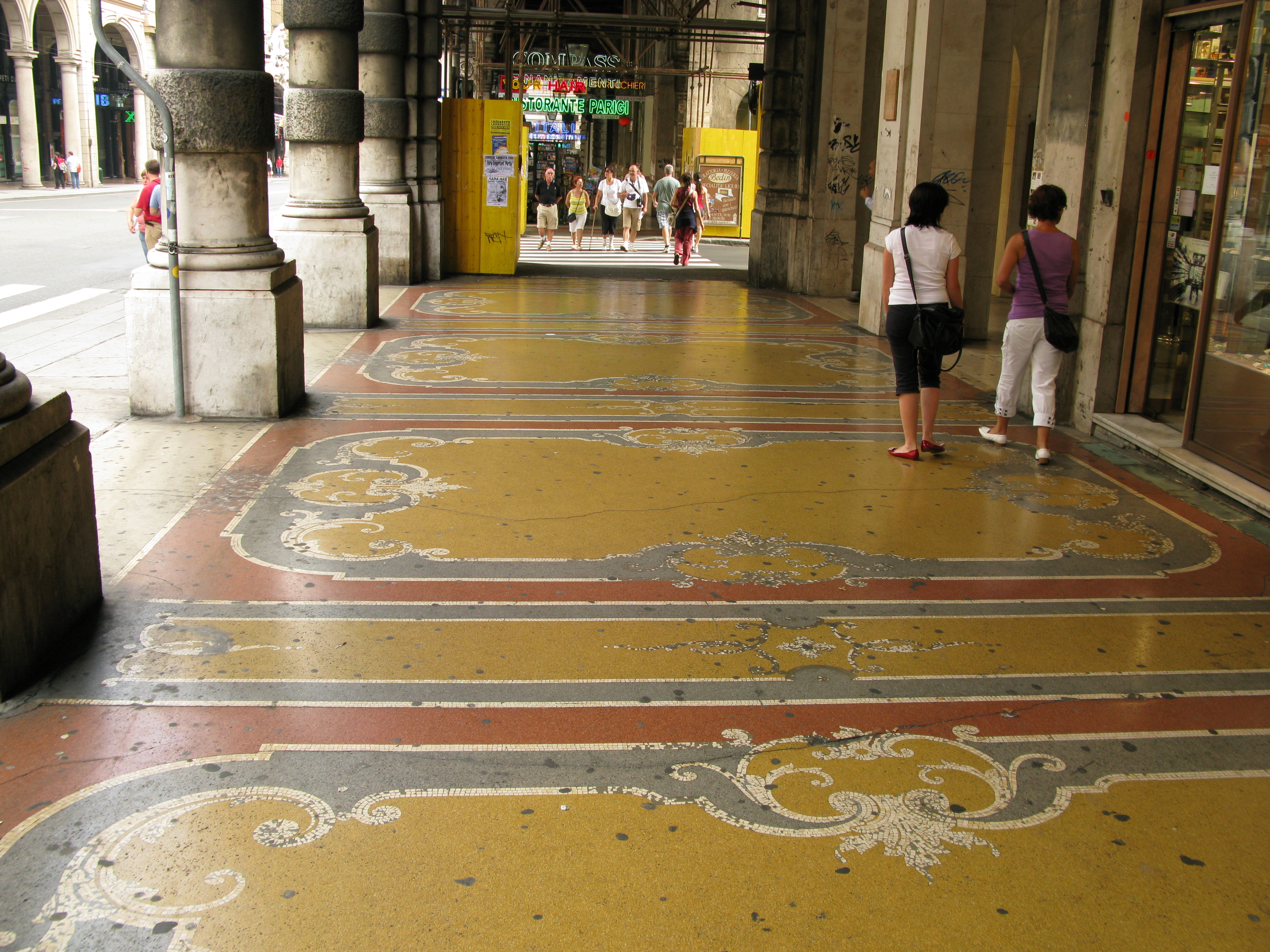
The "Venetian-style" paving of the porticoes

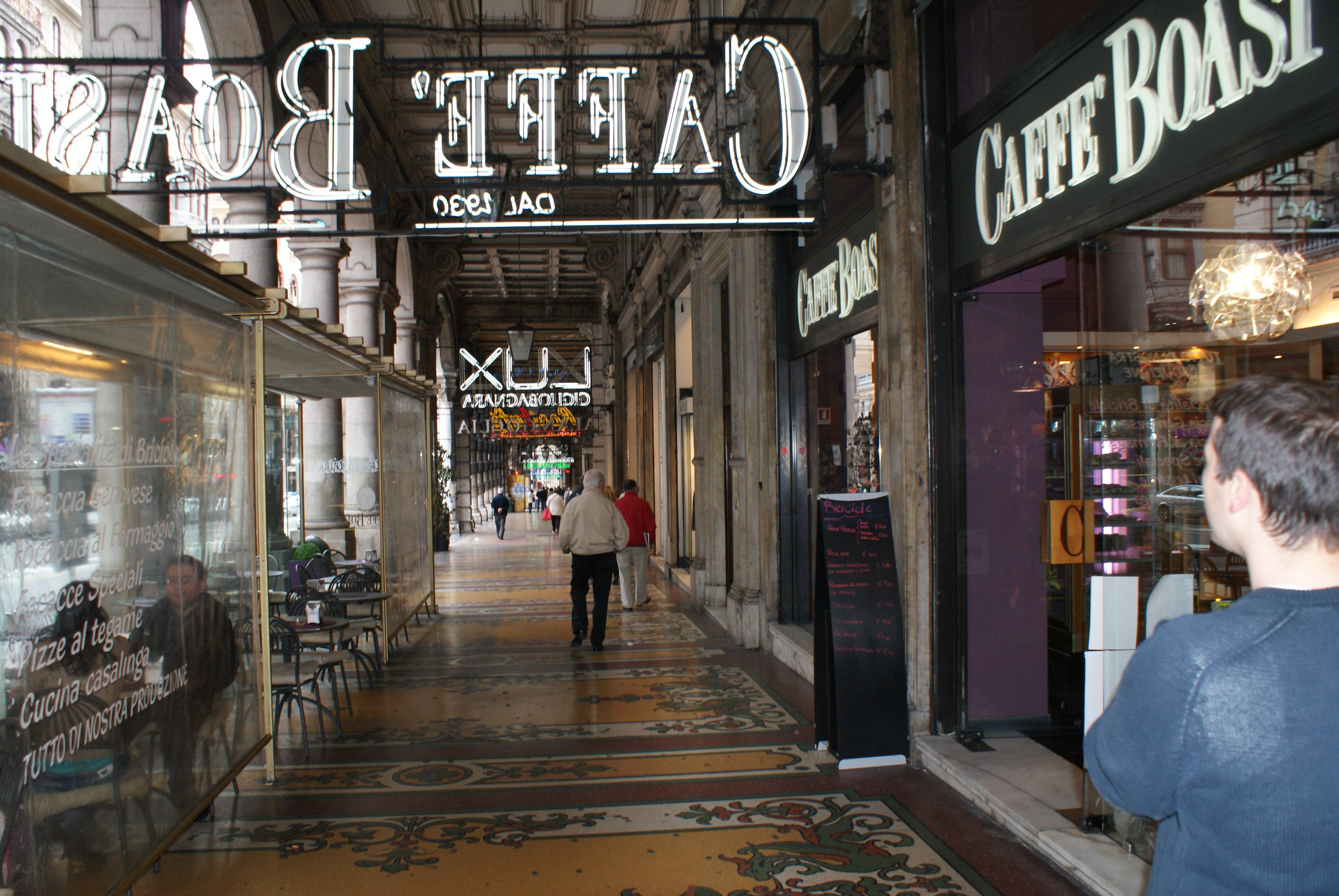
Another detail of the arcades on the south side of the street

===== Palaces on the north side =====
- Civico 29 (Gaetano Orzali, 1905). A building with three large bay windows extended over three floors and remarkable Art Nouveau decorated railings. The atrium features a double-flight staircase. The porticoes below are connected to those of the next building by a wide pink marble portal, surmounted by the coat of arms of Genoa in white marble, originally modified by replacing the two griffins with male nudes and the crown with a headdress adorned with spheres.
- Civici 31, 33 and 35. These buildings are similar in structure and decoration, with facades enlivened by richly decorated bay windows. Civico 35 is home to the Hotel Bristol Palace.
- Civico 41. The building at the top of the street, partly facing Piazza De Ferrari with a curvilinear facade, is topped by a dome. It is a postwar reconstruction (1951) of the original building, destroyed by bombing in World War II. It houses the Genoa headquarters of the daily newspaper La Repubblica and that of the television station Telenord.
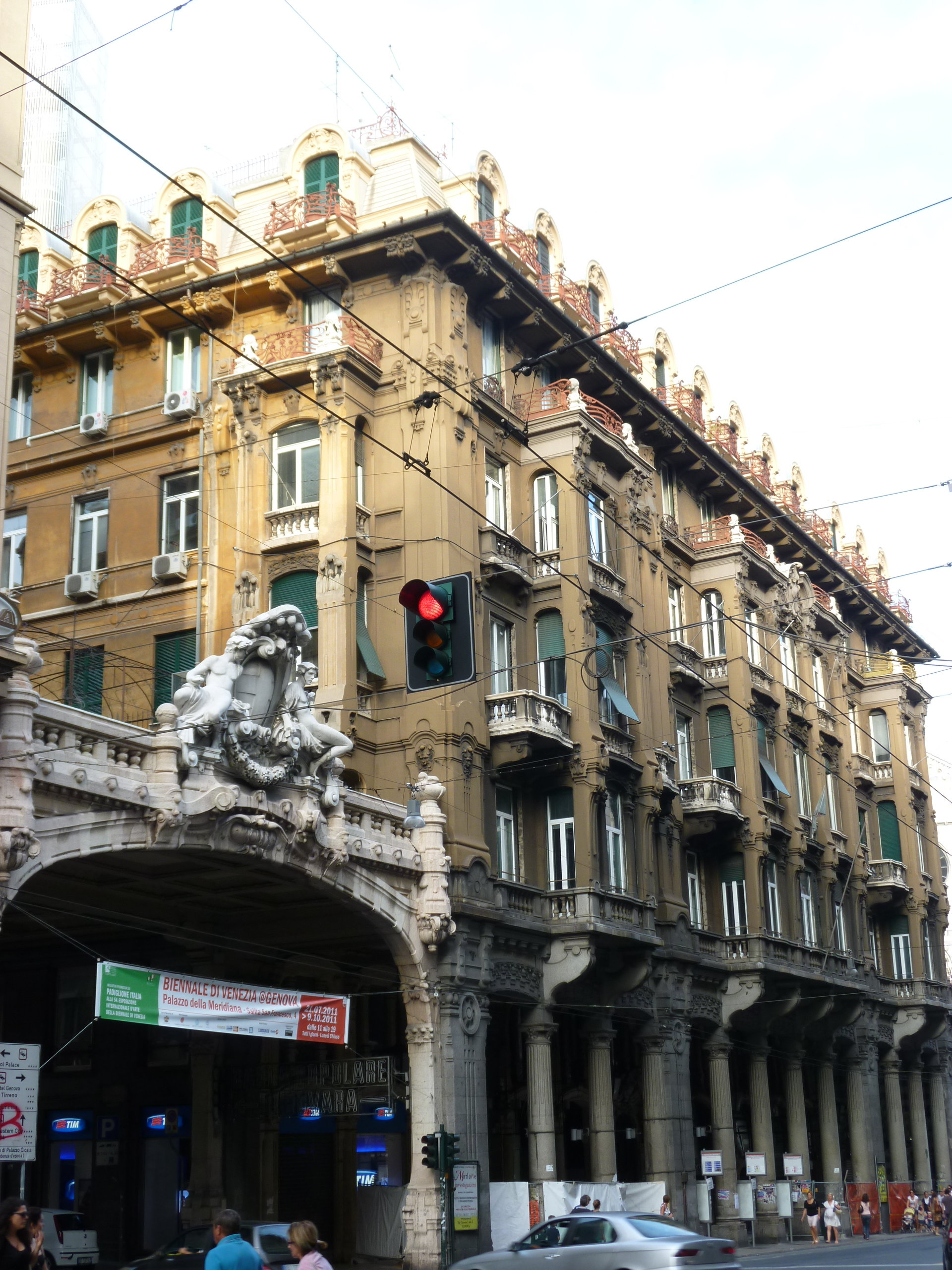
Civico 29

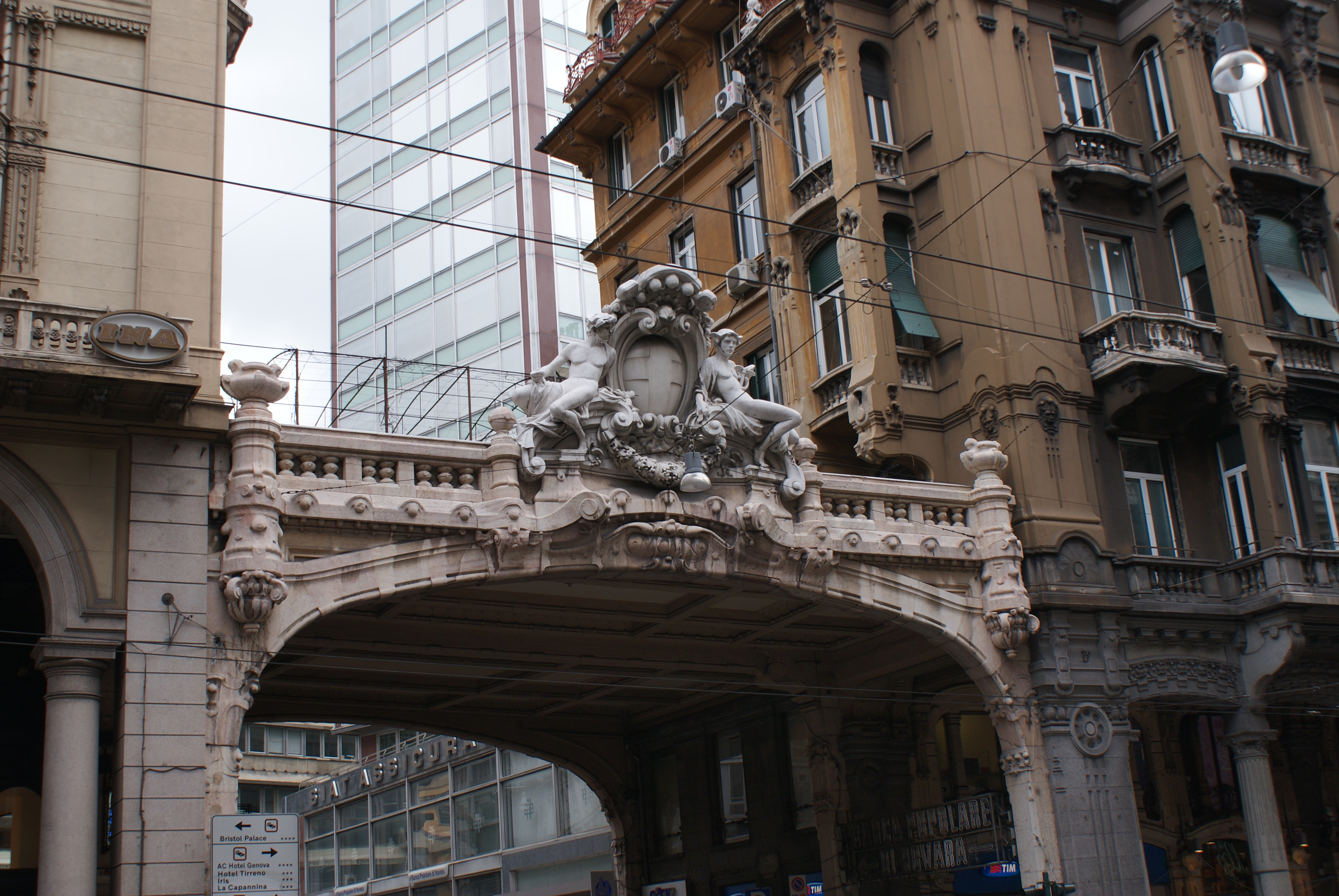
Detail of the portal between house numbers 29 and 31

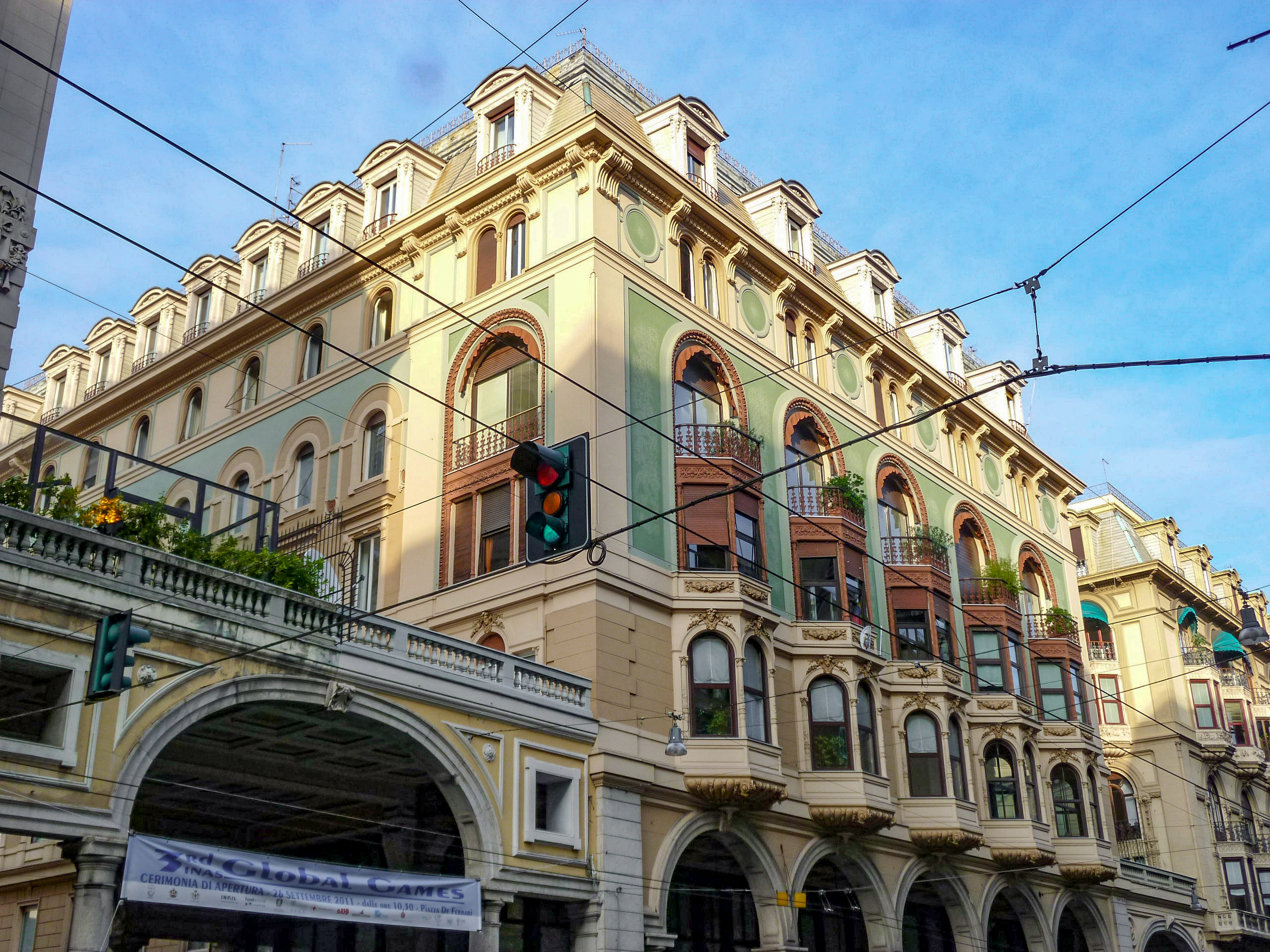
Civici 31-33
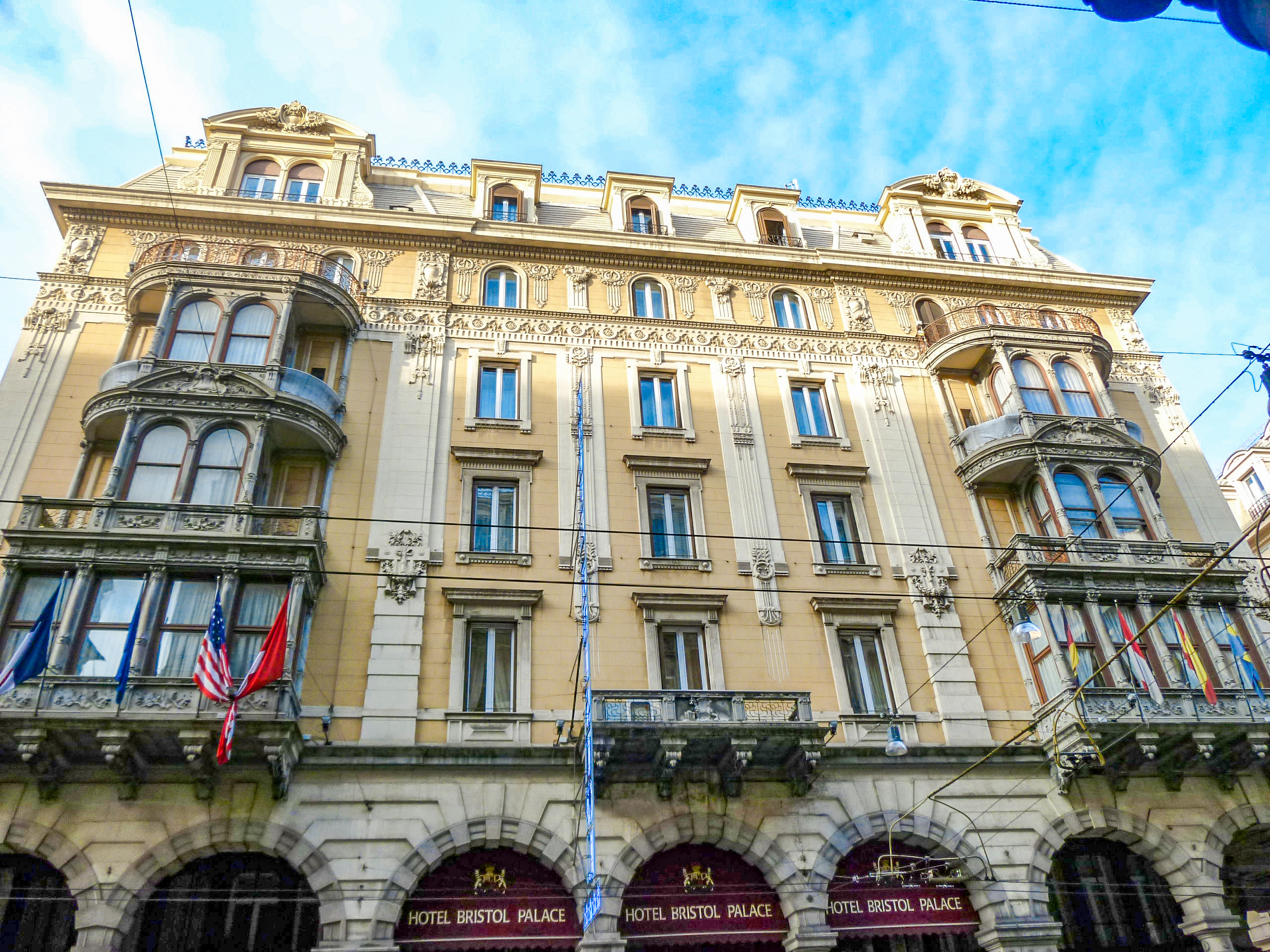
Civico 35, Hotel Bristol Palace

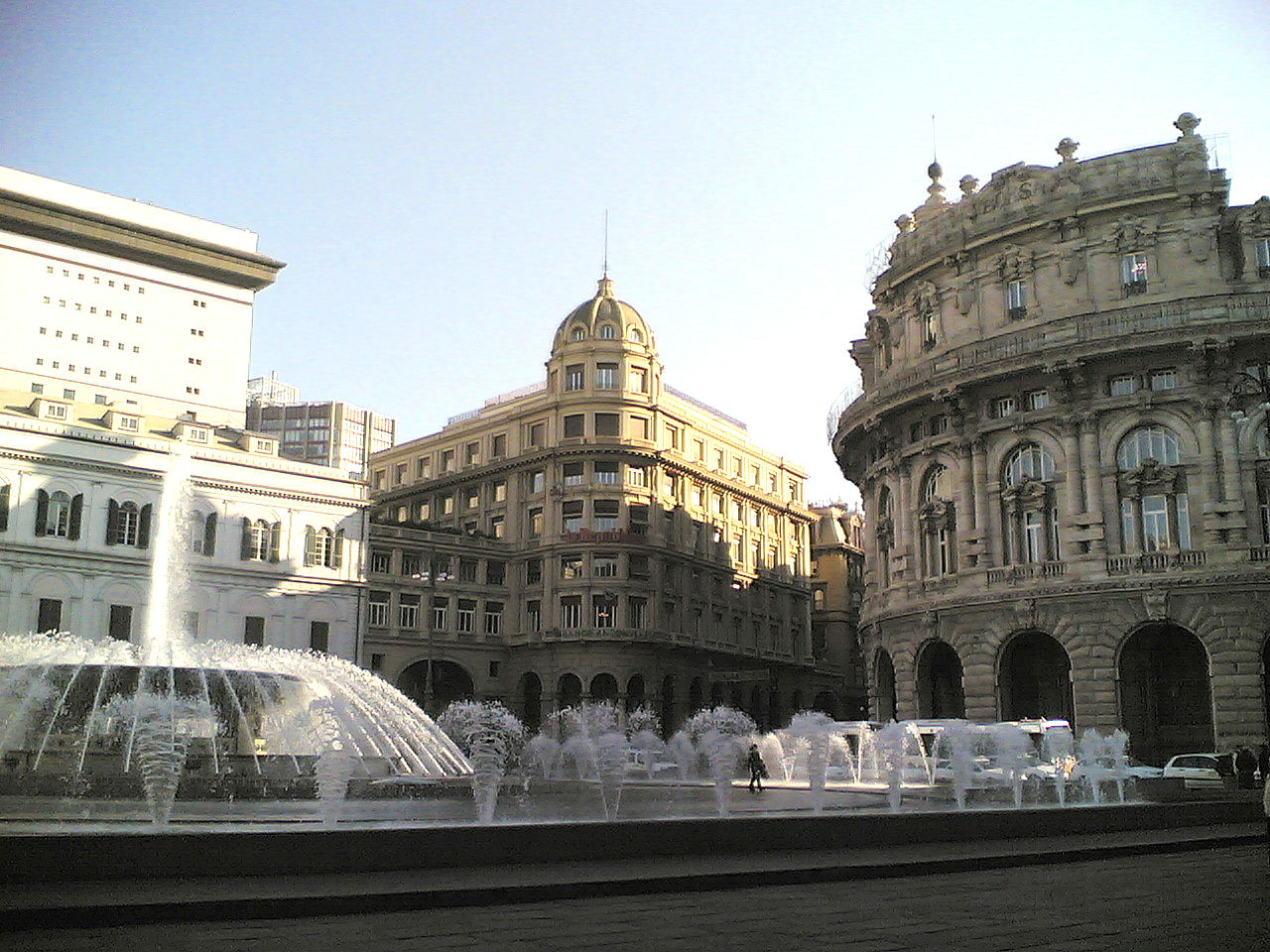
Civico 41, center of the photo, seen from Piazza De Ferrari

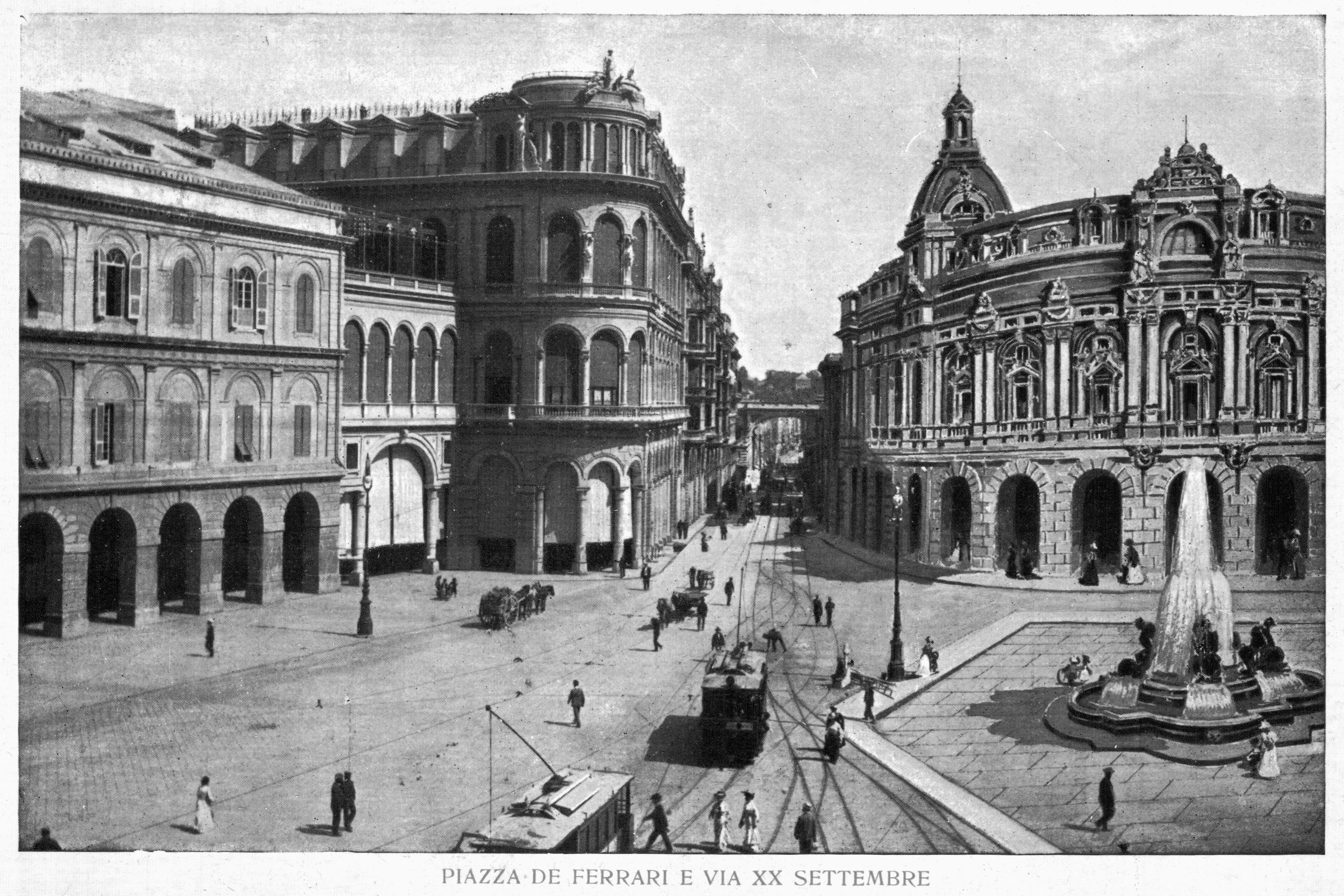
The original building at no. 41, destroyed by bombs in 1942

===== Buildings on the south side =====
- Civico 26 (Benvenuto Pesce, 1909). Also in Art Nouveau style, with oriental decorations, it has five floors plus a mezzanine, with the façade, richly decorated and characterized by two polygonal turrets extended over four floors.
- Civico 28 (Raffaele Croce, 1909). The building has five floors. The brightly colored facade is decorated with openwork balconies and mullioned and three-light windows. The building is topped by two pagoda domes with copper roofing.
- Civico 30-32 (G. B. Carpineti, 1902). The building has a tripartite facade in both width and height, decorated with pilasters and an ashlar finish on the corners.
- Civico 34 (Luigi Rovelli, 1902). The palace, with its neo-Mannerist elevation, has an irregular plan due to its location. Characteristic is the large projecting cornice, into which the fifth-floor windows open.
- Civico 36 (Benvenuto Pesce, 1909). The facade has narrow, elongated windows, well spaced and surrounded by elegant decorations. The top floor consists of a loggia with paired colonettes.
- Civico 42 (G. B. Carpineti, 1905). The five floors are well highlighted by pilasters horizontally and balconies vertically, with windows alternating with bay windows on the lower floors. Originally built as a hotel, the ground floor features a large open space supported by columns with a semi-circular exedra from which an elliptical staircase begins.
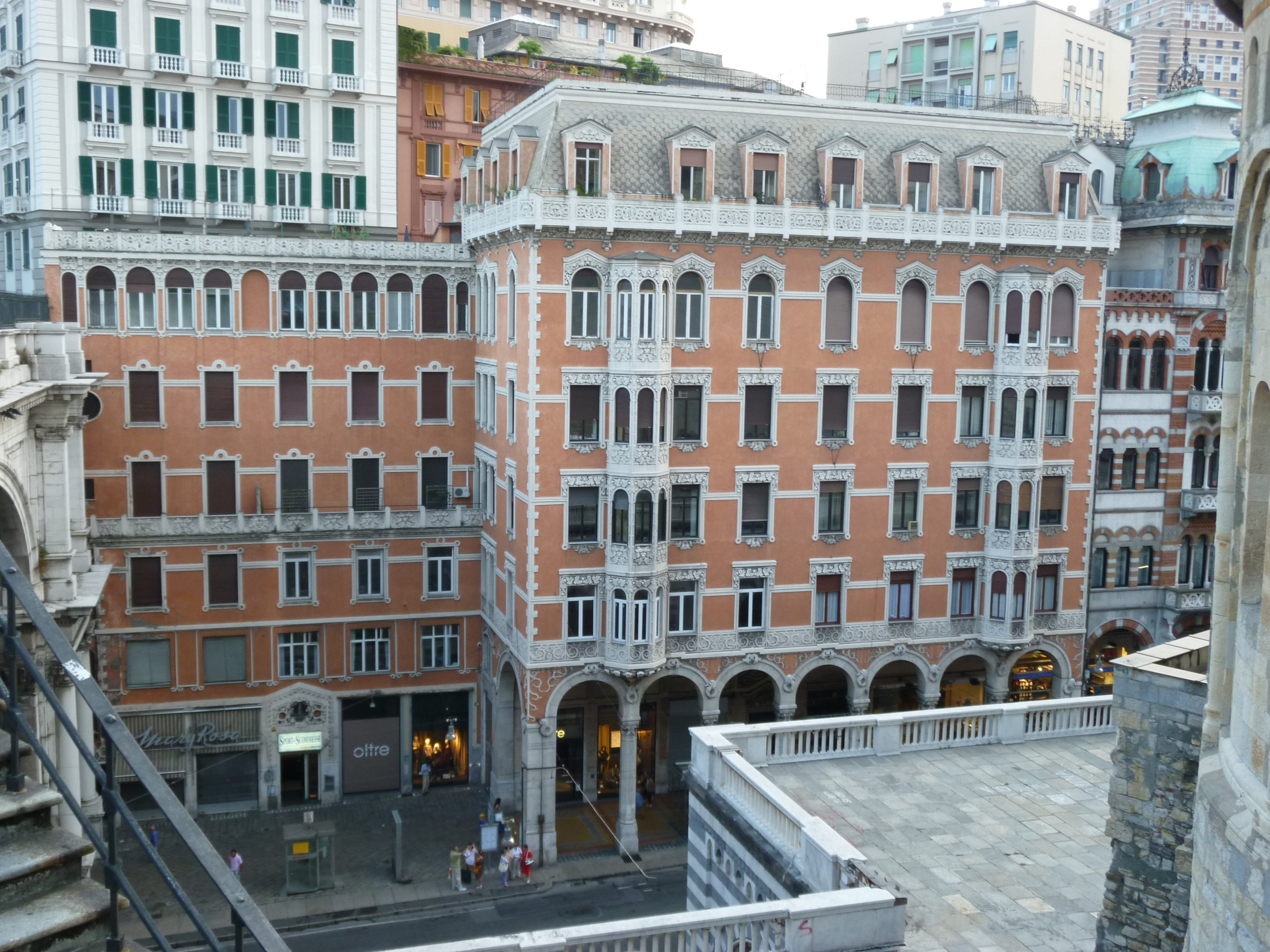
Civico 26

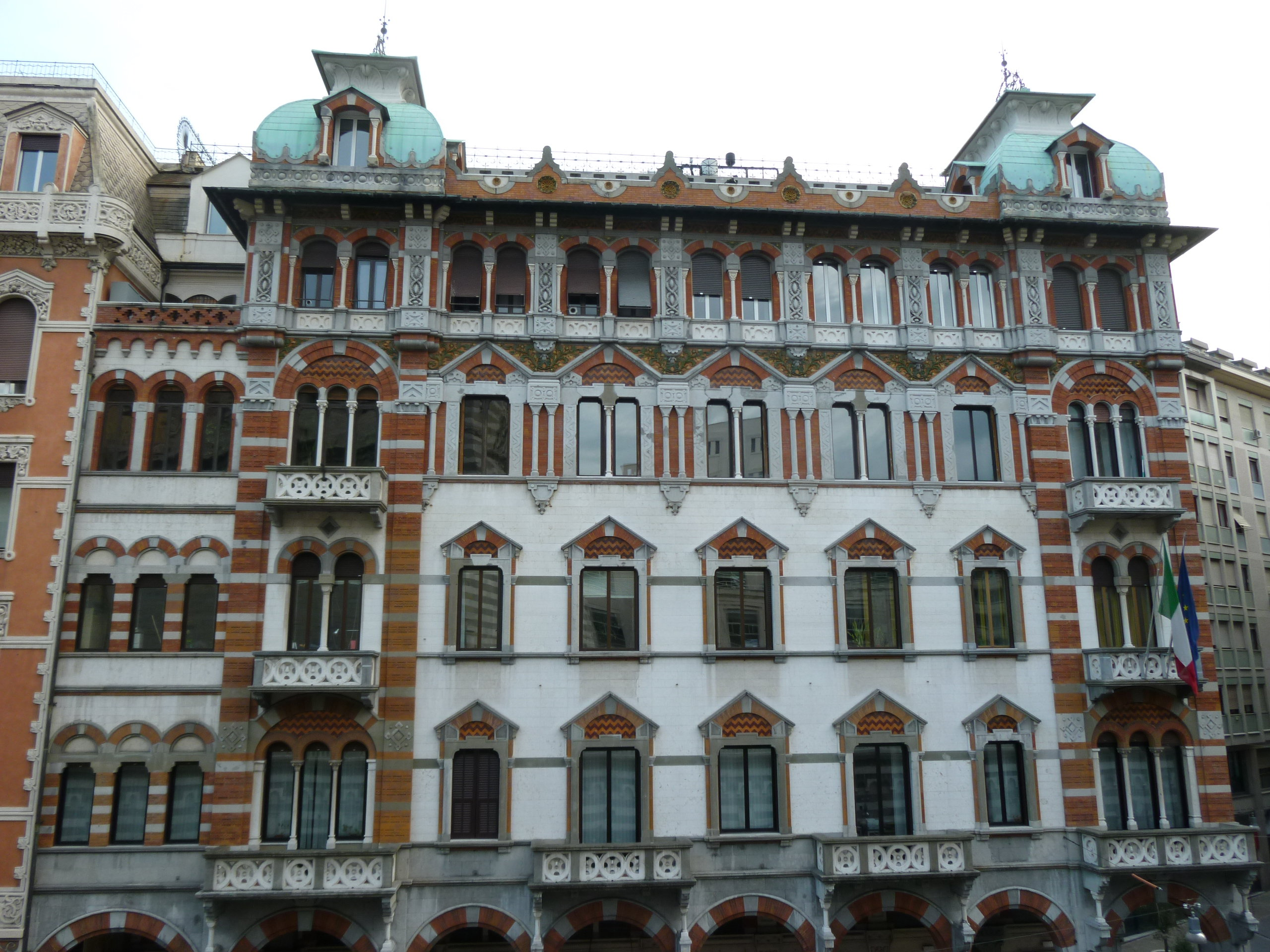
Civico 28

==== Palazzo Pastorino ====
Palazzo Pastorino

Adjacent to the church of S. Stefano and the Monumental Bridge, on Via Bartolomeo Bosco, is Palazzo Pastorino, a 1908 work by Gino Coppedè. With its white stone facade and the richness of its decorations, it is considered one of the Florentine architect's best Genoese achievements in the sphere of civic buildings. Similar to the Zuccarino palace in Via Maragliano, compared to this one it shows a more balanced and concentrated decoration especially around the entrance portal, windows, balconies and cornice.

=== Religious architecture ===
Of the many religious buildings in the district, the very old Abbey of St. Stephen (although almost completely rebuilt after the war) and three historic churches, once attached to convent complexes, remain today

==== Church of St. Stephen ====
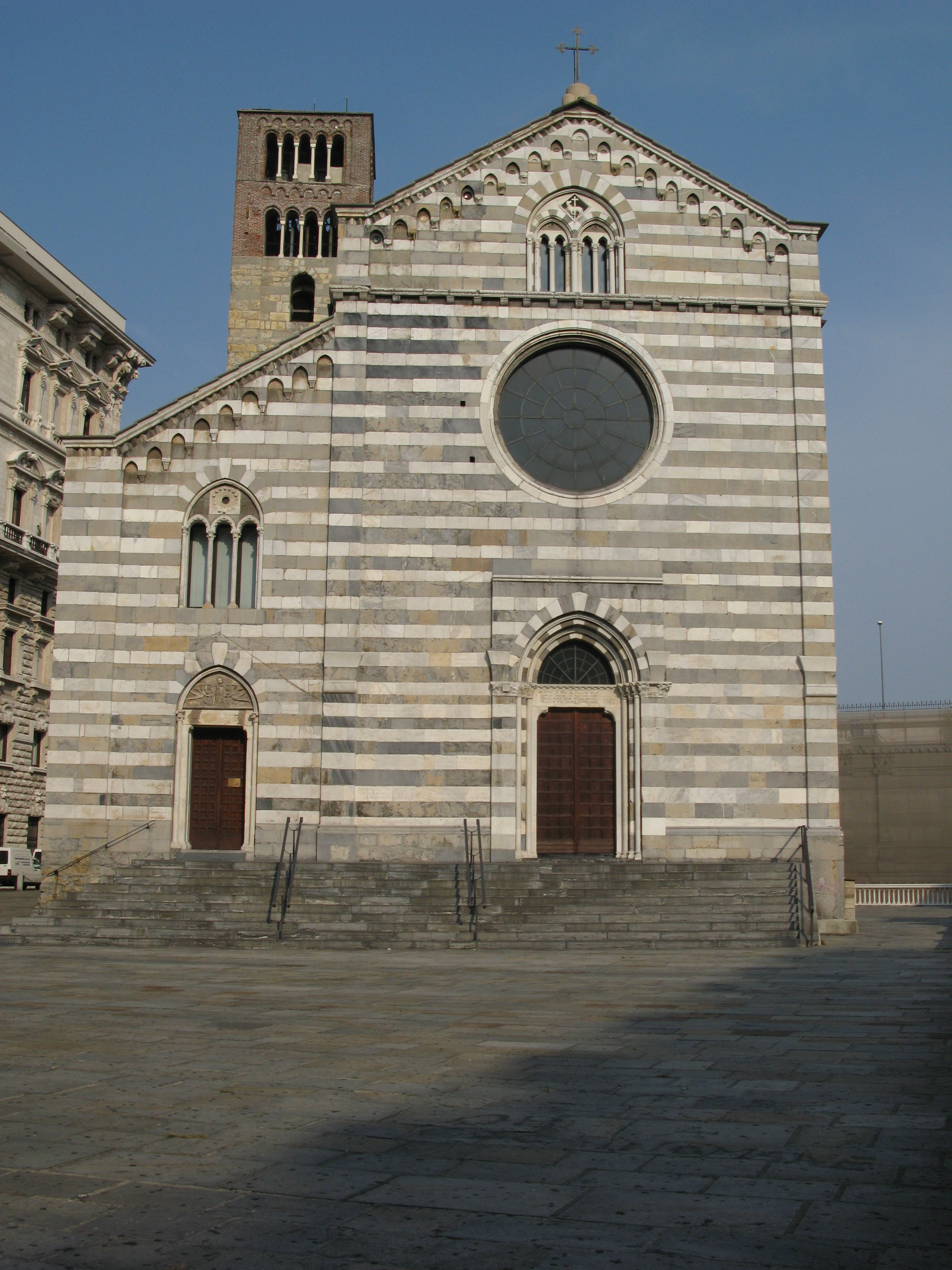
Church of St. Stephen

The Abbey of Santo Stefano, located on a rise overlooking Via XX Settembre, is one of the oldest churches in Genoa; its parish community is part of the "Carignano - Foce" vicariate of the archdiocese of Genoa. In this church Christopher Columbus was baptized.

The present building, commissioned by Bishop Theodulf, was built around 972 on the remains of a Lombard-era chapel dedicated to St. Michael the Archangel, probably destroyed by the Saracens in 934. Entrusted from the beginning to the monks of the abbey of St. Columbanus of Bobbio, it was at the center of a vast landed estate extending to the whole of the present district and with properties in Oltregiogo as well. Erected as a parish church in the 11th century, it was rebuilt in 1217 on the model of the abbey church in Bobbio. In the 14th century the brick dome was built and the bell tower erected, probably on the remains of an earlier watchtower. With the erection of the 14th-century city walls the church and convent were incorporated into the city area.

In 1401 a papal bull by Pope Boniface IX transformed the abbey into a "commenda"; the complex in 1529 passed to the Benedictine monks of the Abbey of Monte Oliveto, who remained there until 1775, when the church and convent were entrusted to the secular clergy. The convent, which was partially demolished in 1536 for the expansion of the walls and rebuilt in 1652, disappeared for good in the early twentieth century during work on the opening of Via XX Settembre.

The church in the early twentieth century was in a poor state of repair, and in 1901 a restoration was initiated by Alfredo d'Andrade. In 1904 began the construction of a new church (Camillo Galliano and Cesare Barontini), in neo-Romanesque style, which was inaugurated in 1908 and was damaged in 1912 by the partial collapse of the old one, which had already been closed to worship after the inauguration of the new building. Both churches were then almost completely destroyed by bombing in World War II. After the war it was decided to rebuild only the old church, which was rebuilt between 1946 and 1955 to a design by Carlo Ceschi, strictly respecting the original structure, of which the apse part remains, considered one of the best examples of Genoese Romanesque architecture. During the works, further evidence of the vast pre-Roman necropolis already discovered during the earthworks for the opening of Via XX Settembre and the widening of Piazza De Ferrari was found. The church, in Romanesque style, has a rectangular plan and a single nave, with a raised presbytery under which is a crypt, probably the original nucleus of the chapel dedicated to St. Michael. The facade is decorated with black and white bands, typical of Genoese Romanesque architecture, with a large rose window in the center, surmounted by a double mullioned window. Numerous works of art preserved in the two churches were destroyed by bombing, among those that were saved notable are two paintings depicting the "Martyrdom of St. Stephen" by Giulio Romano and the "Martyrdom of St. Bartholomew" by Giulio Cesare Procaccini.

==== Church of the SS. Annunziata in Portoria ====
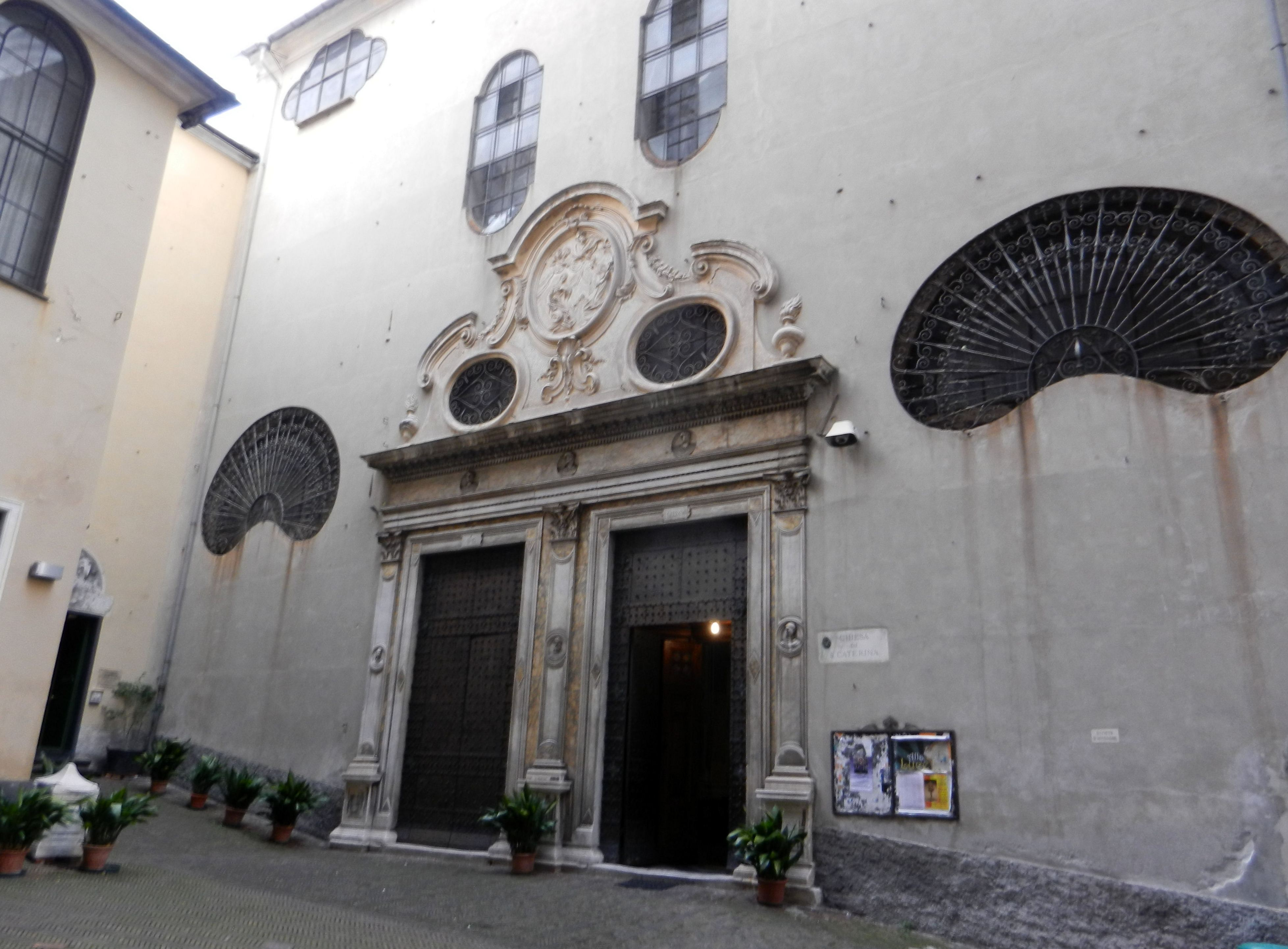
Church of the SS. Annunziata, entrance portal

The Church of the SS. Annunziata di Portoria, better known as the "church of Saint Catherine," whose history is closely linked to that of the vanished Pammatone hospital, is located near the Acquasola esplanade and a short distance from the church of S. Stefano. Together with the adjoining convent, it was built beginning in 1488 by the Friars Minor, who were succeeded in 1538 by the Capuchins, who provided spiritual care to the sick in the adjacent hospital. In the 16th century the church and convent underwent partial demolition for the construction of the new city walls. The church was rebuilt beginning in 1556. Numerous patrician families who had their aristocratic tombs in the church contributed to its reconstruction, and between the 16th and 18th centuries they enriched it with works of art, calling the most talented artists of the time to complete them. It is commonly known as "St. Catherine's Church" because the body of the saint, canonized in 1737, is preserved there.

The adjoining monastery houses the Capuchin Cultural Heritage Museum, where artistic goods, sacred furnishings and everyday objects from Capuchin monasteries in Liguria are collected.

==== Church of the Jesus ====
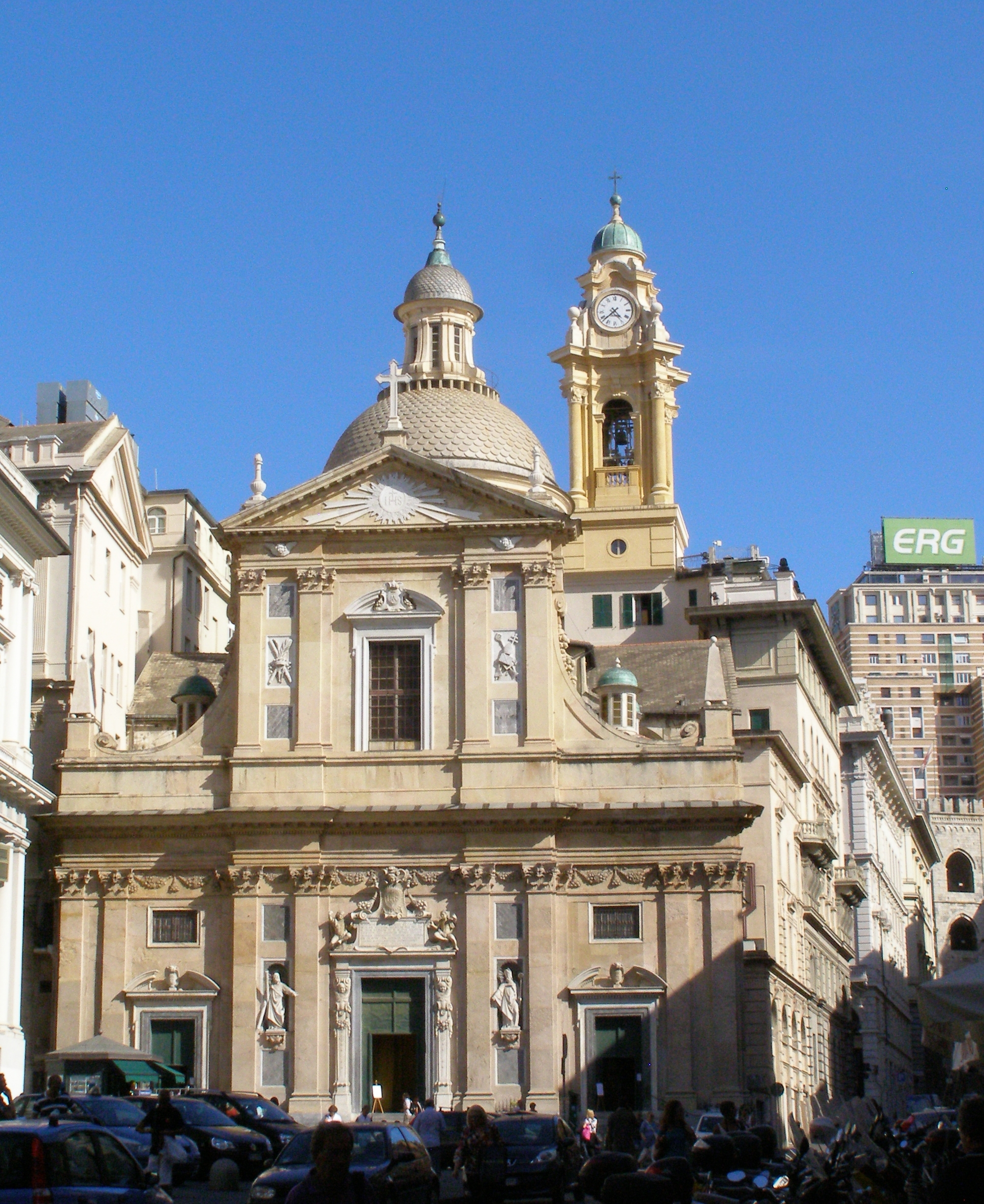
Church of the Jesus

The Church of the Most Holy Name of Jesus, commonly called "Church of the Jesus," faces Piazza Matteotti, a few meters from Piazza De Ferrari.

It was built between 1589 and 1606 by the Jesuits, who had been present in Genoa since 1552, on the site of the ancient church of Saint Ambrose, one of the oldest in Genoa, dating back to the 6th century. The construction was financed by Father Marcello Pallavicino; the building's design, of Baroque forms, is attributed to Jesuit Giuseppe Valeriano. The Jesuits named the church after "the name of Jesus," although popularly still for many years it continued to be called "St. Ambrose Church," after the ancient building. The Jesuits enriched it with valuable masterpieces. The façade, initially made only in the lower part, was completed in the second half of the 19th century according to the original design. In 1894 statues of Saints Ambrose and Andrew, by Michele Ramognino, were placed on either side of the entrance portal.

The church has remarkable frescoes and paintings by important seventeenth-century artists such as Peter Paul Rubens, Guido Reni, Domenico Piola, Simon Vouet, Giovanni Battista and Giovanni Carlone, Lorenzo De Ferrari, and Valerio Castello.

The original church had been founded in 569 by the Bishop of Milan Honoratus, who, following the Lombard invasion of northern Italy, had transferred the seat of the Milanese diocese to Genoa, still under Byzantine rule. Around the middle of the seventh century Giovanni Bono brought his chair back to the Milanese city, but the Milanese diocese retained ownership of the church for several centuries.

==== Church of Santa Croce and San Camillo de Lellis ====
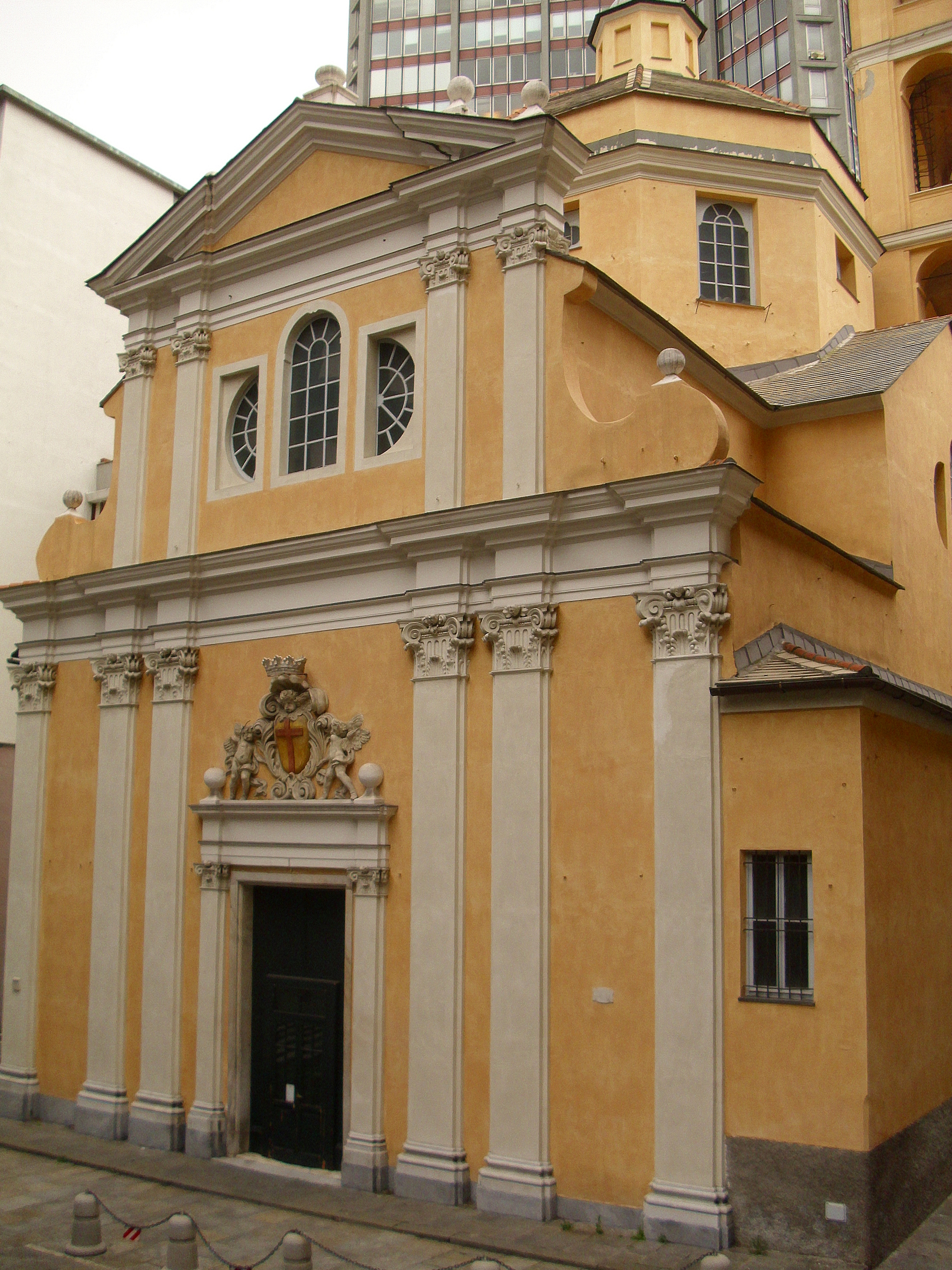
The church of St. Camillus

The Church of the Holy Cross and St. Camillus de Lellis is located in the heart of ancient Portoria, a few dozen meters from the Palace of Justice and 12th October Street.

An early church dedicated to the Holy Cross had been built in the early seventeenth century on land donated by the nobleman Barnaba Centurione to the Camillian Fathers, who operated in the nearby hospitals of Pammatone and Incurabili.

Due to numerous donations, the present church was built between 1667 and 1695, the design of which is attributed to the Lombard architect Carlo Muttone. A convent was attached to the church, which was demolished in the 1960s for the opening of Via XII Ottobre, in the context of urban interventions for the construction of the business center of Piccapietra. After the canonization of the founder of the Camillians (1746), his name was added to the title of the church. Closed due to the laws of suppression of religious orders at the beginning of the 19th century, it became the property of the municipality of Genoa in 1866 and was again entrusted to the Camillians, who still officiate there today. The church suffered damage from bombing in World War II and was restored in the 1950s.

The building has a Greek-cross plan, with a large octagonal dome and a bell tower with a rectangular base. Inside are 18th-century frescoes by Gregorio De Ferrari and his son Lorenzo, including the Triumph of the Cross cycle, and paintings by Lorenzo De Ferrari, G.B. Baiardo and Valerio Castello. The fresco depicting an architectural structure with twisting columns inside the drum of the dome is the work of quadraturist Francesco Maria Costa (1672-1736).

==== Church of Santa Marta ====
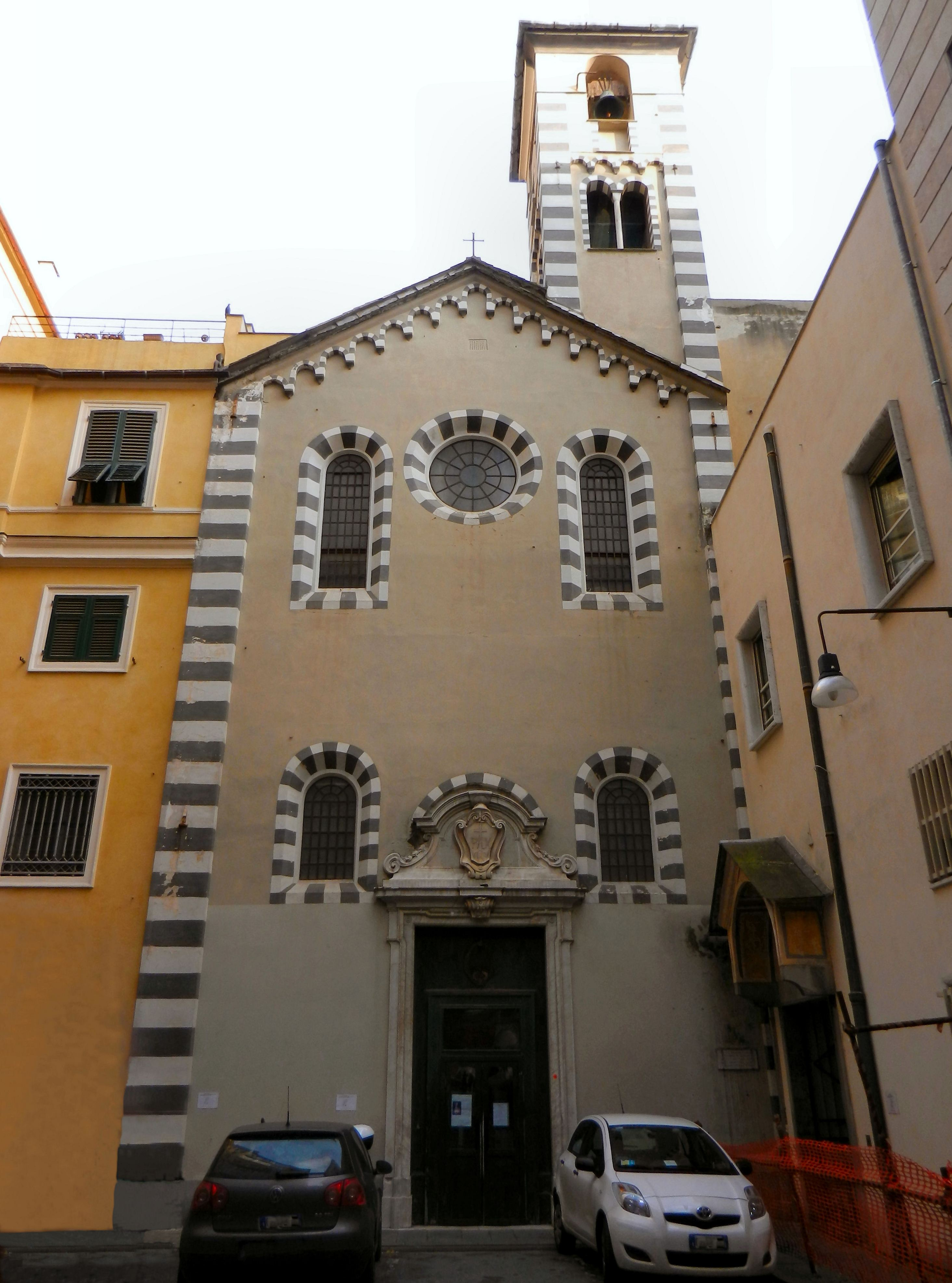
The church of Santa Marta

Santa Marta Church is located in the small square of the same name, adjacent to Piazza Corvetto and Via Roma. Today almost completely smothered by the urban development of the neighborhood, and for this reason little known even by many Genoese, it can be accessed from Piazza Corvetto, via a staircase leading to the side entrance, or through an archivolt in Largo Eros Lanfranco, in front of the prefecture building, or even from the commercial gallery on Via XII Ottobre.

The church in its present form dates from the 16th century, but a church dedicated to St. Germanus, built by the Humiliati, stood here as early as 1133. Rebuilt beginning in 1535 and dedicated to St. Martha, it retains the 14th-century Lombard band frame in the facade. The Baroque interior has the typical structure of women's monastic churches, with three naves and a raised choir with two tribunes along the walls of the nave. Between the 17th and 18th centuries it was richly decorated by the best Genoese artists of that period, such as Giovanni Battista Carlone, Valerio Castello, Lorenzo De Ferrari, Domenico Fiasella, Carlo Giuseppe Ratti, and Domenico and Paolo Gerolamo Piola. On the high altar is a marble statue of Saint Martha in Glory by Filippo Parodi and a crucifix by Giovan Francesco Gaggini.

After the dissolution of the order of the Humiliati, decreed by Pope Pius V in 1571, the nuns remained in the convent but embraced the Benedictine rule. With the suppressions of 1797, the nuns had to abandon the convent, which was converted into apartments, while the church was used as a warehouse until 1826, when it was reopened for worship and entrusted by Cardinal Luigi Lambruschini to the Evangelical Workers, who still officiate there today. In 1873, with the opening of Via Roma and Galleria Mazzini, the complex was completely surrounded by new buildings.

With the urban interventions for the construction of the business center of Piccapietra, the convent was almost completely demolished except for the chapter house, which housed from 1965 to 1996 the Franzoniana Library, which, after several relocations since 2008, has been housed in the seventeenth-century Mother of God complex.

==== Cloister of St. Andrew ====
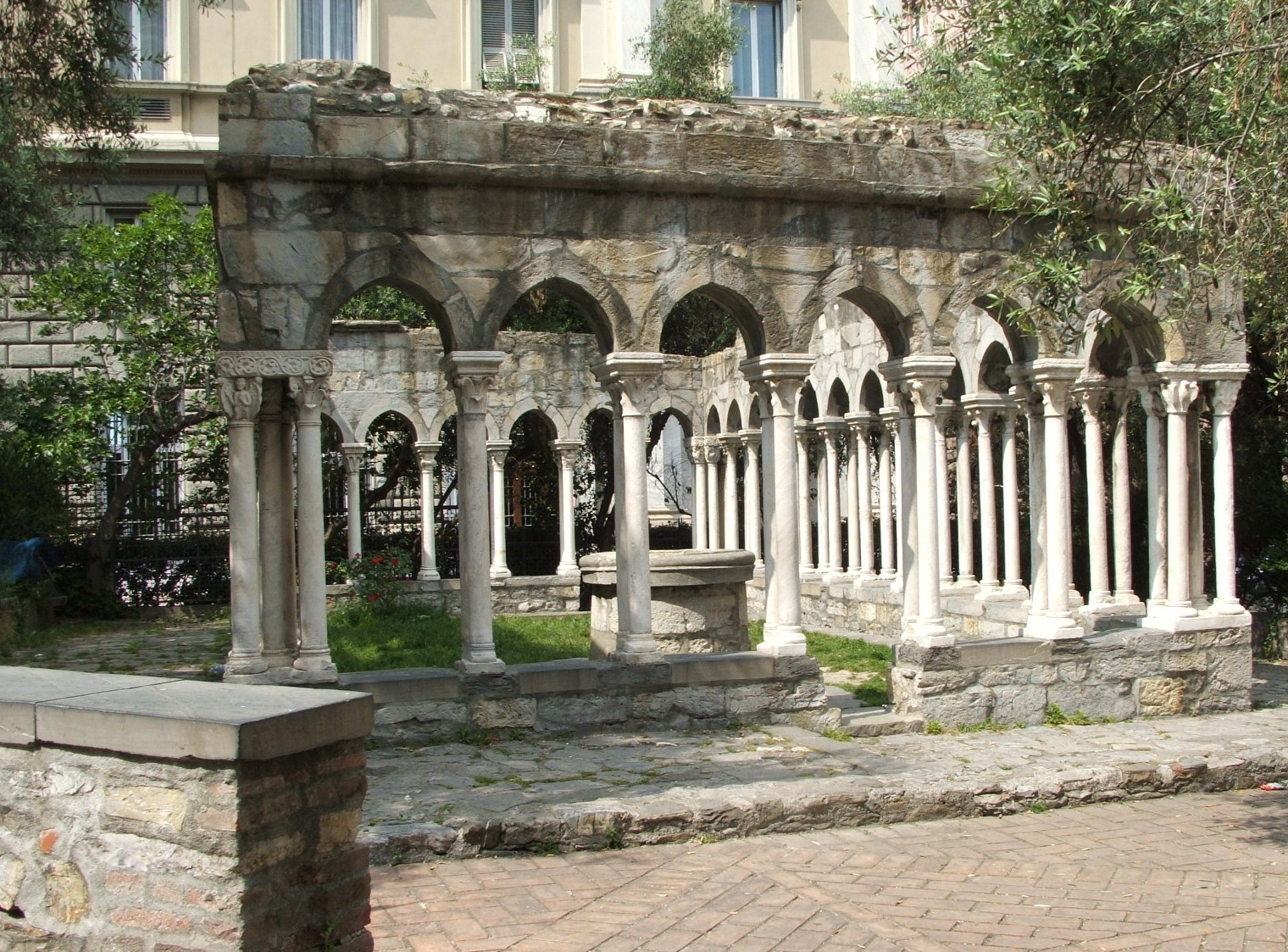
The cloister of St. Andrew

In a small green space next to the Columbus house, the cloister of the former monastery of St. Andrew, demolished in 1904, has been reassembled. In Romanesque style, dating from the 12th century, with a rectangular plan, the cloister consists of twin columns on the sides and in groups of six at the corners, with capitals adorned with phytomorphic and zoomorphic motifs; the elements that composed it, recovered by architect Alfredo d'Andrade, were placed on this site in 1924.

=== Military architecture ===
==== Walls ====
The district, as already mentioned, once outside the walls known as the Barbarossa walls (12th century), was later included within the 14th-century walls. What remains of the latter, later modified in the 16th century, delimits the present Portoria neighborhood from the S. Vincenzo area, while only the Porta Soprana remains of the older city walls.

- Barbarossa Walls (12th century). The Barbarossa walls, built in 1155, connected to the earlier city wall near the Soprana Gate (which was already part of the Carolingian-era city wall), then went up the hills of S. Andrea and Piccapietra to the San Germano (or Acquasola) gate, which was located where Corvetto Square is now. In this section opened the S. Egidio gate, demolished in the 17th century for the opening of Via Giulia, and the Porta Aurea (present-day Piccapietra square), the remains of which disappeared with the urban upheavals of the 1960s. The section of the walls still existing at the end of the 19th century on the S. Andrea hill disappeared instead in 1904 with the earthworks for the enlargement of Piazza De Ferrari.
- Sixteenth-century walls. The fourteenth-century city wall, later modified in the sixteenth century but maintaining the same route, includes the stretch from the Acquasola bastion to the Monumental Bridge. This stretch of wall, above which runs the present Corso A. Podestà, which bypasses Via XX Settembre passing over the Monumental Bridge, is still well preserved; there opened the gates of Acquasola (which disappeared with the construction of Piazza Corvetto), Olivella (also known as S. Caterina), still extant, which connected the village of Piccapietra, the heart of ancient Portoria, with S. Vincenzo through the Salita della Tosse, and finally the main one, the Porta degli Archi or S. Stefano gate, opened during the 16th-century renovation, which stood where the Monumental Bridge is today.

==== Porta Soprana ====
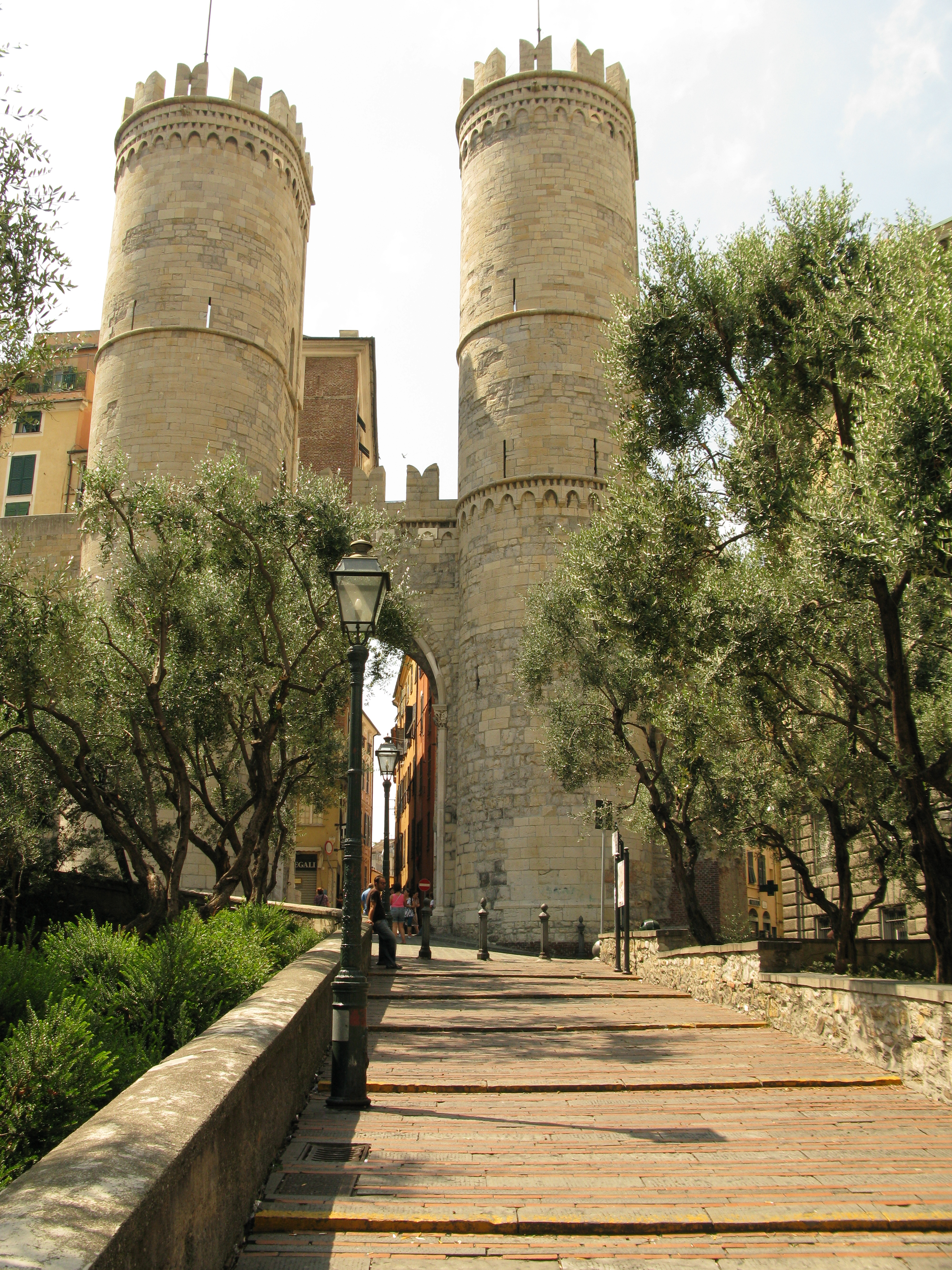
The towers of Porta Soprana

Located on the boundary between the Portoria and Molo districts, it faces Dante Square with its outer side. It was one of the main gates of the medieval city wall known as "del Barbarossa" and is located at the top of the Piano di Sant'Andrea. Already included in the earlier city walls, it was at that time restored in monumental form, with its two horseshoe-shaped towers. Beginning in the 14th century, when with the construction of a new outer wall the gate had lost its strategic importance, dwelling houses were built close to its towers. In the last decade of the 19th century the arch and the northern tower were restored by Alfredo d'Andrade, at that time director of the Superintendency of Fine Arts; in 1938 under the direction of Orlando Grosso the southern tower, which had until then remained incorporated into a civilian dwelling building, was also restored. The structure of the gate recalls that of Roman gates of the late Empire, with an ogival arch opening between two semi-cylindrical towers crowned with merlons.

==== Gate of the Arches (or of the Arch) ====
Built in 1539 to a design by Giovanni Maria Olgiati, it was decorated on the outer side with travertine Doric columns and surmounted by a statue of St. Stephen, made by Taddeo Carlone. In 1896, following the construction of Via XX Settembre and the construction of the Monumental Bridge, it was dismantled and rebuilt at the Mura del Prato, on Via R.Banderali, in the Carignano area. A plaque commemorates the relocation of the gate.

==== Porta dell'Olivella ====
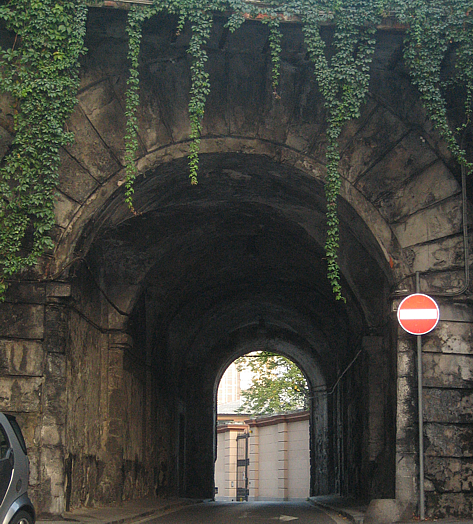
Olivella Gate

Porta dell'Olivella, near the church of Santo Stefano, was part of the 14th-century walls; with the 16th-century renovation, it was replaced by Porta dell'Arco and remained closed for a long time; it was reopened only around 1825, when the Acquasola Park was built. Near this gate, inside the walls, Christopher Columbus's father Domenico had lived in a house that was demolished in the late 15th century to build the Pammatone hospital and in which the famous navigator would be born in 1451.

== Infrastructure and transportation ==
=== Highways ===
The nearest highway exit is Genova-Est on the A12 Genoa-Livorno Highway, which is located in the Staglieno district, 5 km away.

=== Railways ===
Genova Brignole station is located about 1 km from Piazza De Ferrari.

=== Urban transportation ===
- Subway. The neighborhood is served by the De Ferrari station of the Genoa Metro, of which it was the eastern terminus until the opening of the Brignole station in December 2012. There is also the Corvetto station facility, located between the De Ferrari and Brignole stations and which was to be opened at the same time as the latter; however, some economic problems prompted the administrators to postpone its completion and subsequent opening until a date to be determined. At present (January 2022), the station structure is being used as a ventilation chamber for the line.
- Buses. Numerous AMT city bus lines head to Piazza De Ferrari or pass through the neighborhood, connecting it with Sampierdarena, the Levante, Val Bisagno, and the hilly areas above.

=== Airports ===
- Genoa Cristoforo Colombo Airport - 11 km.

=== Hospitals ===
- Galliera Hospital - approximately 1 km
- San Martino Hospital - 4 km.

== See also ==
- Carignano

== Bibliography ==
- Guida d'Italia - Liguria [Italy Guide - Liguria] (in Italian). Milano: TCI. 2009.
- Caraceni Poleggi, Fiorella (1984). Genova - Guida Sagep [Genoa - Sagep Guide] (in Italian). SAGEP Editrice - Automobile Club di Genova.
- Casalis, Goffredo (1840). Dizionario geografico, storico, statistico e commerciale degli stati di S.M. il Re di Sardegna [Geographical, historical, statistical and commercial dictionary of the states of HM the King of Sardinia] (in Italian). Torino: G. Maspero.
- Finauri, Stefano (2007). Forti di Genova: storia, tecnica e architettura dei fortini difensivi [Forts of Genoa: history, technique and architecture of defensive forts] (in Italian). Genova: Edizioni Servizi Editoriali. ISBN 978-88-89384-27-5.
