= Luigi Rovelli =

Italian architect (1850–1911)

- Born: 23 March 1850; Milan, Lombardy–Venetia, Austrian Empire
- Died: 1911 (aged 60–61); Rapallo, Liguria, Kingdom of Italy
- Occupation: Architect
- Known for: One of the leading figures of eclecticism in Liguria
- Notable work: Sanctuary of Our Lady of Montallegro, via XX Settembre, Palazzo Balbi Piovera Raggio

Luigi Rovelli (1850–1911) was an Italian architect, a key figure in the eclecticism movement in Liguria.

== Biography ==
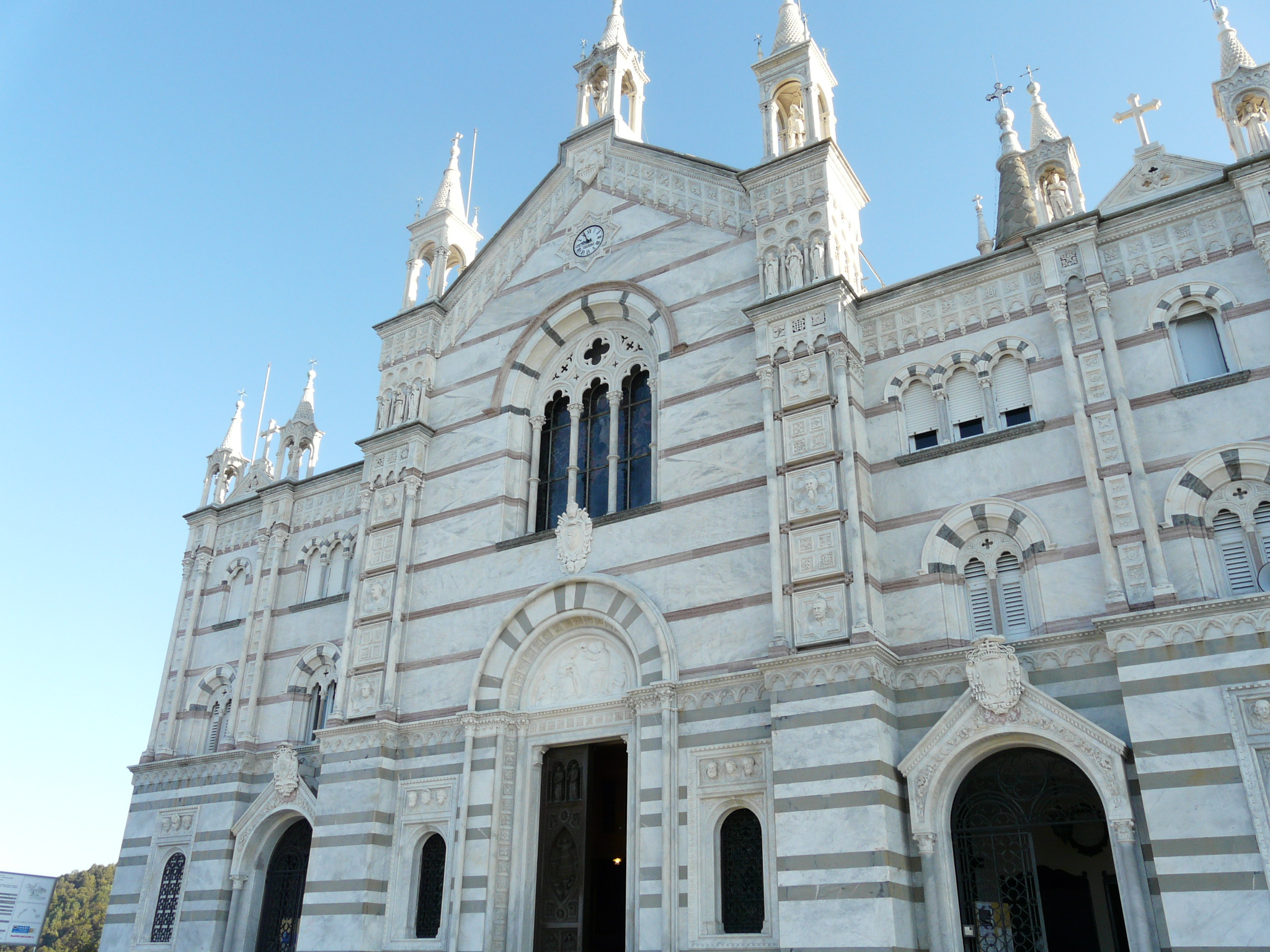
The facade of the Sanctuary of Our Lady of Montallegro in Rapallo, designed by Rovelli in 1896.

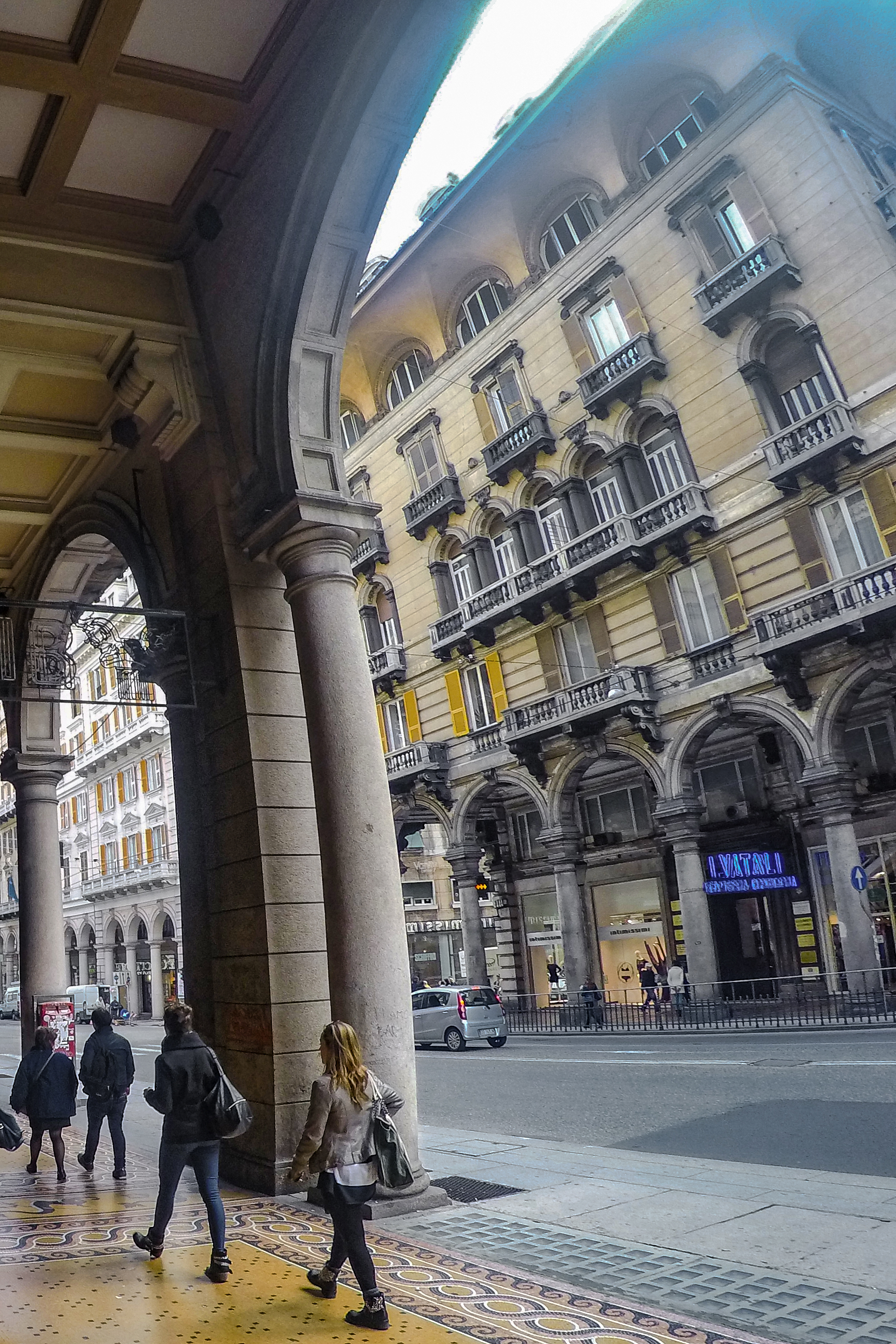
The building at 34 Via XX Settembre, in Genoa.

Luigi Rovelli was born in Monza on 23 March 1850. A student of Camillo Boito, he graduated from the Brera Academy. Following the career path of his uncle, Giuseppe Rovelli, who between 1860 and 1870 renovated the Villa Rossi Martini in Sestri Ponente, Villa Vivaldi Pasqua in Cornigliano, and the Villa Duchessa di Galliera in Voltri.

After moving to Liguria with his uncle, he quickly demonstrated his ability to meet the demands of the local nobility and bourgeoisie. In Arenzano, in 1885, he completely renovated the Villa Negrotto Cambiaso, altering its facades in a distinctly medieval style and adding several new structures and a new wall along the western pedestrian path via Vernazza. The building did not undergo any restoration until 2005, under the direction of architect Arcangelo Mazzella, who also restored the heraldic gallery on the facade, showcasing mainly the coats of arms of the Genoese patrician families and other allied and politically close families to the Pallavicini family. The villa in Arenzano is interesting as it includes a tower with foundations dating back to 1250.

Towards the end of the 19th century, Rovelli also undertook the restoration and expansion of the nearby Villa Figoli (1880). He is credited with designing the villas on the Montesano hill, behind the Genova Brignole railway station, as well as landscaping the garden and loggia of Villa Sauli in Carignano.

In the western part of the Riviera, he created what is considered his masterpiece, which was destroyed in 1951: the Raggio Castle in the former town of Cornigliano Ligure (1881).

In the hinterland of Voltri, near the Acquasanta thermal baths, he built a small Venetian Gothic-style villa commissioned by the Giudice family, later acquired by the Verrina family (1880).

Though he was an engineer, he was recognized as an architect due to the high quality of his works and realizations. Around this time, he was commissioned by the De Ferrari family to design a park and a neo-Gothic castle of significant artistic value on the Isola del Garda.

He then worked on numerous civil and religious buildings in Genoa, where he had his studio in Piazza della Meridiana, particularly in the city center, where other notable engineers and architects of the time also operated, including Gino Coppedè, Benvenuto Pesce Maineri, Giuseppe Cannovale, Cesare Gamba, Dario Carbone, Gaetano Orzali, Stefano Cuneo, Raffaele Croce, Giuseppe Tallero, G. B. Carpineti, the Celle brothers, and others. Among his works from this period are the building at number 34 on Via XX Settembre, the Palazzo Balbi Piovera Raggio on Via Balbi (1881), and the facade of the Sanctuary of Our Lady of Montallegro in Rapallo (1896). He also designed the monumental tomb of Armando Raggio (1895), known as the "Duomo di Milano", located in the Monumental Cemetery of Staglieno.

Rovelli also designed the Villa Pignone, located in the Multedo district, constructed towards the end of the 19th century.

Luigi Rovelli died in Rapallo in 1911. He was adept at interpreting the tastes of the local clientele, alternating between neo-Renaissance or neo-Baroque styles for urban buildings and neo-Gothic or neo-Romanesque forms, especially popular in villa residences.

He had a son, Antonio, who continued his career as an architect and designed the cantilevered loggia of Villa Mylius, overlooking the Fiera di Genova.

== Bibliography ==
- Matteo Frulio; Alberto Malaspina (2006). Villa Brignole Sale, Duchessa di Galliera. Sagep. ISBN 88-7058-961-7.
- Caterina Mandirola (2010). Parco di villa Negrotto Cambiaso ad Arenzano. Sagep. ISBN 9788863730258.
- Marcello Primo; Angela Maltoni (1996). Castello Raggio. Tra storia e memoria. Compagnia dei Librai. ISBN 9788886620147.
