= Giuseppe Cannovale =

Italian engineer (1864–1938)

- Born: Giuseppe Cannovale; 1864; Messina, Italy
- Died: 1938 (aged 73–74)
- Occupations: Engineer, Urban planner, Entrepreneur
- Era: 19th-20th century

Giuseppe Cannovale (1864–1938) was an Italian engineer, urban planner, and entrepreneur.

== Biography ==
=== Early life ===
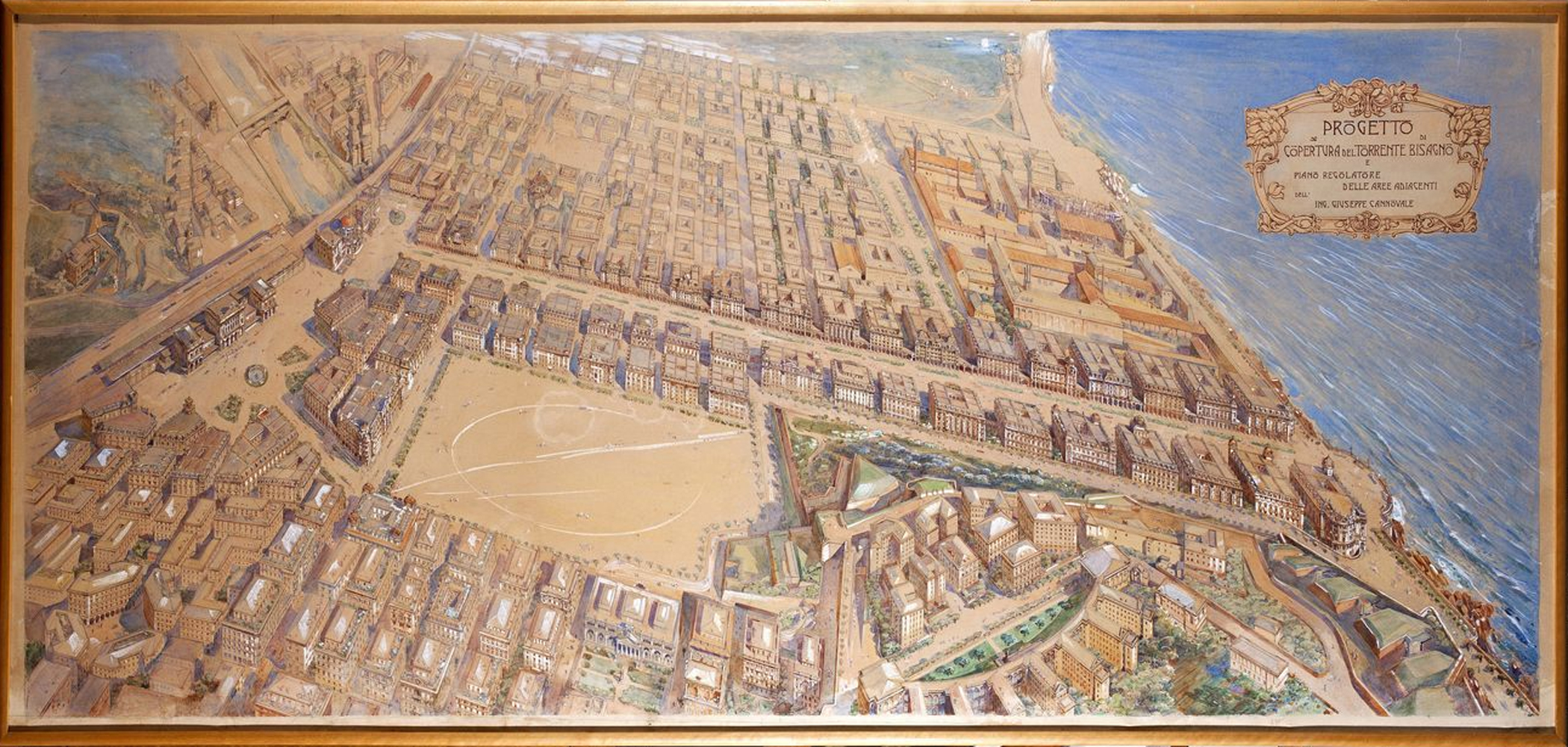
Project for covering the Bisagno river and zoning plan, Genoa, 1905; in the lower left, Via XX Settembre can be seen in its modern structure, with the Palazzo delle Cupole, piazza Colombo, and on the far opposite side, the large Ospedale Galliera

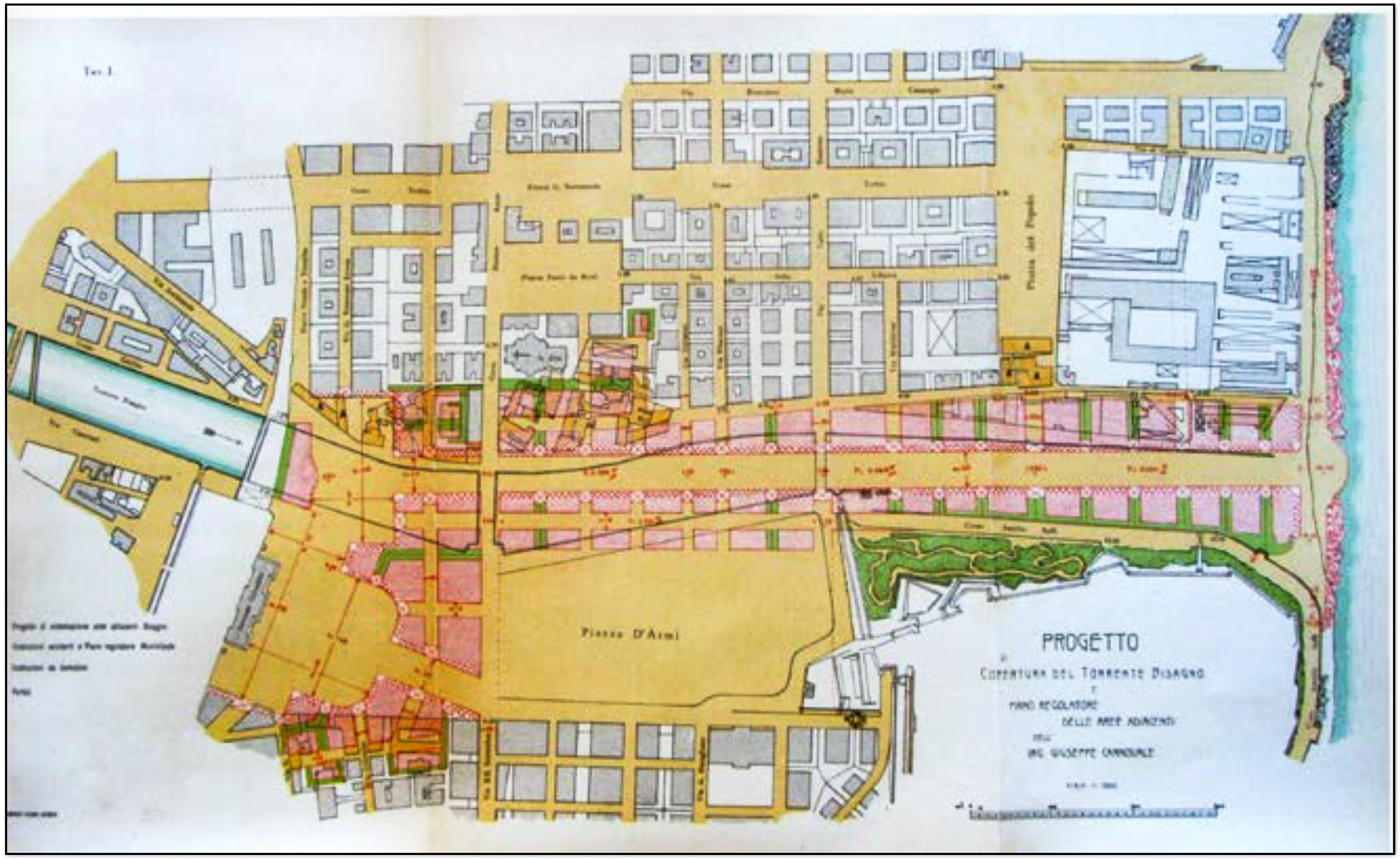
The zoning plan for the redevelopment of the areas adjacent to the Bisagno river

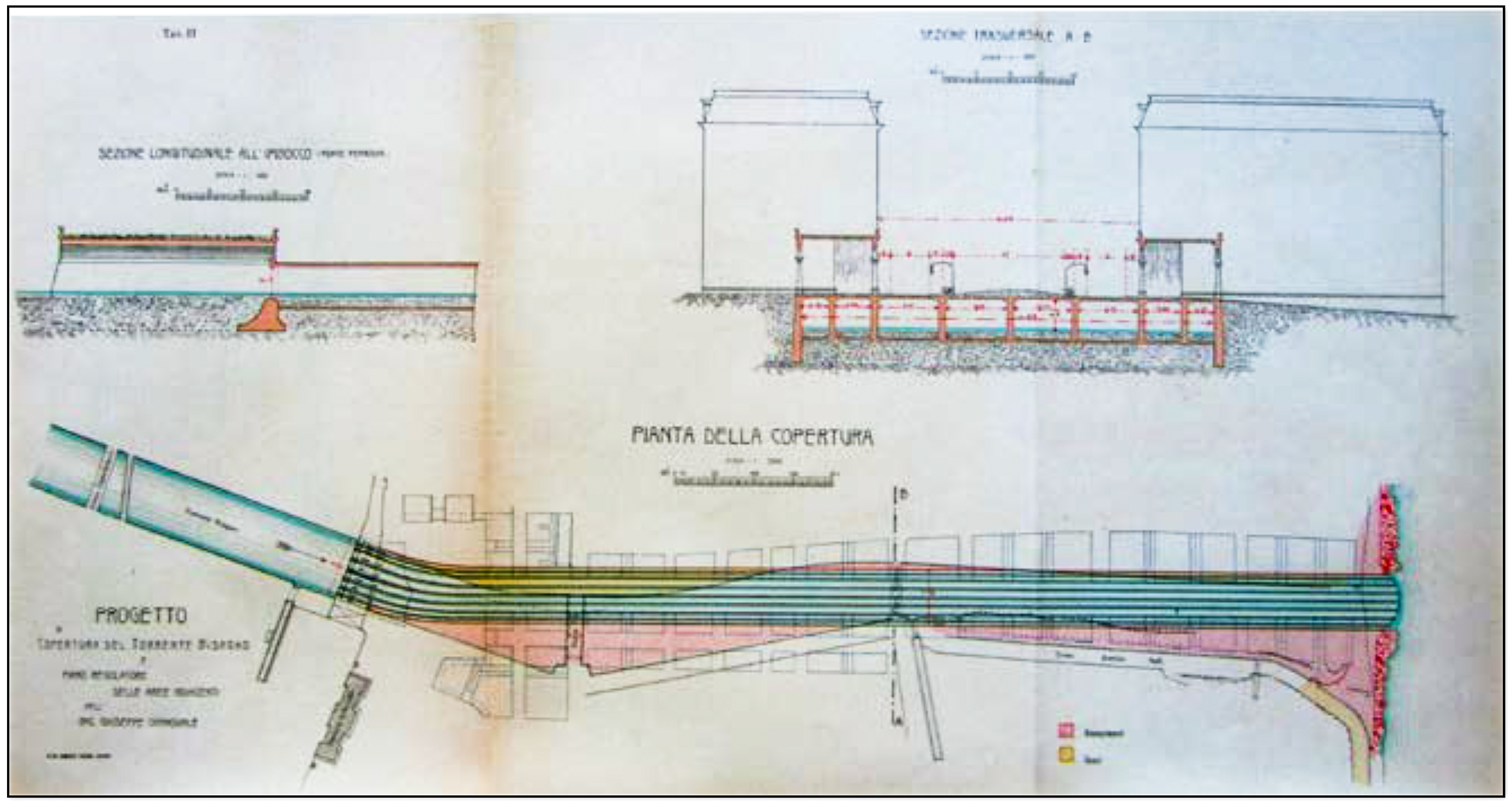
The technical project for covering the Bisagno river

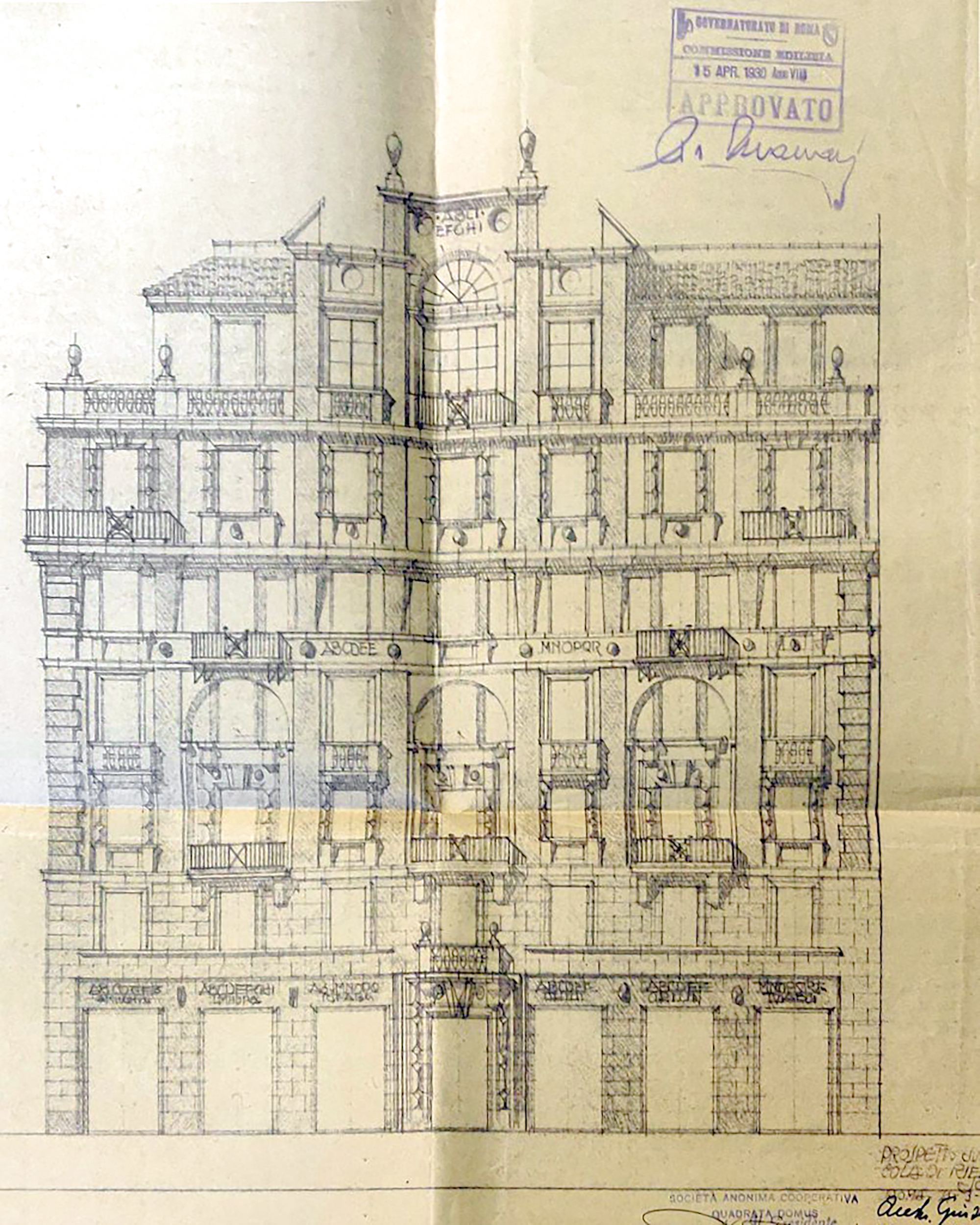
The project for Piazza Cola di Rienzo in Rome

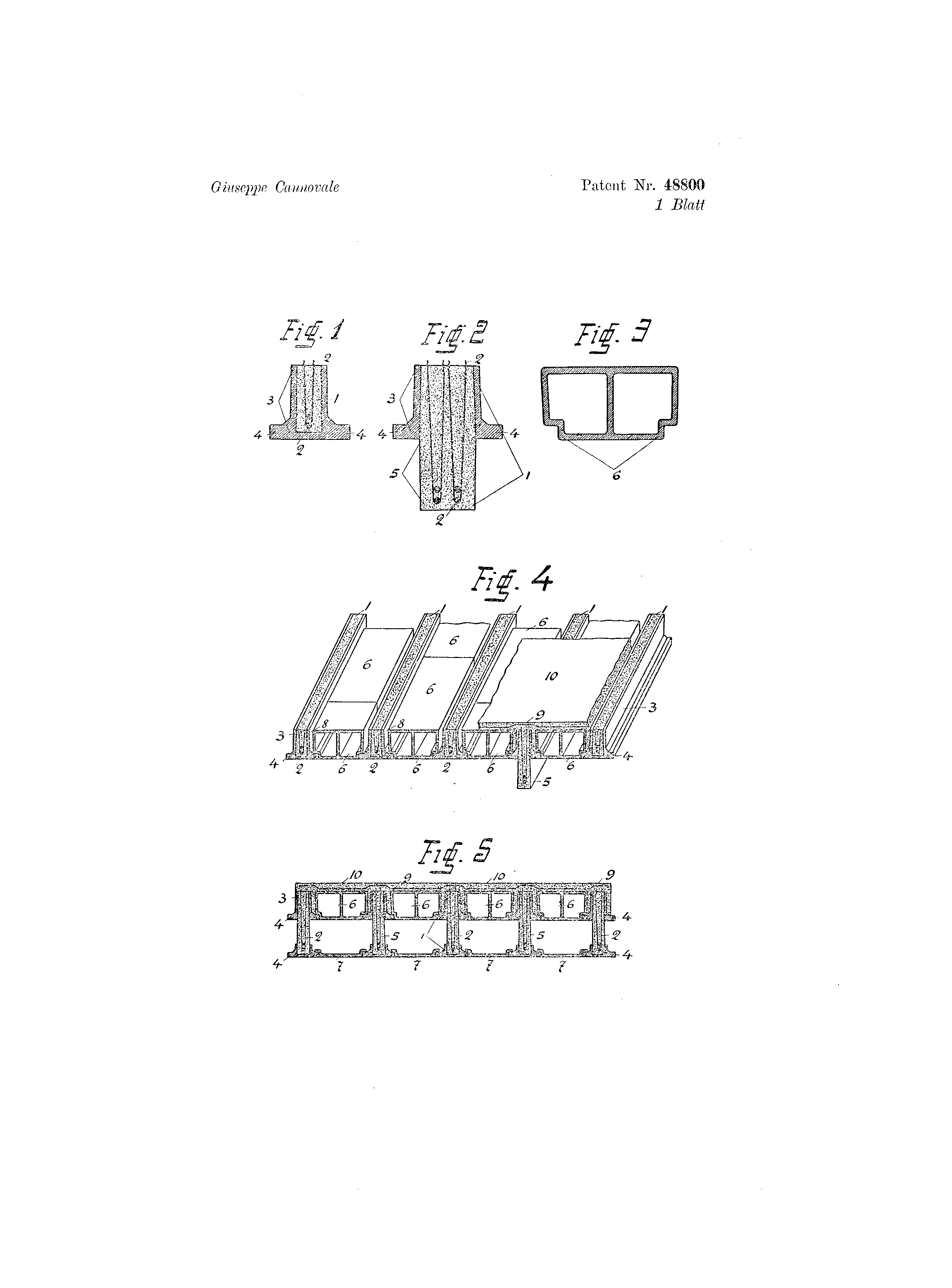
One of Cannovale's patents

Giuseppe Cannovale was born in Messina to Tommaso Cannovale. In 1884, he enrolled at the Royal School of Application for Engineers in Turin, becoming a civil engineer in 1889. In 1892, he competed to become an engineer for the Ministry of Finance, but did not place among the top twelve required.

By 1896, he had his own studio on Corso Vittorio Emanuele II in Turin, and later briefly moved to the province of Alessandria, in Tortona.

=== The success in Genoa ===
Cannovale found success after moving to Genoa in the early 20th century. He established his studio at via Frugoni 15, near via XX Settembre, where major urban development was taking place, involving prominent architects of the time such as Gino Coppedè, Luigi Rovelli, Benvenuto Pesce Maineri, Cesare Gamba, Dario Carbone, Gaetano Orzali, Stefano Cuneo, Raffaele Croce, Giuseppe Tallero, G. B. Carpineti, the Celle brothers, and others. Cannovale arrived in the Ligurian capital at a critical time for the city, as the layout was changing and large residential districts were emerging. The most significant transformation of the area, extending from the forecourt of the Genova Brignole railway station to Corso Italia, was the covering of the Bisagno river and the zoning plan for the adjacent areas. The works were long debated and finally approved in 1919, and completed in 1930. Among the studies used for the intervention were those by Cannovale, the first to be presented, as well as by Pesce-Maineri (the one approved with modifications), Renzo Picasso, Gaetano Orzali, and others.

Significant, especially from a historical perspective, were the studies conducted by Cannovale regarding the Bisagno river. In particular, between 1905 and 1907, he studied and measured the correct maximum flow of the river in case of floods, and proposed specific engineering projects that, if implemented, would have prevented the many catastrophic floods that occurred in Genoa throughout the following century, as was evident only in the 2000s.

=== The company's expansion across Italy ===
He then dedicated himself particularly to civil engineering and technical-industrial innovation. At the beginning of the century, modern engineering technology was in its infancy, with numerous innovations emerging, the most important of which was the Hennebique system, or reinforced concrete. Cannovale began conceiving his projects with an entrepreneurial approach, becoming the exclusive licensee for Italy of the Wayss & Freytag cement production system, one of the first in the history of modern concrete construction.

Cannovale patented a "new system of reinforced concrete constructions with air chambers" in 1906 and later a "new Cannovale Monolithic Floor System with air chambers," which spread and brought him success. This system was used, for example, in the construction of the Provincial Marine Hospice in Rimini. In 1909, Cannovale obtained a patent for a reinforced concrete roof structure.

Within a few years, he expanded his studio founded in Genoa, opening branches in major Italian cities such as Genoa, Milan, Rome, and Bologna, with industrialist Ernesto Dellepiane of Pontedecimo, establishing itself as one of the first companies specialized in reinforced concrete construction in Italy. In the following years, his company designed over 600 projects for a value of over twenty million lire, dealing with the supply of frameworks and design for dams, bridges, basins, gasometers, and other structures for the Italian State Railways, ministries, public and private entities.

Cannovale always alternated his entrepreneurial activity with design work. In 1908, he designed the distillery of Pontelagoscuro in Ferrara. In 1910, he was the author of the renowned Teatro Eden in Genoa, the so-called "best known and most frequented among the variety venues", inaugurated in 1910 and built in the Louis XV style. Attached to the theater was also a restaurant. Between 1919 and 1921, he carried out appraisals and was involved in the design of the Piero Gaslini Professional Institute in the municipality of Bolzaneto.

=== Relocation to Rome ===
In the late twenties, with the increase in commissions, he moved to Rome, dealing with civil engineering but also urban planning, proposing, for example, a redevelopment project for the block between Piazza Cola di Rienzo and Via Valadier (with parts that received the favorable opinion of the building commission but were then ignored during construction).

From the mid-thirties, he was appointed president of STIG (Tolfetana Industrial Gypsum Company), headquartered on Lungotevere dei Mellini, while his engineering studio was located in central Piazza Cola di Rienzo, in the Prati rione. Even in his old age, he continued to seek new engineering solutions, patenting in 1938 with engineer Angelo Illario a type of "mixed reinforced concrete and brickwork flooring consisting of tubular beams manufactured off-site."

For his merits in the engineering and industrial field, in 1931 King Victor Emmanuel III appointed him an officer, and in 1933 a commander, while in the early 1910s he had been appointed a knight.

He died in 1938, leaving some testamentary bequests in Naples.

== Honors ==
- Knight of the Order of the Crown of Italy.
- Officer of the Order of the Crown of Italy, 18 April 1931.
- Commander of the Order of the Crown of Italy, 9 November 1933.

== Books ==
- Cannovale, Giuseppe (1894). La scienza dell'ingegnere applicata. Torino: Augusto Federico Negro Tip. Edit.
- Cannovale, Giuseppe; Credazzi, Gustavo (1897). Progetto di Aula parlamentare nel palazzo di Montecitorio. Voghera: Stabilimento tipografico Gatti-Rossi-De Foresta Succ. G. Gatti.
- Cannovale, Giuseppe (1905). Progetto del torrente Bisagno e Piano Regolatore delle aree adiacenti. Genova: Pagano.

== Bibliography ==
- Cevini, Paolo. Genova anni '30. Da Labò a Daneri. 1989. Sagep. ISBN 9788870583236, p. 138.
- Bernardi, Luigi. Memoria sulle prove di carico di un solaio in cemento armato a camera d'aria (sistema Cannovale). Bologna: Stab. tipografico Emiliano, 1912.
