= Cesare Gamba =

Italian engineer (1851–1927)

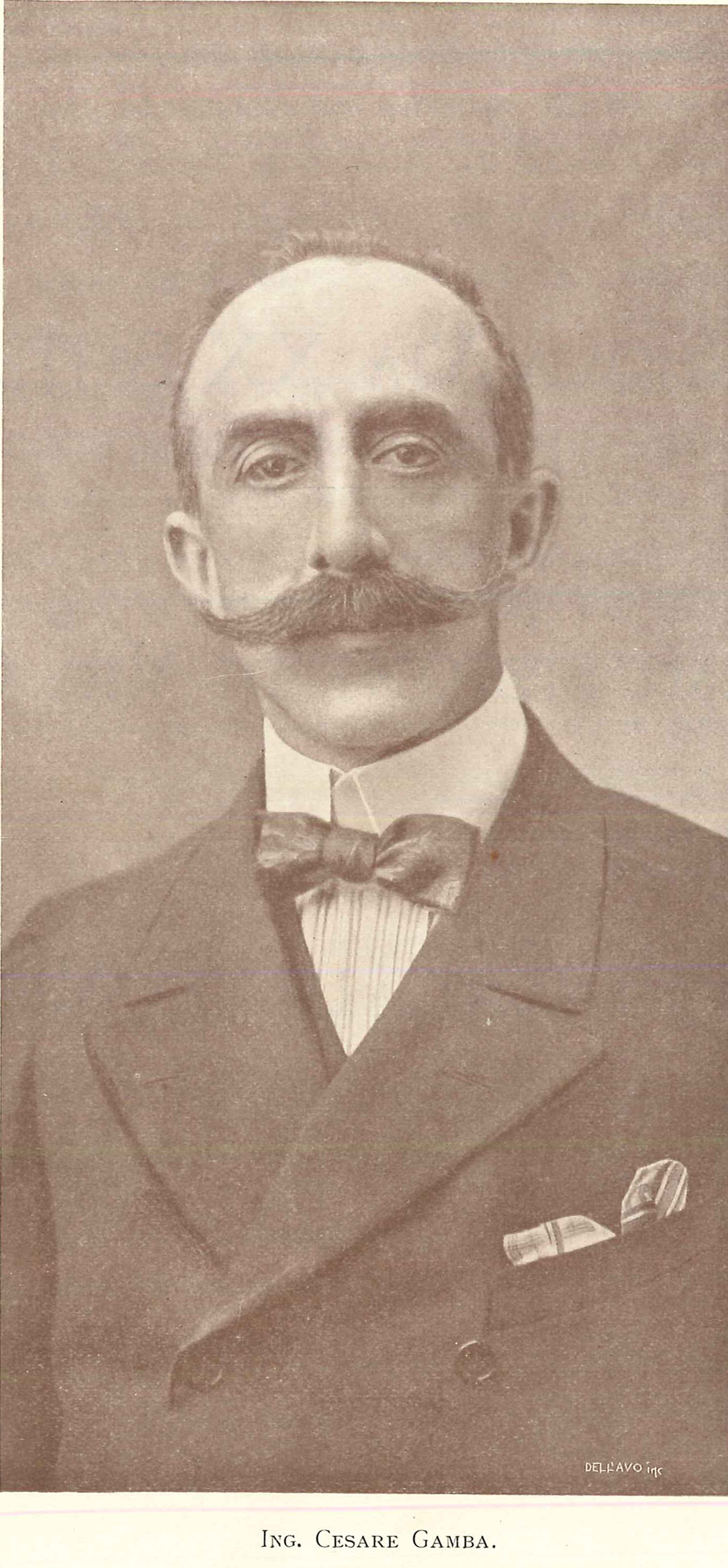
- Born: June 17, 1851; Genoa, Italy
- Died: August 19, 1927 (aged 76); Genoa, Italy
- Occupations: Engineer, Architect, Urban Planner

Cesare Gamba (1851 – 1927) was an Italian engineer, urban planner, and entrepreneur.

== Biography ==
Cesare Gamba was born in Genoa on June 17, 1851. A multifaceted figure, Gamba was a cultured man, politically engaged, a lover and scholar of foreign languages, and a devotee of various artistic interests. His passion for music and theater led him to meet the most famous artists and musicians of the time, from Eleonora Duse to Sarah Bernhardt. A mountain enthusiast, he was among the first to reach the summit of Mont Blanc.

Graduating in civil engineering and architecture from the Royal School of Application for Engineers of Turin, he began working at the technical office of the Genoese engineer Cesare Parodi. These were years of "fruitful technical initiation" for him, in which, although very young, he had the opportunity to collaborate on important projects including that for the Galliera Hospital.

He set up his office at piazza Corvetto and his residence on Via Montesano, Genoa, where he designed his own villa. Cesare Gamba's professional figure is mostly linked to the construction of Via XX Settembre in Genoa, a vast urban operation that saw him as an undisputed skilled protagonist in various aspects of the intervention (including Gino Coppedè, Benvenuto Pesce Maineri, Giuseppe Cannovale, Luigi Rovelli, Dario Carbone, Gaetano Orzali, Stefano Cuneo, Raffaele Croce, Giuseppe Tallero, G. B. Carpineti, the Celle brothers, and others): from financial to technical and design aspects. The creation of a new road axis and the consequent arrangement of Piazza De Ferrari, the construction of the Monumental Bridge, and the connection between the Carignano area and that of the Acquasola, were the main interventions planned by the great urban transformation operation entrusted to engineer Gamba.

He also conducted numerous studies during this period concerning city traffic (1914), the residential plan for the Albaro area (1900 - 1903), and the study for the industrial port of Sestri Ponente (1917). He is also responsible for the design and construction of the Palazzo della Navigazione Generale Italiana, completed in 1924 and later known as the Palazzo della Regione Liguria.

Cesare Gamba died in Genoa on August 19, 1927. His wife Anna Cabella, in the plaque she had engraved at the Monumental Cemetery of Staglieno, remembered him with this inscription: "engineer, architect, rebuilder of his Genoa, artist, musician, high intellect and noble spirit, he preserved the heritage of integrity entrusted to him by his parents."

== Books ==
- Cesare Gamba (1885). Variante al progetto di sterramento e sistemazione di Piccapietra e S. Andrea. Genoa: Tipografia Marittima.
- Cesare Gamba (1885). Progetto di sterramento e sistemazione di Piccapietra e S. Andrea. Genoa: Tipografia Marittima.
- Cesare Gamba (1886). Esposizione del progetto relativo a via Giulia e spianamento del colle di Piccapietra.
- Cesare Gamba (1911). Note sul piano regolatore delle zone di Piccapietra e Pammatone. Genoa: Stabilimento tipo-litografico Pietro Pellas.
- Cesare Gamba (1914). Sulla viabilità del centro di Genova. Osservazioni e proposte. Genoa: Armanino.
- Cesare Gamba (1915). La cupola di Sant'Ambrogio e Piazza De Ferrari. S.L.A.G.
- Cesare Gamba (1917). Sulla questione della cupola di Sant'Ambrogio.
- Cesare Gamba (1924). Progetto di sterramento e sistemazione di Piccapietra dell'ing. C. Gamba. Genoa: Tipografia Sordomuti.
- Cesare Gamba (1926). Ricordi, confessioni, rimpianti. manuscript.

== Blibliography ==
- Genova nuova. Genoa: Premiati Stabilimenti Cromo - Tipografici A.E. Bacigalupi. 1902.
- S. Cuneo (1911). Progetto di strada centrale in Genova, da piazza De Ferrari a piazza Annunziata. Sventramenti. Modifiche alla via Balbi. Strada ad essa sussidiaria. Nuovo mercato. Linee di tram sotterranee. Genoa: Società tipo-litografica ligure E. Oliveti & C.
- Arturo Pettorelli (1914). Ancora di piazza De-Ferrari a Genova. Genoa: Tipografia Carlini.
- Francesca Podestà (2006). Cesare Gamba (1851 - 1927): Composizione e mimesi dell'architettura. Genoa: University of Genoa.
