= Bufalo =

Bufalo can refer to:

== People ==
- Gaspare del Bufalo, Catholic priest
- Nicholas Bufalo, Australian actor and director

== Weapons ==
- Bufalo pistol made by Llama firearms
- DN-V Bufalo, a Mexican howitzer tank

== Other uses ==
- Bufalo Bill, an album of Italian music
- Ciego de Avila (basketball), a Cuban basketball team nicknamed "Búfalos"

== See also ==
- Buffalo (disambiguation)
- Bufalino (disambiguation)
- Buffalo Bill (disambiguation)
- Bufalos
