= Bufalini (surname) =

Bufalini is an Italian surname. Notable people with the surname include:

- Francesco Antonio Bufalini, Italian draftsman, copper plate engraver and architect
- Giovanni Ottavio Bufalini (1709–1782), Italian cardinal
- Maurizio Bufalini (1787–1875), Italian physician
- Sauro Bufalini (1941–2012), Italian basketball player
- Ventura Bufalini (died 1504), Italian Roman Catholic prelate, Bishop of Terni and Città di Castello
