= Benvenuto Pesce Maineri =

Italian architect and engineer

Benvenuto Francesco Pesce Maineri
- Born: 1865; Genoa, Italy
- Died: 1935 (aged 69–70); Genoa, Italy
- Occupations: Architect, Engineer, Urban Planner
- Notable work: Palazzo at via XX Settembre 26, Palazzo at via XX Settembre 36, Workers' housing in Staglieno

Benvenuto Francesco Pesce Maineri (Genoa, 1865 – Genoa, 1935) was an Italian architect, engineer, and urban planner, known for his contributions to the Art Nouveau and Eclecticism styles in Italy during the late 19th and early 20th centuries.

== Biography ==
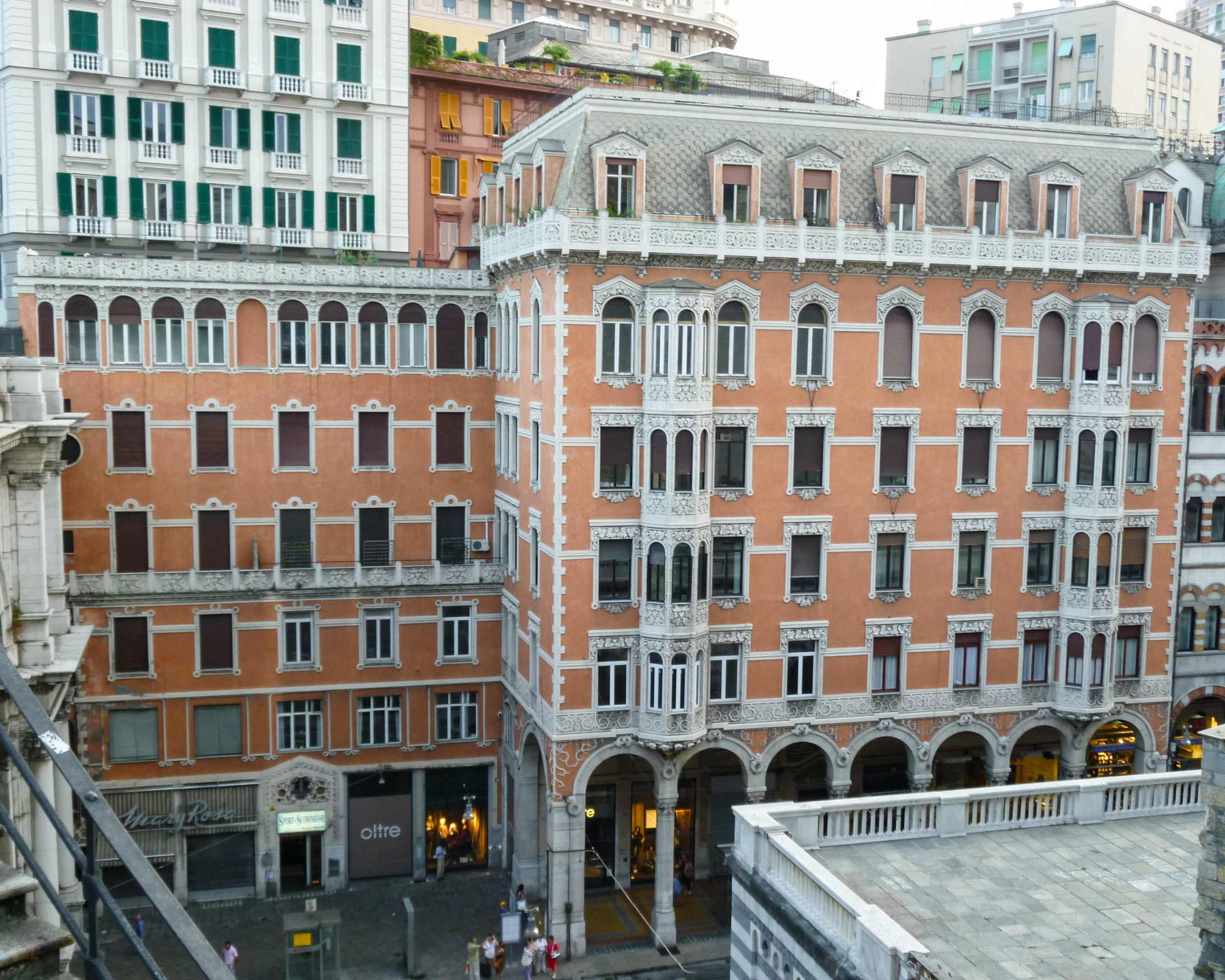
Palazzo at Via XX Settembre, No. 26, designed by Pesce-Maineri

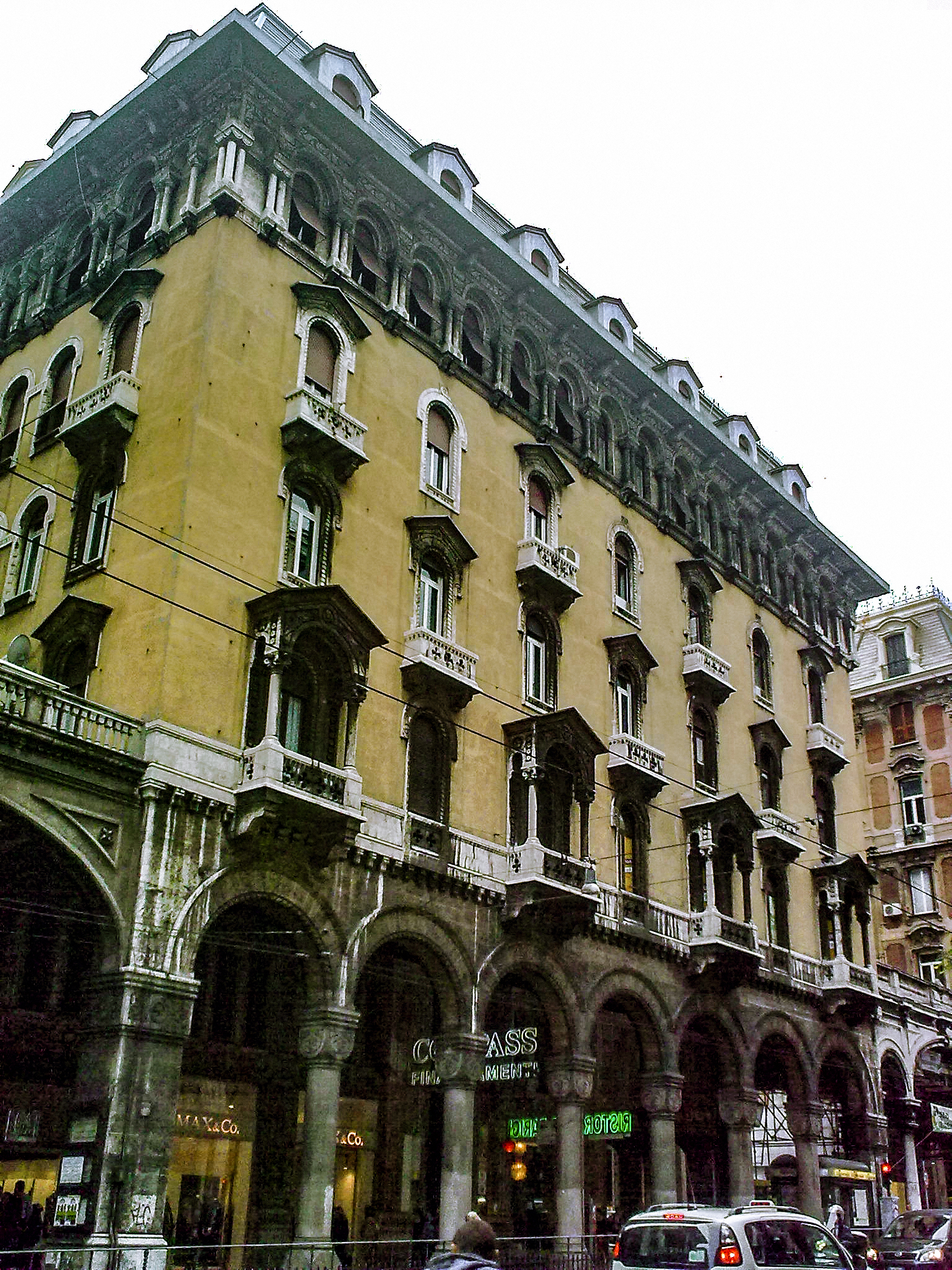
Palazzo at No. 36, Via XX Settembre, another work by Pesce-Maineri

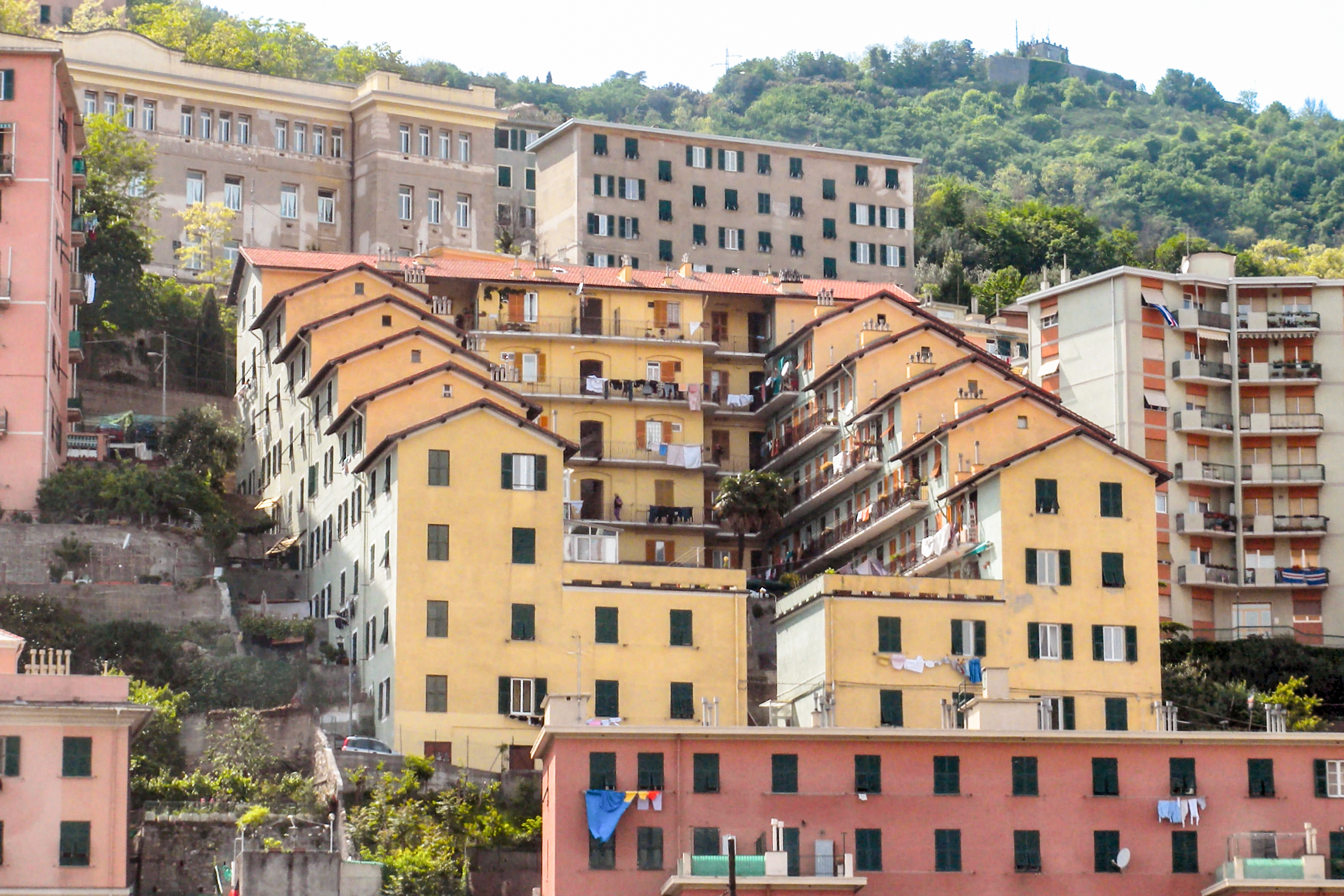
Workers' housing by the "Società L’Economica", in the Staglieno district

Benvenuto Francesco Pesce-Maineri was born in Genoa in 1865. He studied at the Royal Polytechnic of Milan, graduating in 1897. Engineer, architect, and professor, he had his studio at the central via XX Settembre 5-7 and, later, in Cornigliano, an elegant district with noble buildings, in Via Tonale and then at his own residence in Via Edomondo De Amicis 19. At the end of the nineteenth century, he was also active in journalism, writing for the monthly magazine L'edilizia moderna (Milan) by Luca Beltrami, for Il Monitore Tecnico by Achille Manfredini, and for the magazine Arte italiana decorativa e industriale by Camillo Boito. Since 1896, he became a member of the Società ligure di storia patria. In 1903, he married Maria at the Sanctuary of Our Lady of Grace in Tagliolo.

Pesce Maineri operated in the Ligurian capital at an important moment for the city when its layout was changing and large and relevant residential neighborhoods were emerging. He was mainly involved in the renewal of via XX Settembre, a street conceived following the dismantling of the ancient Via Giulia, designing some important buildings. As a member of the Società ligure di storia patria, he designed the building at civic number 36, inspired by Venetian architecture, and that at civic number 26, a palace with maritime thematization with rich aquatic decoration and the colors, red and white, of the flag of Genoa. In 1904, he designed in the Staglieno district the building of the Workers' housing by the Società L'Economica, commissioned by Gustavo Dufour, completed around 1907, a company that dealt with the construction of many popular buildings in the capital.

He also worked on the major urban revolutions that, starting from the lower part of via XX Settembre, which opens onto the area in front of the Genova Brignole railway station and the Bisagno river, reached Corso Italia. For twenty years, from 1897 to 1917, he proposed a long series of projects for the redevelopment of the area and the burial of the stream, until the approval of the 1917 project by the city council. The most significant transformation of this urban area, namely the covering of the Bisagno and the regulatory plan of the adjacent areas, was finally resolved in 1919 and completed in 1930. Among the most significant studies used for the implementation of the intervention was that of Benvenuto Pesce Maineri, as well as Gaetano Orzali, Renzo Picasso, Giuseppe Cannovale, and others. In Venice, he proposed to the council an extensive project for the complete urbanization of the Sant'Elena island. He also designed the plan for a basilica "Salvator Mundi in memoriam Cristofori Columbi inanuensis", which was supposed to be built near the Scalinata delle Caravelle in the area called "spianata Bisagno", in what would later become Piazza della Vittoria, in Genoa.

As a Dominican tertiary, in Savona, he drafted the project for the redevelopment of the municipal cemetery. He was also the designer of the Castello di Quassolo, in Carcare.

He was an esteemed academician at the Accademia Ligustica di Belle Arti for the architecture class.

In his old age, he was part of the diocesan commission for sacred art with other known architects of the time like Lorenzo Basso. He died in Genoa in 1935.

== Style ==
Benvenuto Pesce's style reflects the eclecticism typical of the late 19th and early 20th centuries. In his works, the theme of water recurs as almost a personal signature, becoming an integral part of the architecture itself. For example, the building at civic number 36 of via XX Settembre in Genoa, characterized by Venetian style, has an aquatic component linked to the lagoon and marsh environment: the decorations of the building mainly feature intricate river vegetation, carp, and water birds.

Civic number 26, characterized by a more mature and less academic style, has the sea water as its main theme: spiral algae motifs repeated on the facade and as a constituent element of the anterids, Leviathans that become finishing elements of the arches and uprights of the internal railings, dolphins, and mythological motifs: what distinguishes the building is above all the large bas-relief of the god Neptune adorning the upper part of the entrance door. Pesce also favored the use of warm colors, as well as the frequent reference to the white-red combination, probably a reference to the color of the Genoa flag.

== Notable works ==
- Palazzo at via XX Settembre 26, Genoa
- Palazzo at via XX Settembre 36, Genoa
- Workers' housing in Staglieno, Genoa

== Books ==
- Benvenuto Pesce Maineri (1898). Per la chiesa di S. Leone. Fratelli Armanino.
- Benvenuto Pesce Maineri (1905). Proposte al comune di Genova per una strada sul Torrente bisagno dal Ponte della ferrovia al Mare e piano regolatore delle regioni adiacenti. Genoa: Tip. Armanino.
- Benvenuto Pesce Maineri (1911). Relazione al progetto e compromesso per la sistemazione edilizia ed il popolamento dell'isola e sacca di S. Elena, da sottoporsi all'approvazione del Consiglio comunale di Venezia. Venice: Tip. G. Scarabellin.
- Benvenuto Pesce Maineri (1917). Relazione del sotto-comitato per l'insegnamento professionale artistico. Genoa: G. B. Marsano.
