= Bufalino =

Bufalino may refer to:

- Bufalino (surname), an Italian and American surname
- Bufalino crime family, an Italian-American Mafia crime family

== See also ==
- Bufalini (disambiguation)
- Bufalo (disambiguation)
