= Bufalini =

Bufalini may refer to:

- Bufalini (surname), an Italian surname
- Bufalini Chapel, chapel of the church of Santa Maria in Aracoeli, Rome, Italy
- Castello Bufalini, castle-residence outside of the town of San Giustino, Umbria, Italy

== See also ==
- Bufalino (disambiguation)
- Bufali
