= Gaetano Orzali =

Italian engineer and architect (1873–1954)

- Born: 5 March 1873; Lucca
- Died: 1954 (aged 80–81); Genoa
- Occupations: Engineer, architect
- Era: 19th and 20th centuries
- Children: Alessandro Orzali

Gaetano Orzali (Lucca, 1873 – Genoa, 1954) was an Italian engineer and architect, a significant figure in the Art Nouveau style.

== Biography ==
=== Early life ===
Gaetano Orzali was born in Lucca, in the Giannotti district, in 1873, to Modesto Orzali (1851-1931), a builder and contractor. He was the most renowned member of a family of significant builders, including his father (the designer of buildings such as Villa Orzali, Villa Berrettini, Chalet Martini, and the Martini store) and his uncle Achille (Villa Lazzeroni, palaces Landucci and Lipparelli, Simi building), who significantly contributed to the urban renewal of Lucca between the 19th and 20th centuries.

After his studies and graduation in civil engineering and architecture in 1895 from the Royal School of Engineers in Rome (which was later merged into the Sapienza University of Rome), Orzali also graduated from the Accademia di Belle Arti di Firenze in 1897. In 1896, while still a student at the Academy, he worked at Palazzo Vitelleschi in Tarquinia, participating in the surveys of the entrance door. Growing up in the shadow of a strong Tuscan tradition, he became one of the most prominent representatives of the Art Nouveau style, occasionally incorporating his personal taste influenced by Renaissance classical architecture. He also served as a lieutenant of the Engineering Corps in the Royal Italian Army.

=== Lucca ===
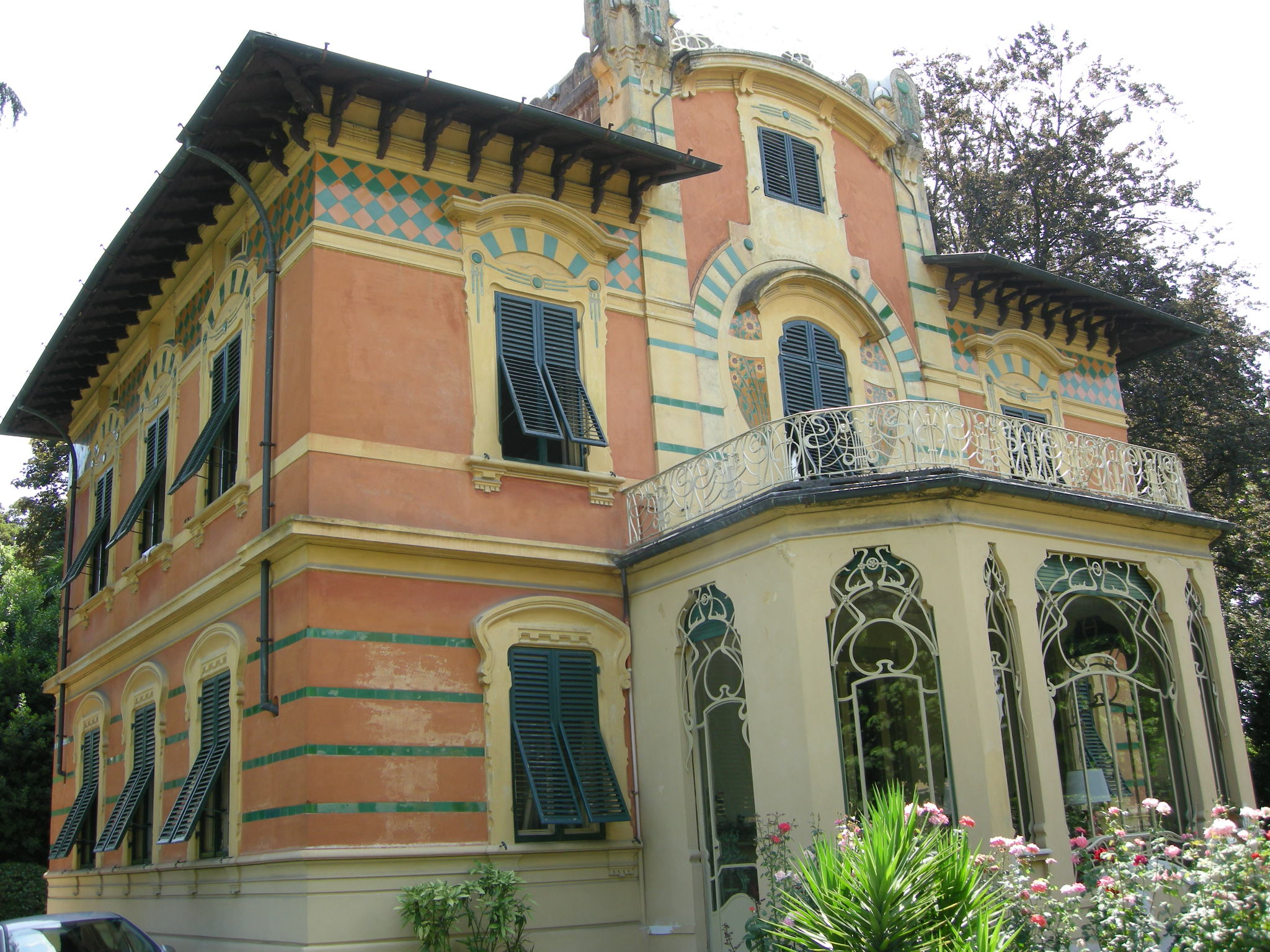
Villa Ducloz in Lucca

Orzali initially practiced his profession in his hometown. One of his earliest known projects was the construction of the Church of San Martino in Freddana in Pescaglia, in the province of Lucca, built between 1897 and 1904 in a lively eclectic style. In Lucca, he designed the Brancoli Tower, a monumental cross-monument built in 1900, over 18 meters high, inaugurated on 13 October 1901 (later destroyed by retreating German troops during World War II in July 1944 and subsequently restored).

In 1900, he attempted to become a professor of elementary and geometric drawing at the Royal Institute of Fine Arts in Lucca, applying for the competition in April 1900. Although he was "considered" in the final selection, he was ultimately not selected.

=== Genoa ===
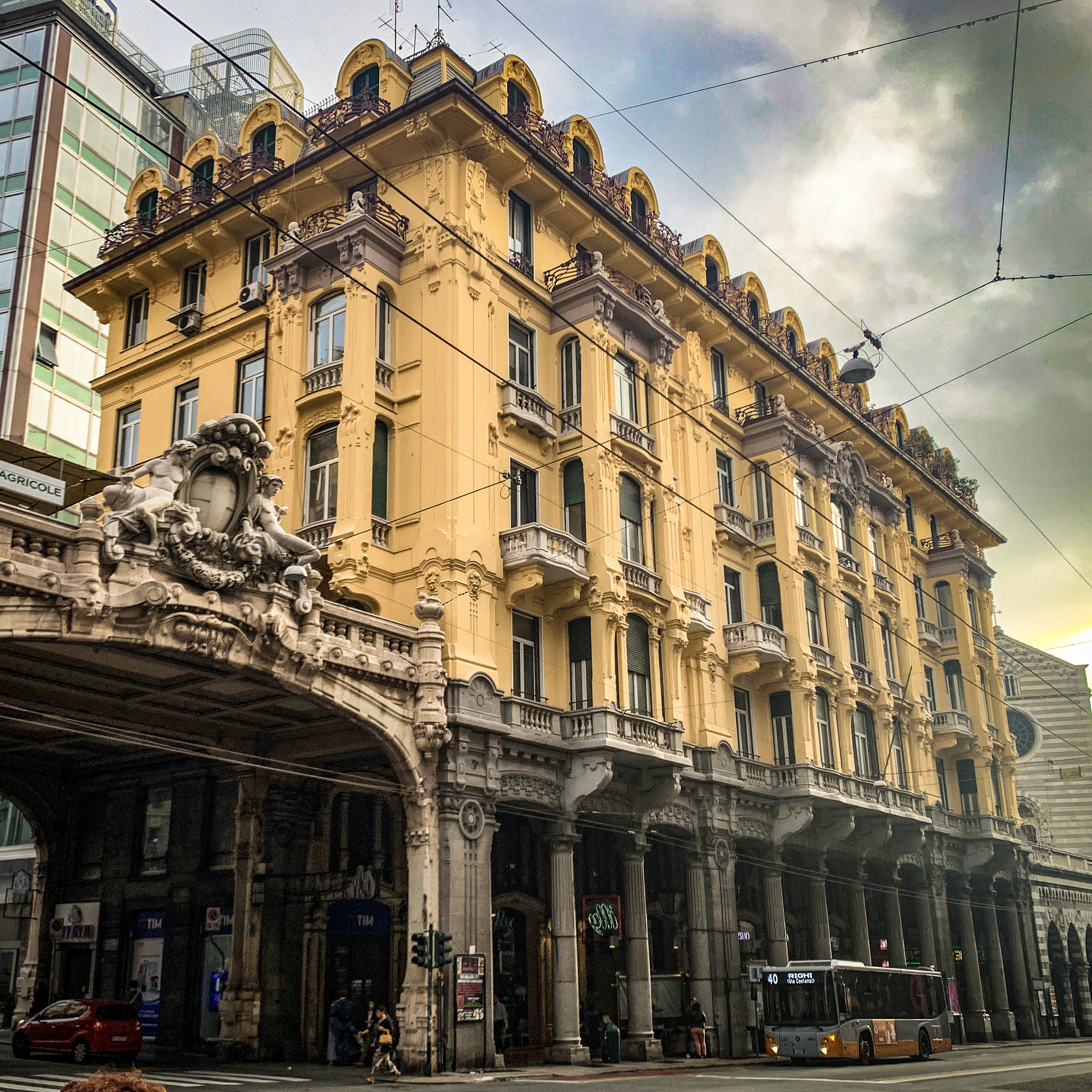
Palazzo Orzali in via XX Settembre, Genoa

Orzali then moved to Genoa permanently at the age of 29 in 1902. It was here that Orzali conducted his primary activities and became famous. He set up his studio at Via Archimede 21, in an area near Genova Brignole railway station, where significant urban transformations were underway. He arrived in the Ligurian capital at a crucial time when the city's landscape was changing, and large and important residential neighborhoods were emerging. He was involved in projects for the Croce family, but he was especially notable for the renewal of Via XX Settembre, designing the monumental Palazzo Orzali (1905) in front of the Church of Santo Stefano, at number 29 of the new main street in Genoa, just a few meters from the Monumental Bridge, near which he also had his studio for a period. He also designed the splendid monumental arch at the intersection of Via XX Settembre and Via Portoria in 1909 (later Via V Dicembre).

Orzali also designed major urban transformations that extended from the lower part of the street, which opens onto the area in front of Genova Brignole station and the Bisagno River, reaching Corso Italia and Molo Giano. The most significant transformation of this urban area, namely the covering of the Bisagno River and the master plan of the adjacent areas, was approved in 1919 and completed in 1930. The preliminary studies used for the implementation of the intervention included those by Orzali, Benvenuto Pesce Maineri, Renzo Picasso, Giuseppe Cannovale, and others.

"thanks to the initiative of an esteemed professional from Genoa, the architect Gaetano Orzali, [is in progress] a study precisely aimed at the urban development of the city in the lower Bisagno valley and its expansion towards the sea, along the entire beach and the adjacent aquatic area between Molo Giano and Punta del Vagno"

— Atti della Società italiana per il progresso delle scienze, 1913

In Genoa, Orzali was also the designer of many elegant residential architectures, such as the famous Villa Lavarello on Via San Nazzaro in the city of San Francesco d'Albaro, Villa de Nobili Fossati Raggio (1906, modified in 1919), the Palazzo at the corner of Via G. Carducci and Via G. Medici del Vascello in Albaro, the Palazzo on Via Alessandro Malaspina in Cornigliano, and several significant villas on Via San Nazaro in Albaro. In the city of Genoa, he was also the 'sindaco' (the one who chaired the board meetings and represented the company) of Saponificio Ligure, an important company based in Rivarolo on Via Cesare Battisti, and a member of the board of directors of Società Cementifera Italiana. He was also part of S.A. Ercole Marchetti in Milan. In 1910, he decided to become a life member of the Touring Club Italiano, paying the considerable amount of one hundred lire, a significant sum for that time. In 1929, he declared an income of six thousand lire, which the Ministry of Finance contested to be fifty thousand lire (the highest among all those working in the "technical professions" in the entire municipality of Genoa for that year).

=== Viareggio and Lucca ===
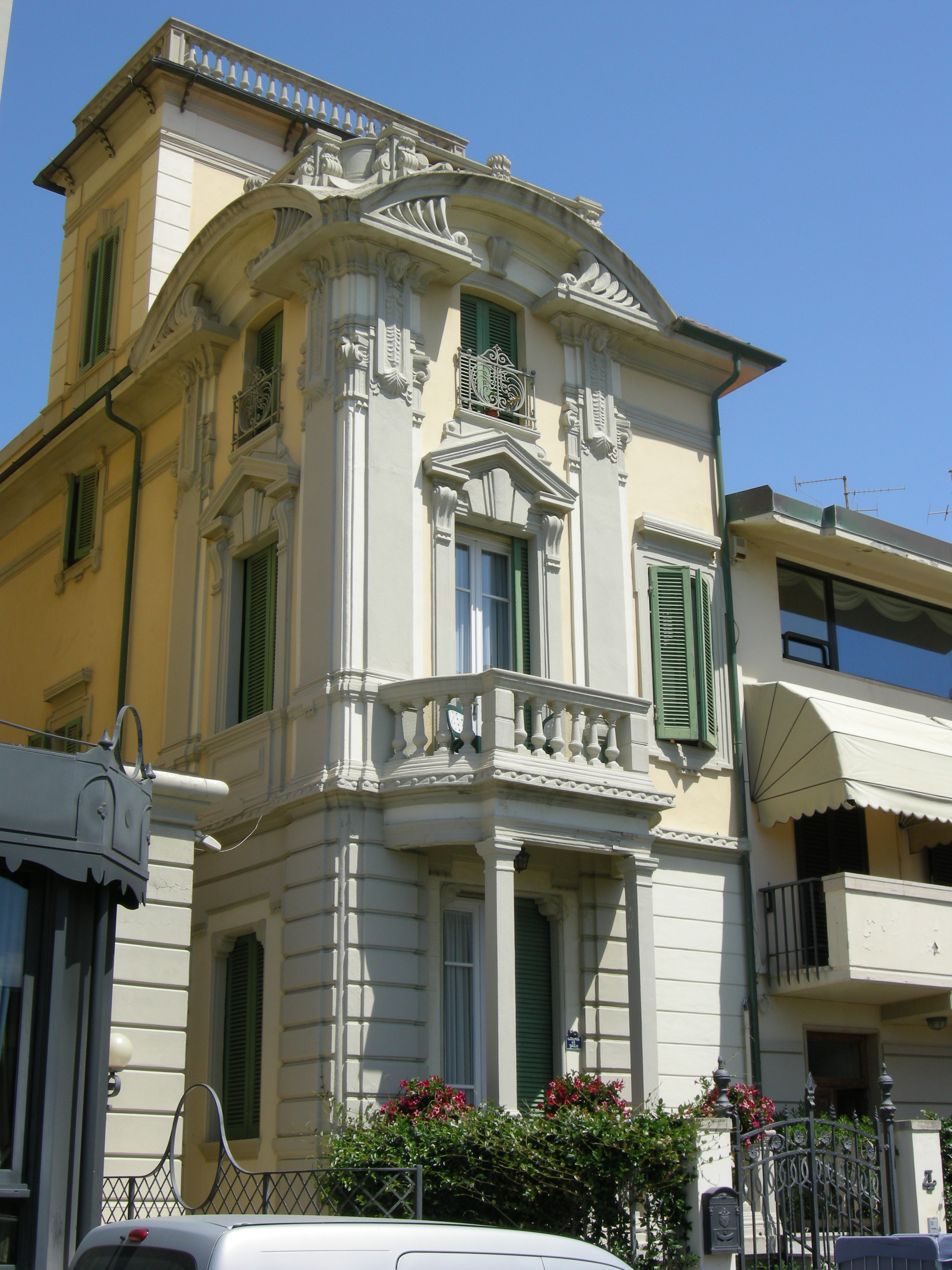
Villino "il guscio" in Viareggio

While maintaining his practice in Genoa, Orzali also worked in Viareggio and especially in his native city, Lucca, where he was called upon to participate in the urban renewal of the ancient city in the early 20th century. He worked on the expansion of the Teatro del Giglio, personally discussed with Giacomo Puccini and the mayor (1911), and the creation of the gallery between Piazza San Michele and Piazza Grande (1926). He also worked on the restoration of religious buildings, including the Church of San Romano, where he designed the high altar (1924), and the Church of San Francesco, for which he designed the completion of the facade (1927). In 1925, he also signed the redevelopment master plan for the city center. Between 1925 and 1927, he worked on the building of S.A. Idroelettrica Gallicanese, the facade of Banca Bertolli in Piazza San Michele, and the Sestini and Mantaiuti palaces. Notable among his works in Lucca are also various private buildings, mostly in the Art Nouveau style, such as Villa Ducloz (1903), Villa Fanucchi (1910), Villa D'Andia, Villa Malerbi (1929), Villa Puccinelli, Villa Simonini or Simonetti (1909), Villini Franchini (1907 and 1914), Ozali was also a member of the Provincial Commission for the Conservation of Monuments and Antiquities in Lucca, at least between 1922 and 1933, while maintaining his practice in Genoa.

In Viareggio, the area where his father Modesto also worked, some of his notable projects include the Chizzolini Villas (1910), Hotel Imperiale (1913), and Villino Il Guscio.

=== Later life and death ===
In his later years, he was also influenced by Rationalism, probably seen as a modern version of the classicism that had pervaded his work until then. Orzali lived and worked in Genoa for more than fifty years, where he died in 1954. According to his wishes, he was later transferred and buried in Lucca. He had a son, Alessandro, born in Lucca on 18 November 1901.

== Bibliography ==
- Maria Cristina Poggi; Vinicio Giovanni Mazzuola; Mariella Morotti (2022). Gaetano Orzali 1873-1954. Maria Pacini Fazi Editore. ISBN 9788865507872.
- Manfredi Nicoletti (1978). Liberty Architecture in Italy. Laterza. p. 299. ISBN 9788842014775.
- Carlo Cresti; Luigi Zangheri (1978). Architects and Engineers in 19th Century Tuscany. Uniedit. p. 171.
- Rossana Bossaglia (1987). Archives of Italian Liberty. Franco Angeli. pp. 304–306/312. ISBN 9788820424350.
- Modern Constructions in Italy. Genoa. Turin: C. Crudo & C. 1909.
