= Buffalo Bills (disambiguation) =

The Buffalo Bills are a professional American football team based in Buffalo, New York.

Buffalo Bills may also refer to:

- Buffalo Bills (AAFC), a former American football team, also based in Buffalo, New York, that played in the All-America Football Conference from 1946 to 1949
- Buffalo Bills (quartet), a barbershop quartet formed in Buffalo, New York

== See also ==
- Buffalo Bill (disambiguation)
- Buffalo Bill's, a hotel and casino in Primm, Nevada
- Buffalo Bulls, the athletic teams representing the University at Buffalo in intercollegiate athletics
