= Italian Society for the Advancement of Science =

- Società Italiana per il Progresso delle Scienze
- Abbreviation: SIPS
- Formation: 1839; 187 years ago
- Type: ONLUS
- Headquarters: Rome, Italy
- Website: www.sipsinfo.it

The Italian Society for the Advancement of Science (Italian: Società Italiana per il Progresso delle Scienze; SIPS), founded in Pisa in 1839, is one of the oldest scientific societies in Italy. As a non-profit organization, it promotes general interest in the sciences and facilitates exchange between scientists from different disciplines, primarily through interdisciplinary congresses, meetings, seminars, and publications. Before the establishment of many Italian specialized societies, SIPS served as an association of scientists from various fields, including physicists and chemists. After a period of inactivity towards the end of the 19th century, SIPS was reestablished in 1906 in Milan by Vito Volterra and Alfonso Sella. In 1937, Guglielmo Marconi enabled SIPS to establish itself at the Consiglio Nazionale delle Ricerche in Rome. At that time, the society was divided into three classes with different scientific focuses.

Its members included notable Italian scientists, such as physicist and Nobel laureate Enrico Fermi, chemists Francesco Filippuzzi and Giacomo Luigi Ciamician, and Nobel laureates in Medicine Camillo Golgi and Daniel Bovet.

Some important publications include: Un secolo di progresso scientifico italiano (1839–1939, 7 volumes), the Indice generale storico-cronologico alfabetico e analitico lavori, contributi e quadri direttivi (1839–2005), the Annuario della SIPS, and the journal Scienza e Tecnica.

== Origins ==
The society's activities among scientists from various states of the Italian Peninsula date back to 1839, in pre-unification Italy, with the First Meeting of Italian Scientists in Pisa. This initiative was led by a group of scientists from various disciplines, inspired by the European movement of the time that focused on progress and human well-being, known as positivism. Its promoters were Charles Lucien Bonaparte, a zoologist and nephew of Napoleon, Vincenzo Antinori, Giovanni Battista Amici, Gaetano Giorgini, Paolo Savi, and Maurizio Bufalini.

During the XI Meeting of Italian Scientists, held in Rome in 1873 and presided over by Terenzio Mamiani, sessions on October 25 and 27 approved the establishment of an "association or society of Italian scientists in imitation of the British and French associations for the advancement of sciences." Thus, the Italian Society for the Advancement of Science was formally established and began its activities in 1875 with the approval of the Regulations at the opening of the XII Meeting of Italian Scientists in Palermo. Terenzio Mamiani was elected as the society's president.

The initiative, however, did not continue, and no further congresses or publications were organized.

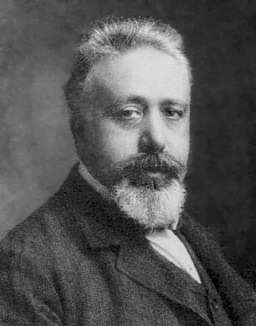
Vito Volterra, first president

== The New Society ==
The society was reconstituted starting in 1906 on the initiative of Vito Volterra, Arturo Issel, and Pietro Romualdo Pirotta, with preparatory work for the first congress held in Parma in September 1907. By royal decree on October 15, 1908, the Italian Society for the Advancement of Science was established as a national moral entity.

The society had among its presidents notable Italian scientists such as the mathematician Vito Volterra, the chemist Giacomo Ciamician, and the Nobel laureates in medicine Camillo Golgi and Daniel Bovet. The physicist Enrico Fermi served as vice president in the late 1920s.

The current statute, approved in 1974 by decree of the President of the Republic, states that the society "aims to promote the progress, coordination, and dissemination of sciences and their applications and to foster relationships and collaboration among their practitioners" (Article 1 of the statute).

== Bibliography ==
- Indice generale storico-cronologico alfabetico e analitico lavori, contributi e quadri direttivi (1839-2005) (PDF). Rome: SIPS. 2005.
- Myres, John L. (May 1923). "The Italian Society for the Advancement of Science". Nature. 111 (2794): 685–685. doi:10.1038/111685a0. ISSN 0028-0836.
