= Palazzo Balbi Piovera Raggio =

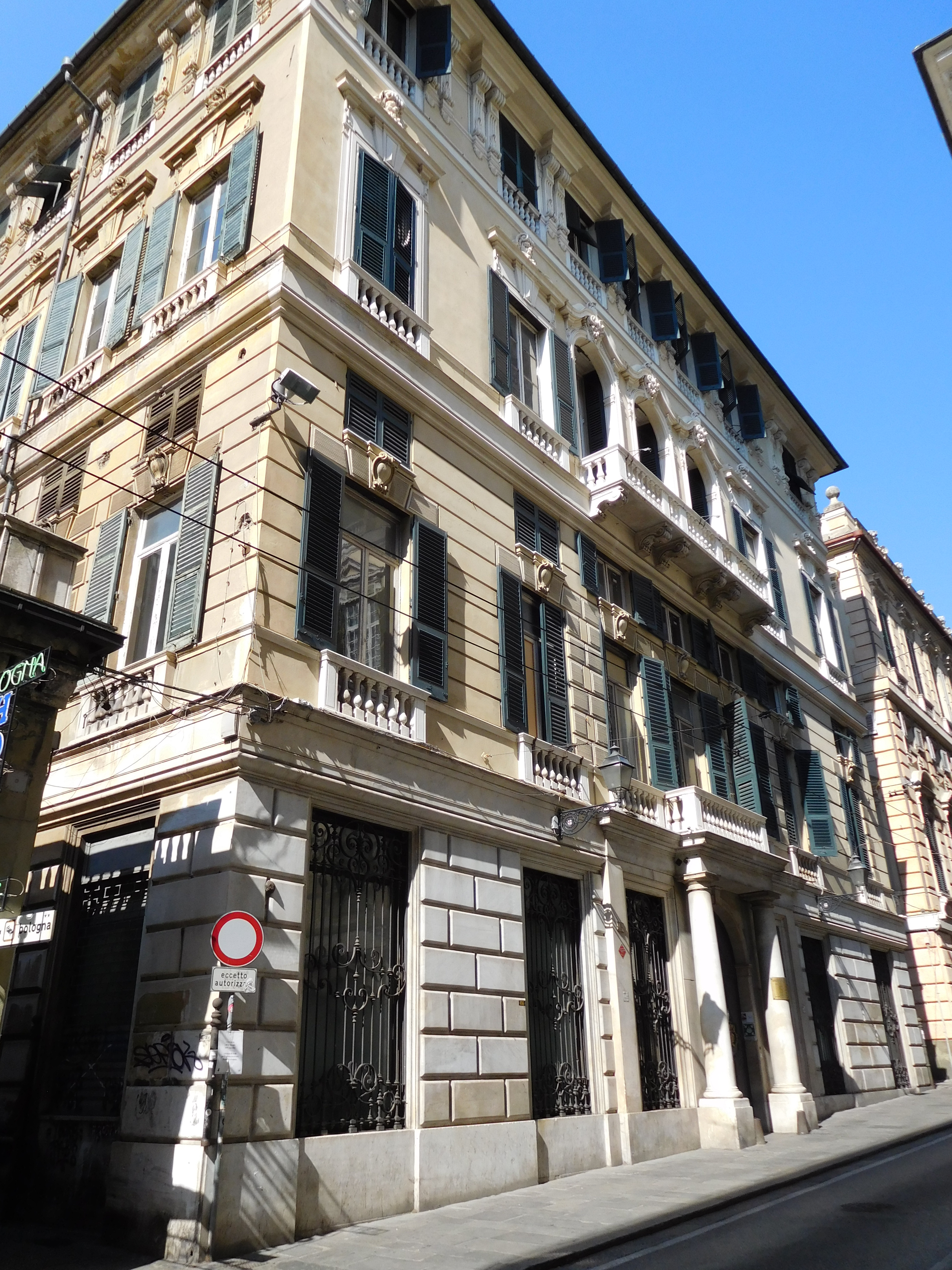
- Facade of the Palazzo Balbi Piovera Raggio in via Garibaldi 6
- Interactive map of the Palazzo Balbi Piovera Raggio area
- Alternative names: Palazzo Francesco Maria Balbi Piovera

General information
- Status: In Use
- Type: Palace
- Architectural style: Mannerist
- Location: Genoa, Italy, 6, Via Garibaldi
- Coordinates: 44.414625°N 8.927036°E
- Current tenants: University of Genoa
- Construction started: 1657
- Completed: 1665

Design and construction
- Architects: Pietro Antonio Corradi; Nicolò Laverneda; Giovanni Battista Grigo; Luigi Rovelli

UNESCO World Heritage Site
- Part of: Genoa: Le Strade Nuove and the system of the Palazzi dei Rolli
- Criteria: Cultural: (ii)(iv)
- Reference: 1211
- Inscription: 2006 (30th Session)

The Palazzo Francesco Maria Balbi Piovera is a monumental building located in via Balbi at number 6 in the historical centre of Genoa. The palace was included on 13 July 2006 in the list of the 42 palaces inscribed in the Rolli di Genova that became World Heritage by UNESCO on that date. The building, also known by the name of palazzo Raggio from the name of the armor who purchased it in the 19th century, is today the seat of the Faculty of Letters of the University of Genoa.

== History and description ==
The last of the palaces in via Balbi, it was erected between 1657 and 1665 on the initiative of Francesco Maria Balbi, a leading figure in the family (after Stefano), engaged in numerous financial and political activities including the appointment as feudal lord of the Alessandria village of Piovera, who commissioned the architect Pietro Antonio Corradi (1613—1683) for the project; the building is, however, better known as the residence of his nephew Costantino Balbi.

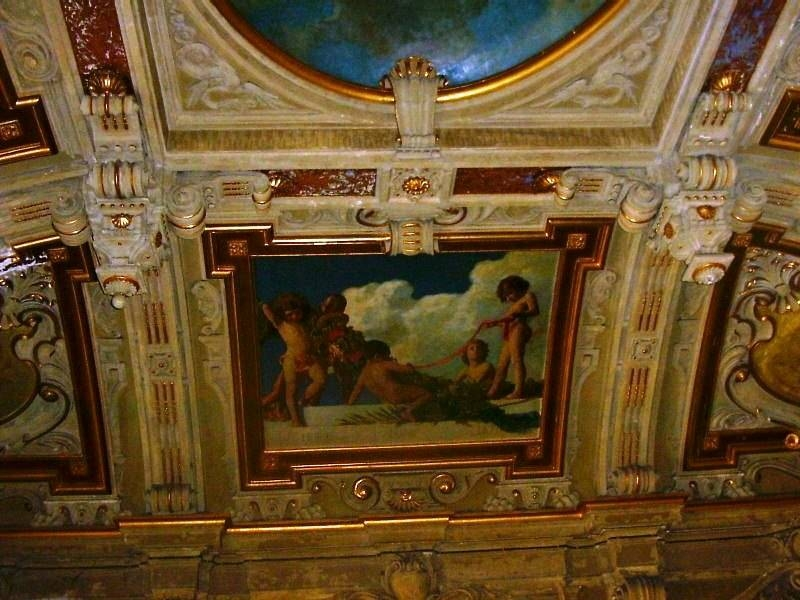
The decorations on the staircase.

It underwent profound alterations starting from the first decades of the 19th century when the new owner, Marcello Luigi Durazzo (secretary of the Accademia Ligustica di Belle Arti) commissioned the architect Nicolò Laverneda and the painters Michele Canzio, Francesco Baratta and Giuseppe Gaggini to restore and decorate the palace.

More radical transformations took place at the behest of Edilio Raggio, a shipowner and industrialist, who bought the building from the Gropallo family in 1870, suppressing all memory of the historical complex of the hospital and abbey of Sant’Antonio Abate that faced, at noon of the block, onto via Pré.

The architect Luigi Rovelli, commissioned by Edilio Raggio, not only demolished the church rebuilt by the architect Giovanni Battista Grigo in 1650 in 1881, but also proceeded with a massive demolition of the interior of the palace to build new reception rooms and erect an imposing staircase supported by rampant arches and cross vaults.

One of the reception rooms was decorated by the fresco painter Luigi Gainotti (1859—1940) with an exaltation of Genoa's merchant activity, while the decoration of the walls and the vault of the staircase was entrusted in 1883 to the painter Cesare Viazzi (1857—1943) who produced a cycle of seven works celebrating the Sabard dynasty using the tempera technique (L’Italia del Popolo, The Monarchy swears allegiance to the Statute, Slavery with tied hands looks at Buonarroti’s dome, Italy sits on the throne of Rome, The Wars for the Unity of Italy commemorated by putti with festoons (2), Putti support the Savoy coat of arms that is not visible in the Tricolour of Italy).

The work was liked, it was widely praised and the Genoese newspaper Il Caffaro (successor to the historical Annali del Caffaro) dedicated an entire page to it, illustrated, later granted in reproduction to the Novi Ligure periodical The Society. Raggio also entrusted Viazzi with the decorations of the Raggio castle in Cornigliano, which was later demolished in 1951 for the construction of the «Cristoforo Colombo» Airport in Genoa-Sestri Ponente.

== Sources ==
=== Italian sources ===
- P. Moncagatto, Palazzo Francesco Maria Balbi, in «Arkos», supplemento al n. 7/2004 «Il restauro dei palazzi dei Rolli», pp. 98-101.
