= Bufalino (surname) =

Bufalino is a surname. Notable people with the surname include:

- Bill Bufalino (1918–1990), American lawyer
- Brenda Bufalino (born 1937), American tap dancer and writer
- Gesualdo Bufalino (1920–1996), Italian writer
- Russell Bufalino (1903–1994), Sicilian-born American mafioso
