= DN-V Bufalo =

Mexican self-propelled howitzer

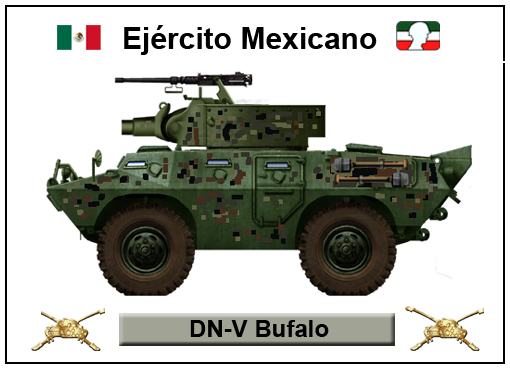
A DN-V Bufalo

The DN-V Búfalo (Buffalo) is a Mexican-made self-propelled 75 mm howitzer.

== History ==
The DN-V Bufalo was created in 1984 by SEDENA and DINA S.A. in Mexico, and only a few were made, they are used in the Mexican Army.

== Design ==
The Búfalo uses the turret of the howitzer motor carriage M8 with the body of Mexico's DN series armored personnel carriers and infantry fighting Vehicles. The DN-V Bufalo was made for Mobile Artillery support for Mexican Infantry.

=== Armament ===
- Primary: M8 75 mm howitzer
- Secondary: .50 caliber (12.7 mm) M2 machine gun

== See also ==
- Howitzer motor carriage M8
