= Buffalo Bill (disambiguation) =

Buffalo Bill, William F. Cody, (1846–1917) was an American soldier, buffalo hunter and showman.

Buffalo Bill may also refer to:

== People ==
- William L. Brooks (c. 1832–1874), Western lawman and outlaw
- William Wilson Quinn (1907–2000), U.S. Army lieutenant general
- Jay Wilsey (1896–1961), American actor often credited as Buffalo Bill Jr. in Westerns

== Film and TV ==
- Buffalo Bill (TV series), an American television situation comedy starring Dabney Coleman
- Buffalo Bill (1944 film), a film starring Joel McCrae and Maureen O'Hara
- Buffalo Bill, Hero of the Far West, a 1964 film starring Gordon Scott

== Books ==
- Buffalo Bill (The Silence of the Lambs), the primary villain in the 1988 novel The Silence of the Lambs and its 1991 film adaptation

== Places ==
- Buffalo Bill Dam and reservoir, near Cody, Wyoming, United States
- Buffalo Bill's, a hotel and casino in Primm, Nevada, United States
- Buffalo Bill's Brewery, a brewery in Hayward, California, United States

== Music ==
- "Buffalo Bill", song composed by Alan Hawkshaw with lyrics by Barry Mason, recorded by Washington Flyer in 1979 and Ursuline Kairson in 1980
- "Buffalo Bill", a song by Indeep, Michael Cleveland 1983
- "Buffalo Bill (Part 1)", song by Howard Hughes and The Western Approaches 1986
- "Buffalo Bill", a song by the jam band Phish
- "Buffalo Bill", a song by Eminem from the EP Relapse: Refill
- "Buffalo Bill", a song by Moxie Raia, 2013 single
- "Buffalo Bill", an unreleased song by Michael Jackson, 1983

== See also ==
- Buffalo Bills (disambiguation)
