= Francesco Antonio Bufalini =

Draftsman, engraver, and architect

Francesco Antonio Bufalini was a draftsman, copper plate engraver and architect from the circle of Carlo Fontana, working in Rome and Urbino. From 1688 to 1707 he is documented as a member of the Accademia dei Virtuosi al Pantheon and as an architect sottomaestro delle strade, whose duties encompassed those of surveyor, engineer, conservator and planning officer in Rome.

A recent discovery in the Ashmolean Museum, Oxford, of two rare and uncatalogued preparatory drawings for prints attributed to Bufalini, provide insight into the "calco" technique of transferring images onto plates to be etched or engraved. The drawings were treated with an oil and resin mixture, then placed face down onto a sheet of copy paper coated in chalk covering the plate. The design was then gone over with a stylus, transferring the image to be etched. Because of their use as working tools in an invasive print process, the survival of such drawings is a rarity. Bufalini's surviving preparatory drawings, c. 1683, are views of the exterior and a longitudinal section of St Peter's Basilica in Rome.
