= Maurizio Bufalini =

Italian physician

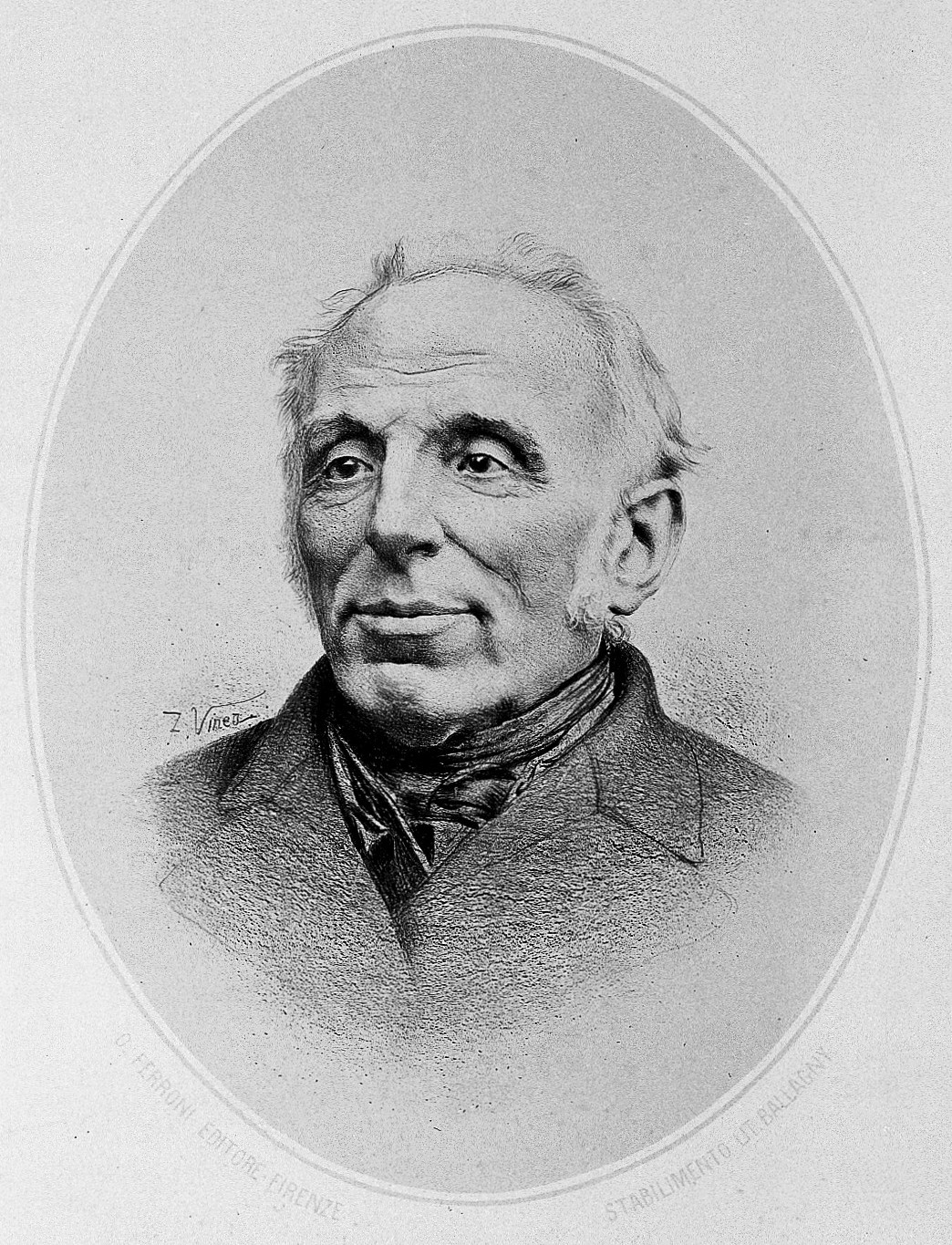
Maurizio Bufalini

Maurizio Bufalini (4 June 1787 – 31 March 1875) was an Italian physician. He served in the Senate of the Kingdom of Sardinia. He was a recipient of the Order of Saints Maurice and Lazarus.

== Bibliography ==
- Pasi, Romano (2002). Maurizio Bufalini e Luigi Carlo Farini: i due grandi protagonisti romagnoli del Risorgimento e della medicina dell'800 (in Italian). Edizioni del Girasole. ISBN 978-88-7567-393-2.
