= Cornigliano =

Western quarter of Genoa, Italy

Cornigliano Cornigén
- Quarter of Genoa
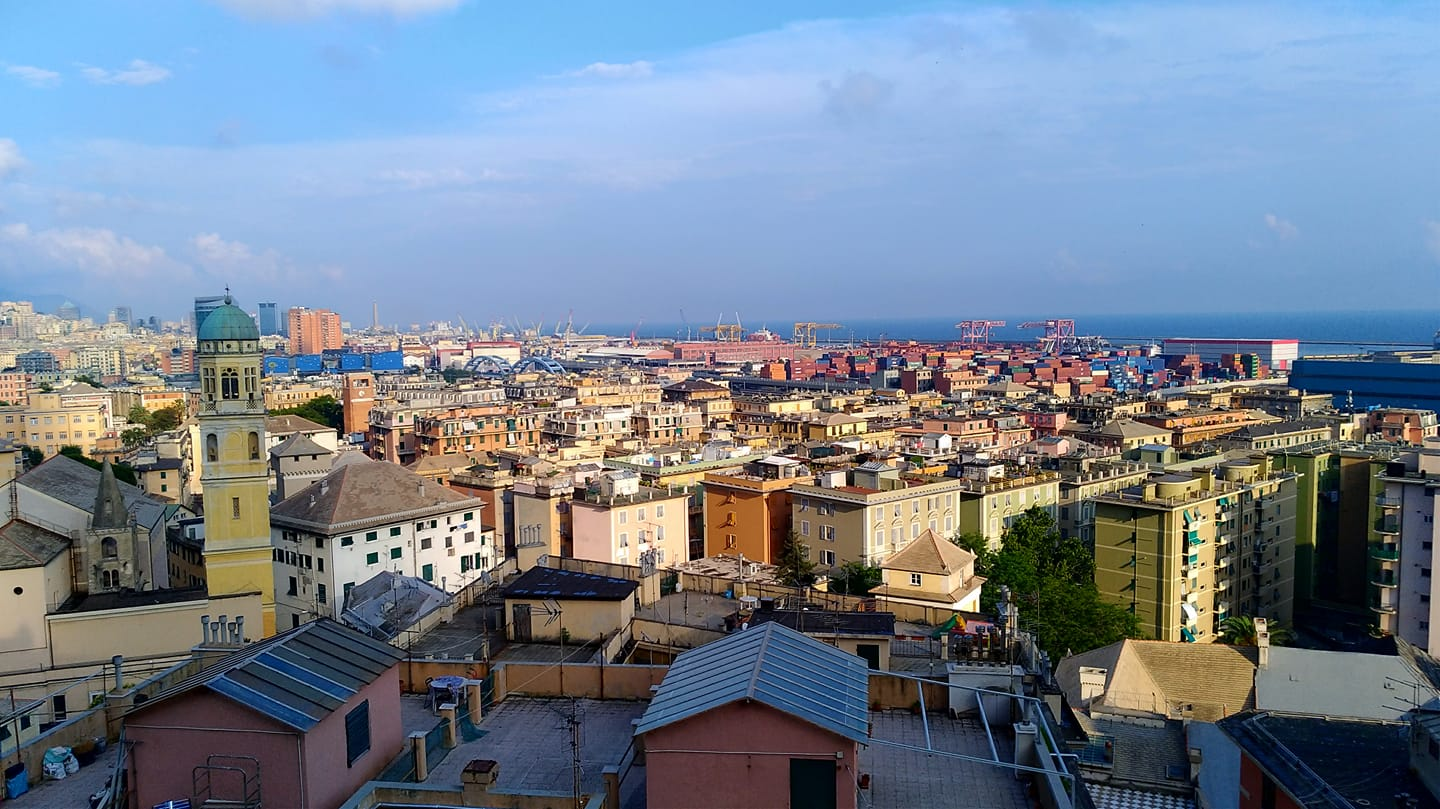
- View of Cornigliano from via Col di Lana.
- Interactive map of Cornigliano
- Coordinates: 44°24′57″N 8°52′14″E
- Country: Italy
- Region: Liguria
- Municipality: Genoa

Population
  - Total: 15,428
- Postal code: 16152
- Area code: 010

Cornigliano (Ligurian: Cornigén), also called Cornigliano Ligure from the name of the independent municipality until 1926, is a western quarter of the Italian city of Genoa.

From the fifteenth century onward, thanks to its location near both the sea and the city, it became one of the Genoese aristocracy’s preferred holiday destinations and still retains numerous noble residences that remain clearly recognizable within the modern urban fabric.

In the twentieth century, extensive industrial development, including the establishment of a large steelworks, had a severe impact on Cornigliano’s environment. Since the early 2000s, the district is undergoing continuous regeneration.

== Geography ==
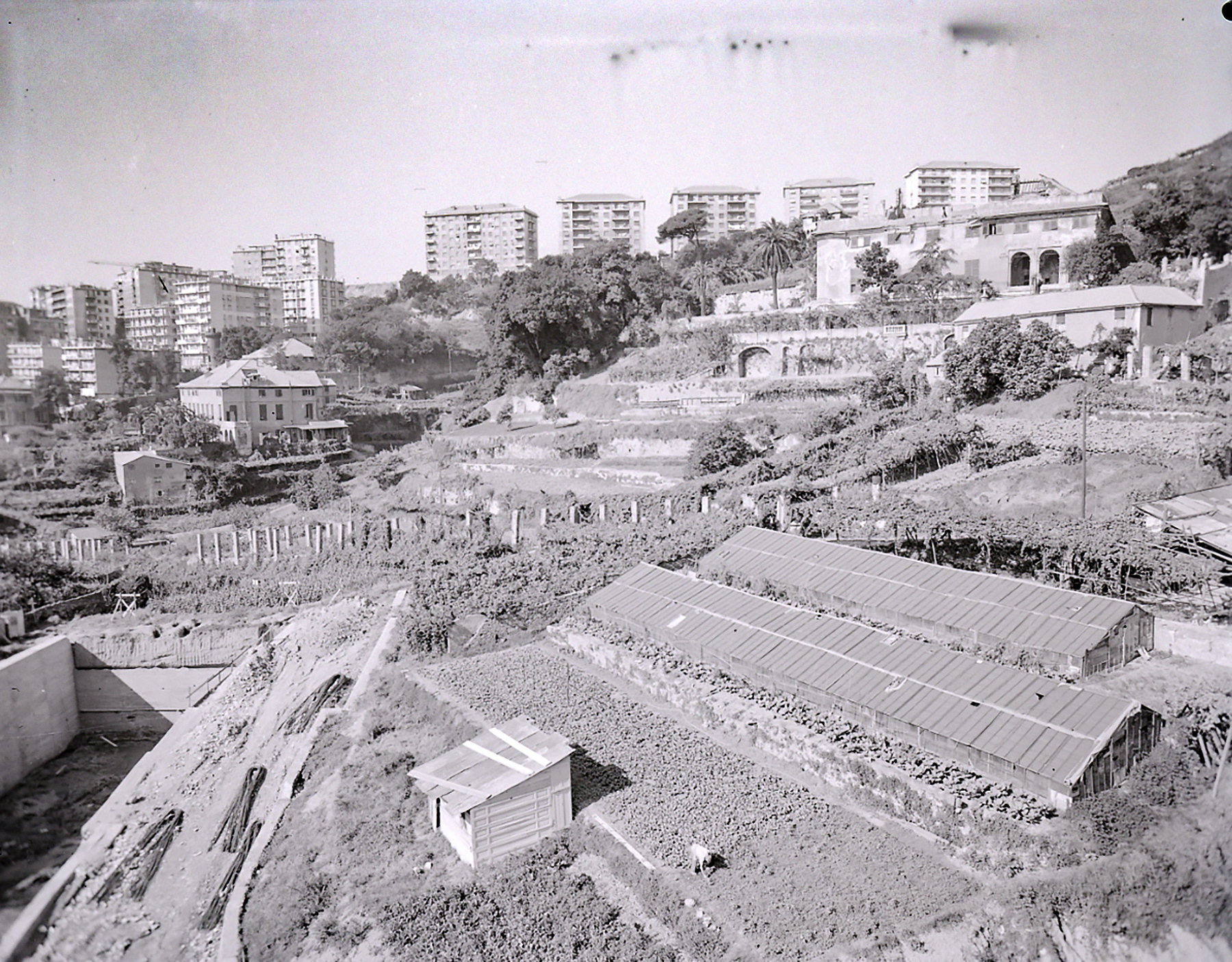
View of Cornigliano in a 1963 photo by Paolo Monti

Cornigliano lies on the coast about 7 kilometres west of the center of Genoa, between the quarters of Sampierdarena and Sestri Ponente. Cornigliano includes in its territory also the hamlets of Campi, Coronata and Erzelli. Along with Sestri Ponente is part of Medio Ponente sixth 'municipio' (administrative subdivision of Genoa).

Along the eastern boundary of the quarter one of the two main torrents flowing through Genoa, river Polcevera, flows and has its mouth into the Ligurian Sea.
