= Dario Carbone =

- Born: 1857; Livorno, Italy
- Died: March 27, 1934 (aged 76–77); Rome, Italy
- Occupations: Architect, Engineer, Urban planner

Dario Carbone (1857 – 1934) was an Italian architect, engineer and urban planner, particularly known for his activity in Genoa and Rome.

== Biography ==
=== Early life ===
Dario Angelo Carbone was born in Livorno in 1857 to Angelo Carbone and Anna Pomata. An architect, engineer, and later a professor, he moved to Genoa at the age of twenty-five, setting up his studio on the central via XX Settembre (initially at number 6, later at 18), where he received numerous and important commissions, particularly between the 19th and 20th centuries.

=== In Genoa ===
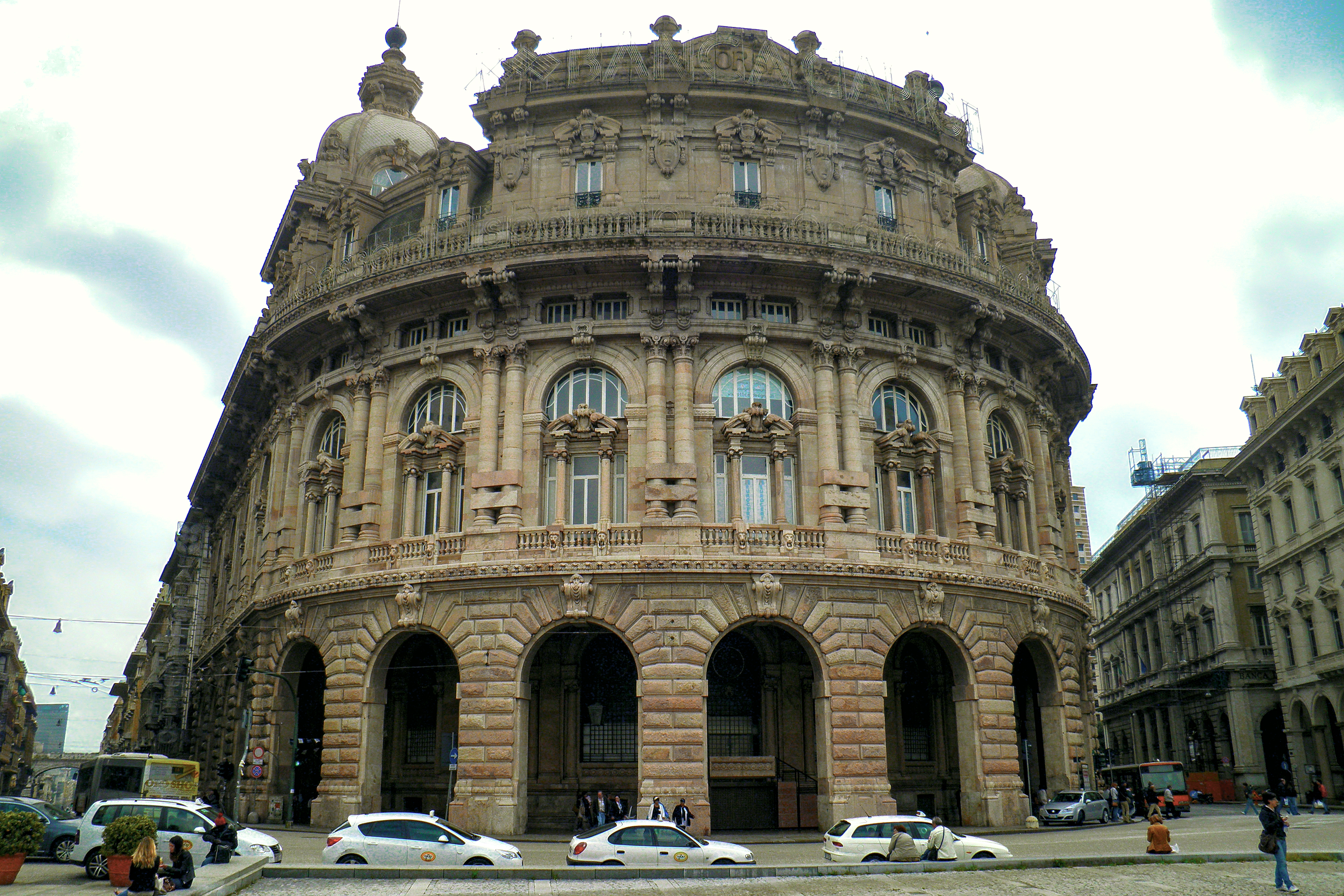
The Palazzo della Borsa in Genoa

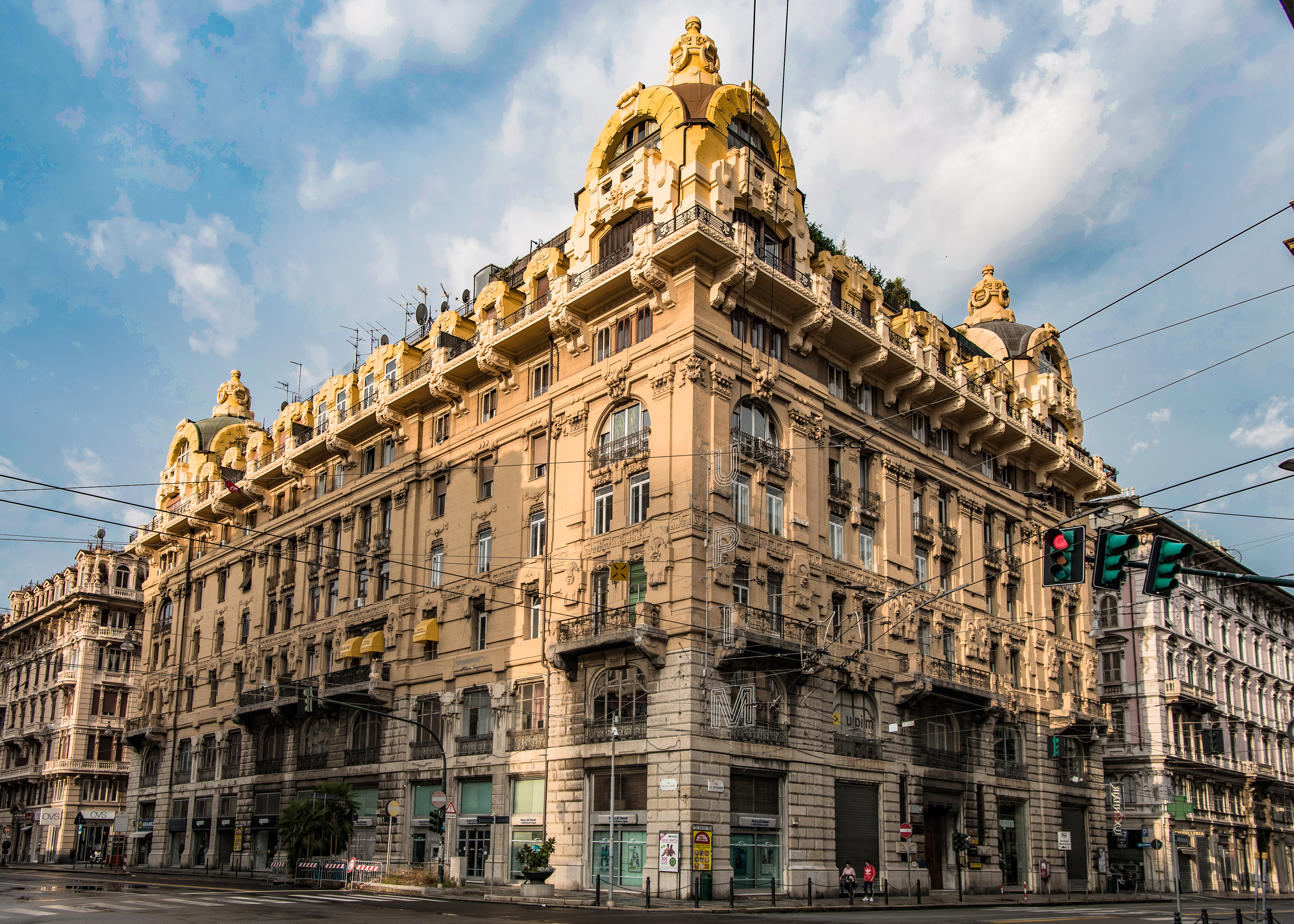
Palazzo delle Cupole

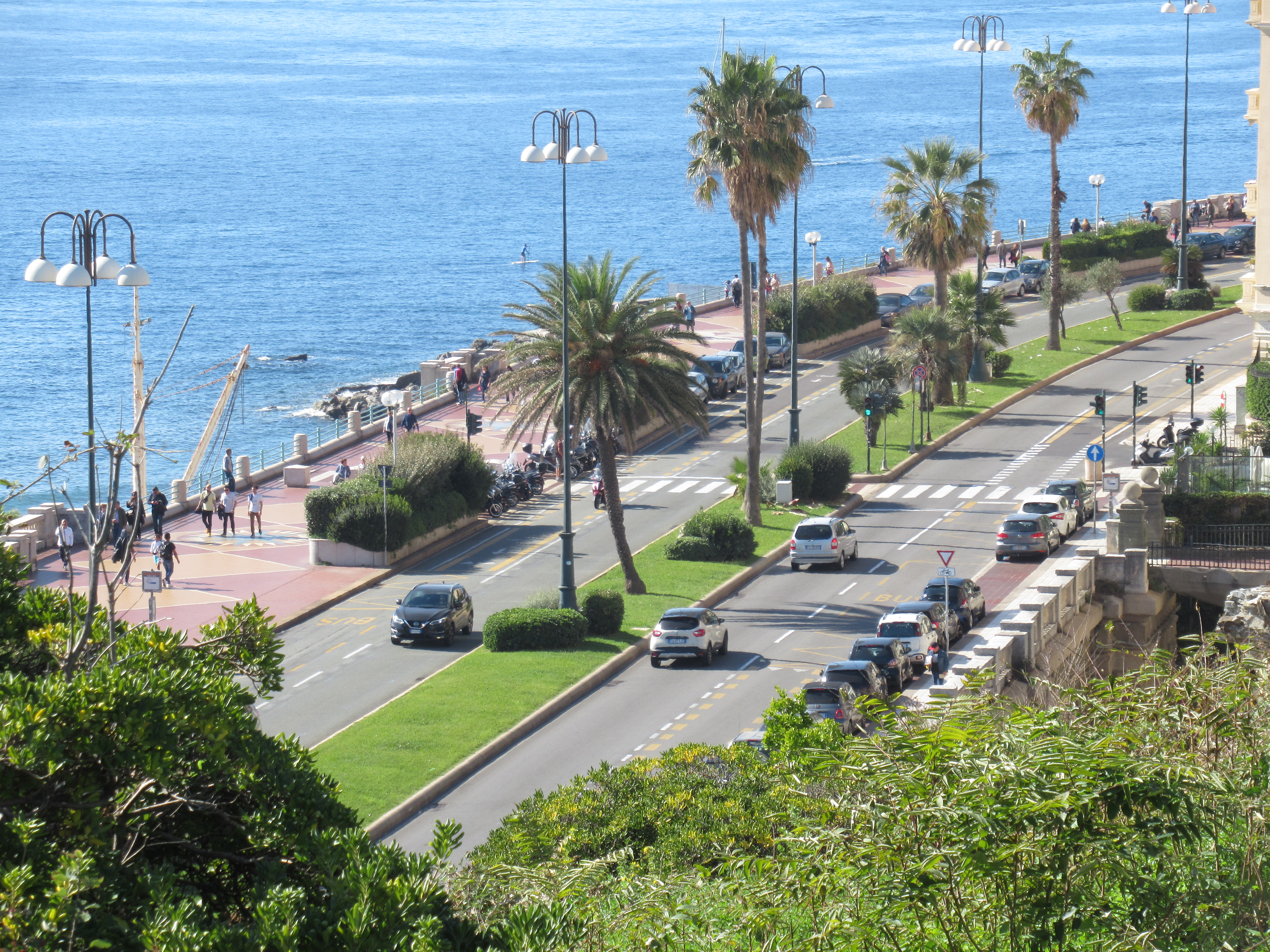
A section of Corso Italia, designed by Carbone

He arrived in the Ligurian capital at a significant moment for the city, as the urban landscape was changing and large, notable residential neighborhoods were emerging. He was particularly involved in the renewal of via XX Settembre, a thoroughfare that was being developed between 1892 and 1912 in the heart of the city center, according to the plan by Cesare Gamba.

Among the works he designed are the sumptuous Palazzo della Borsa in Piazza De Ferrari, and six buildings along via XX Settembre (including the Palazzo delle Cupole, the Palazzo dei Giganti, the Hotel Bristol Palace, and buildings at numbers 31, 33, and 37). The Palazzo delle Cupole, the first building on the street (number 2), designed with Podiani in 1905 and completed in 1909, is a significant example of Art Nouveau and, like most of Carbone's architectural works in the area, is subject to heritage protection. Also on the same street, Carbone designed the Hotel Bristol Palace building at number 35, as well as the subsequent building at number 37, which is also subject to specific architectural constraints and was renovated in 2023. Another building he designed (1896–1908) was the monumental Palazzo dei Giganti at number 14, in collaboration with Carlo Fuselli, characterized by columns and caryatids, and being the first building in Genoa to use reinforced concrete. He was also the designer of the imposing Palazzo delle Poste in Piazza Dante, also subject to heritage protection, and of Villa Weil, a luxurious villa in the upper circumvallation of Genoa, with works by the painter Cesare Viazzi.

He also designed Corso Italia, a long promenade along the coast, connecting the lower area of the city center to the ancient village of Boccadasse, inspired by the model of the Promenade des Anglais in Nice and built between 1909 and 1915.

The project for Genoa's Lido of Albaro is part of this suburban culture of the scenic seaside resort, a type of garden city. The plan, drawn up in 1906 by architect Dario Carbone, includes the area that stretches from the mouth of the Bisagno River in the eastern part of the city to the suburb of Sturla. The project for the promenade on the sea wall echoes the foundational characteristics of the construction of the French beach, while the subsequent plan proposed by Carbone at the initiative of the AEDES society in 1912 continues the previous one, albeit reducing many of the intentions of the first 1906 project. The plan for the Lido of Albaro is therefore defined as one of the last experiences of nineteenth-century tradition, where the elements of design memory can be referred to those European models that have determined a precise culture of building the seaside city.

—

In Genoa, he also held managerial positions in large companies, such as the construction company Aedes and the Ligurian Institute of Construction.

=== In Rome ===
In Rome, he was particularly involved in the work on Piazza Colonna. The project began after 1870 and the transfer of the capital to Rome. Carbone, along with Adolfo Coppedè, drafted an initial project, which was not accepted; on December 22, 1911, he presented a second one, to which, on February 14, 1912, he added a series of variants that were ultimately accepted. After the start of the works in 1914, the completion of the project was only achieved in 1940, long after Carbone's death, and under the direction of Alberto Calza Bini.

The contemporary press wrote about the Piazza Colonna project:

The architect Dario Carbone, to whose Ligurian tenacity we owe the solution, which is now about to be implemented and become, after a quarter of a century, a reality, of the problem of arranging Piazza Colonna

— Rassegna dei Lavori pubblici, 1913

For the city of Rome, Dario Carbone also conceived a project for the expansion of the city towards the sea, which was not realized but was published in 1912 and is now housed at the Library of the Institute of Archaeology and History of Art in Rome.

He died in Rome on March 27, 1934.

== Bibliography ==
- Dario Carbone; F. M. Martini (1914). Arch. Prof. Dario Carbone. Construction and projects. Bestetti & Tumminelli.
- Le costruzioni moderne in Italia: facciate di edifizi in stile moderno. Genova. Turin: C. Crudo & C. 1909.
- Dario Carbone entry (in Italian) in the Enciclopedia Treccani
