= Renzo Picasso =

Italian architect

Renzo Picasso (1880–1975) was an Italian architect, engineer, and urban planner and designer.

He was the author of the early twentieth century utopian projects for the city of Genoa, such as that for the Piazza de Ferrari, which suggested a development in height for those urban and metropolitan cities with a population of three million inhabitants or more.

His numerous projects for skyscrapers (or rather the "cloudscratchers" as he used to call the high rising towers he dreamt to build, "grattanuvole") are set in a context of wide open spaces to ease human socialization.

He was also the inventor of machines and devices characterized by the use of advanced technologies, such as the Motovol and the auto-scafopattino.

== Projects ==
- Piazza De Ferrari, Genova, 1909
- New city, New Genova, 1913, Renzo Picasso

== Bibliography ==
- Renzo Picasso (1936). I grattacieli ed i loro alleati in terra, in mare ed in cielo: The skyscrapers and their allies on land, water and in the air. Arti grafiche Caimo & c.
- Alessandro Ravera, "Ai due capi di una stessa rotta; New York e Genova viste da Renzo Picasso"
- Gian Luca Porcile, "Modelli urbani e tipologie edilizie: la città e il grattacielo nell'opera di Renzo Picasso"
- Nicola Canessa, "Dal treno verticale alla macchina volante: Renzo Picasso e l'utopia della mobilità"
- Luigi Berio, Viaggio in Liguria n°2: Renzo Picasso, FRCS Liguria, 2010
