= Bisagno (river) =

Italian river

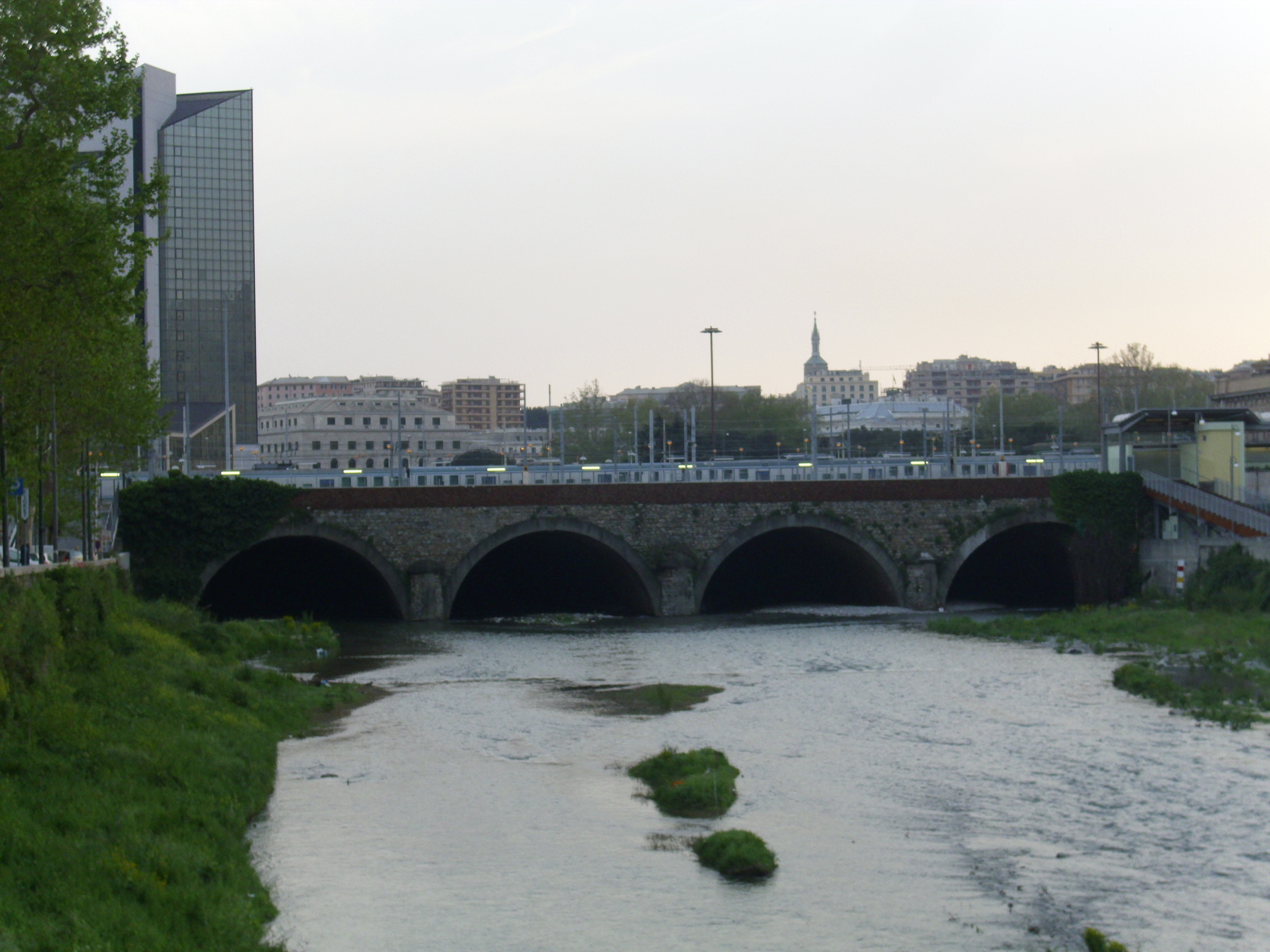
- The river at Genova Brignole railway station

Location
- Country: Italy

Physical characteristics
- Source
  - location: Passo della Scoffera
- Mouth: Ligurian Sea
  - location: Genoa
  - coordinates: 44°23′42″N 8°56′35″E
  - elevation: 0 m (0 ft)
- Length: 25 km (16 mi)
- Basin size: 95 km^{2} (37 sq mi)
- Discharge
  - average: 2.3 m^{3}/s (81 cu ft/s)

The Bisagno (Ligurian: Besagno [beˈzaɲu]) is a 25-kilometre (16 mi) river in Liguria (Italy).

== Geography ==
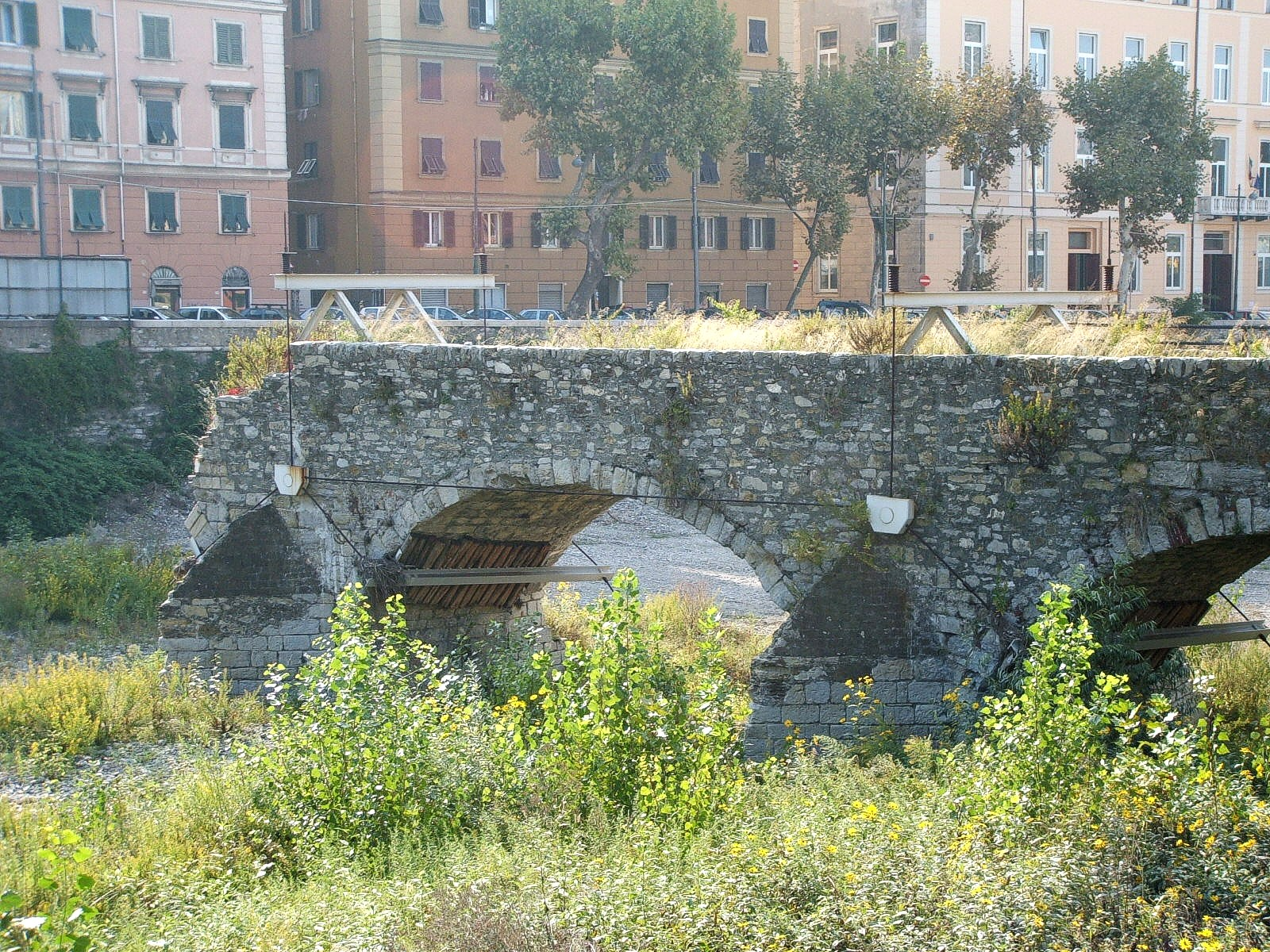
Sant'Agata old bridge

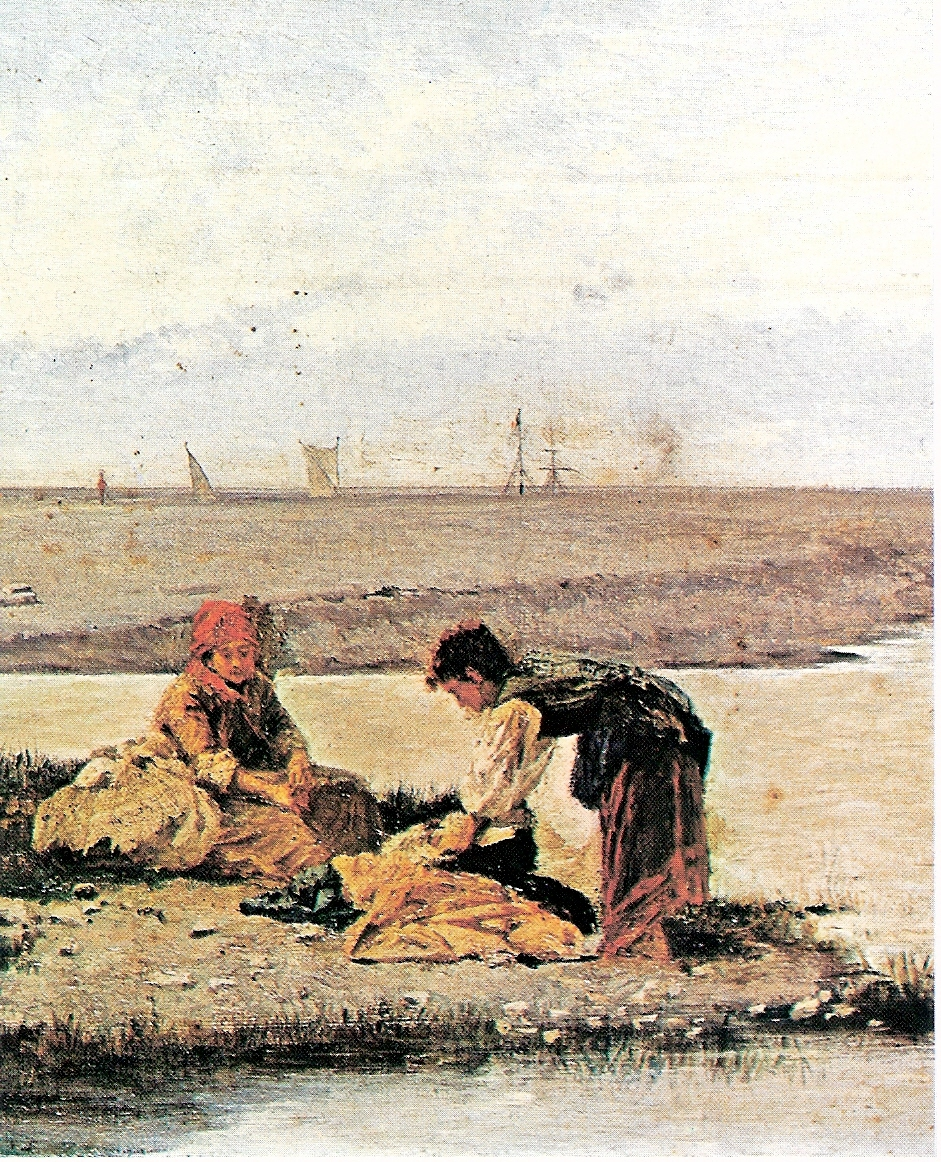
Antonio Varni: Bisagno mouth with laundresses at the end of the 19th century

The river rises near Scoffera pass at around 600 m in the Ligurian Apennines. It flows south-west in the Bisagno Valley and receives its two main tributaries, called torrente Lentro (from the left hand) and torrente Canate (from the right hand). Heading south it reaches Genova and ends its course in the Ligurian Sea. The last part of its course, from Genova Brignole railway station to the mouth, has been transformed in a water tunnel.

Bisagno basin (95 km2) is totally included in the Province of Genova.

=== Main tributaries ===
- Left hand:
  - torrente Lentro,
  - rio Montesignano,
  - rio Fereggiano.
- Right hand:
  - torrente Canate,
  - rio Torbido,
  - torrente Geirato
  - rio Trensasco,
  - rio Cicala,
  - rio Veilino.

== History ==
The Département du Bisagne o Dipartimento del Bisagno of Ligurian Republic took its name at the end of the 18th century from the stream.

== See also ==
- List of rivers of Italy
