= Via XX Settembre (Genoa) =

Street in Genoa, Italy

- Via Venti Settembre
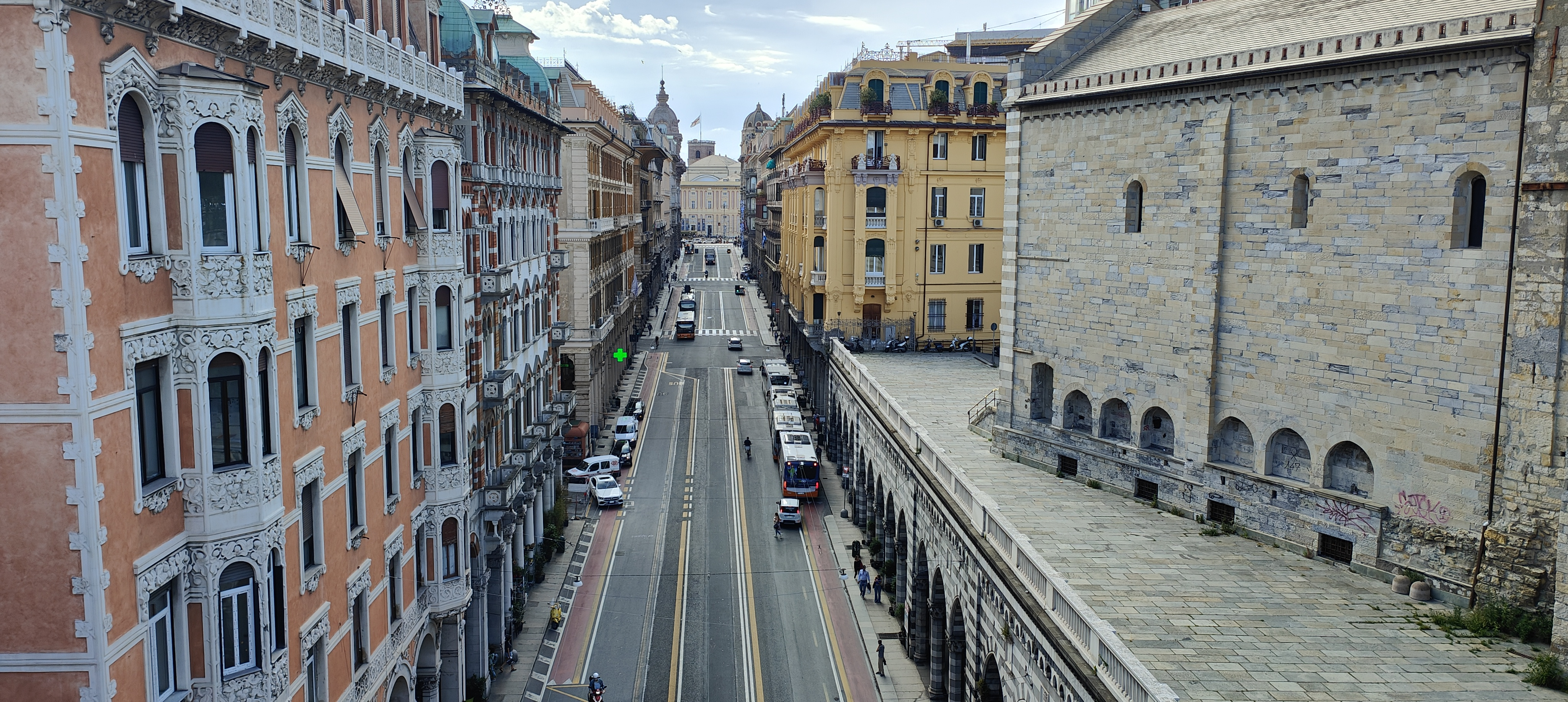
- Interactive map of Via XX Settembre
- Former names: via Giulia, via di Porta Pila, via della Consolazione
- Length: 0.850 km (0.528 mi)
- Location: San Vincenzo, Genoa, Italy
- Postal code: I-16121

Via XX Settembre is one of the main thoroughfares in the center of Genoa, Italy, located within the San Vincenzo district. It is slightly less than a kilometer long.

== Location ==
It runs east–west and, along with Corso Italia – the promenade along the seafront – is one of the main streets for strolling and shopping in the city, located in the city center. It traverses the two central districts of Portoria (the first stretch, with arcades, from Piazza De Ferrari to the Monumental Bridge) and San Vincenzo (from the Monumental Bridge to the junction with Via Cadorna near Piazza della Vittoria).

It intersects with numerous streets along its length, some of which were pedestrianized during the renovation work for the G8 Summit in 2001, and is rich with elegant shops. It serves as a link between the eastern part of the city, which faces east of the Bisagno river, and the western part developed beyond Largo della Zecca, towards Principe. In particular, it connects Piazza della Vittoria to Piazza De Ferrari, two of the city's major squares.

Almost exclusively lined with shops and city offices, Via XX Settembre slopes slightly upwards towards the west (although vehicle traffic flows in the opposite direction) and is adorned with some of the city's most imposing buildings; in the upper part of the street, a series of long arcades stretch along both sides, reaching the entrances of the Teatro Carlo Felice on the right side.

Along Via XX Settembre are some of the most prestigious shops and elegant cafés. Until the 1980s, the street was also rich in cinemas and theaters (such as Cinema Olimpia and Teatro Margherita), making it nationally known as "the street of cinemas".

== History ==
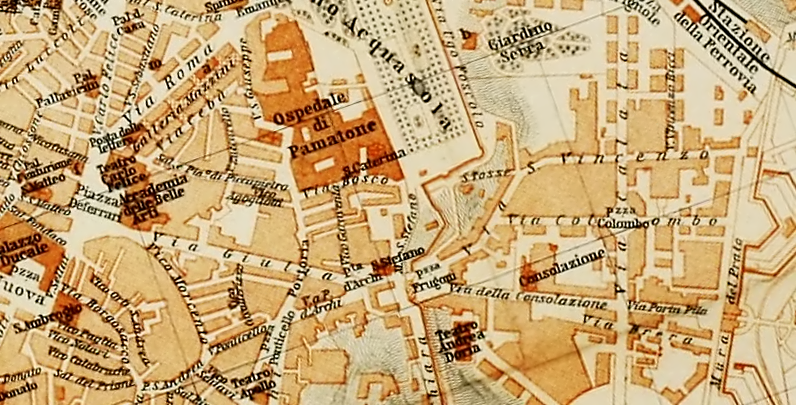
The central area corresponding to Via Giulia, Via della Consolazione, and Via Porta Pia, map published in 1886

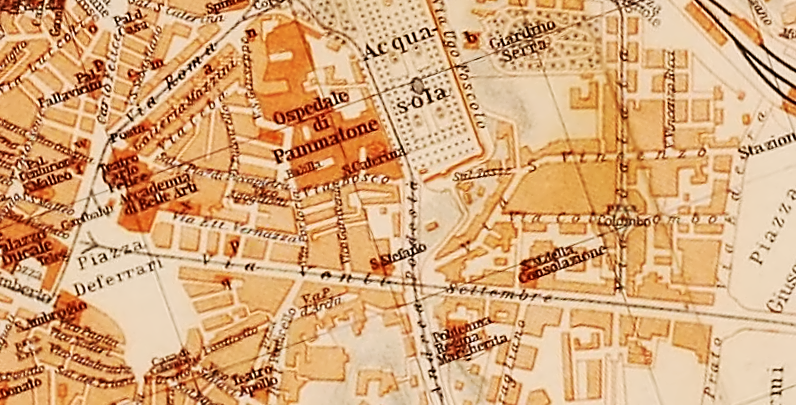
The central area corresponding to Via Giulia, Via della Consolazione, and Via Porta Pia, map published in 1906, after the construction of Via XX Settembre.

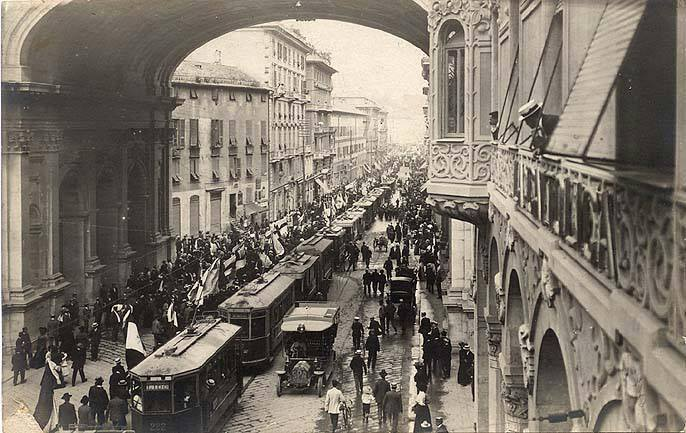
Via XX Settembre in 1907, during a parade

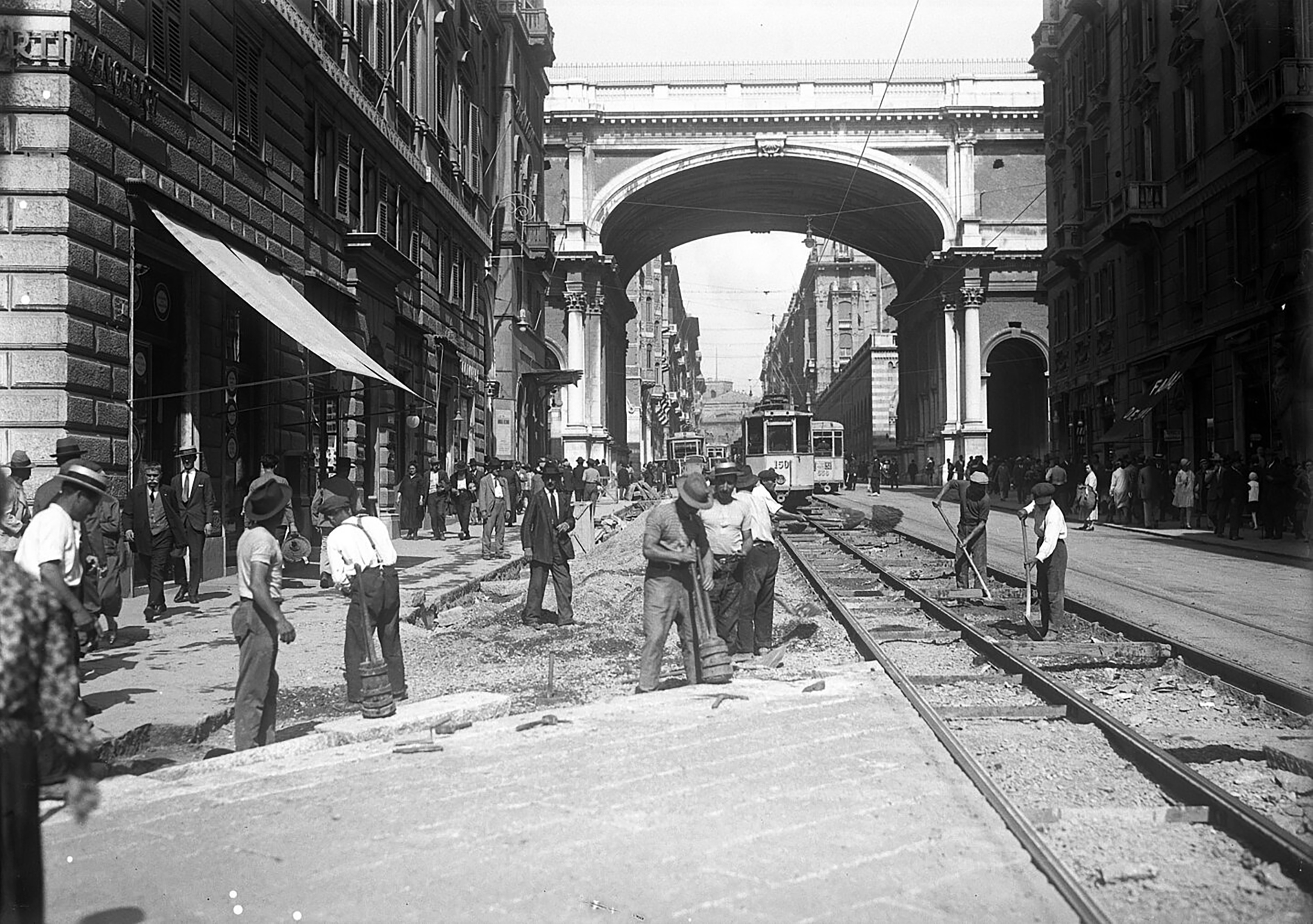
The operations of removing the original stone paving of the street, in 1929

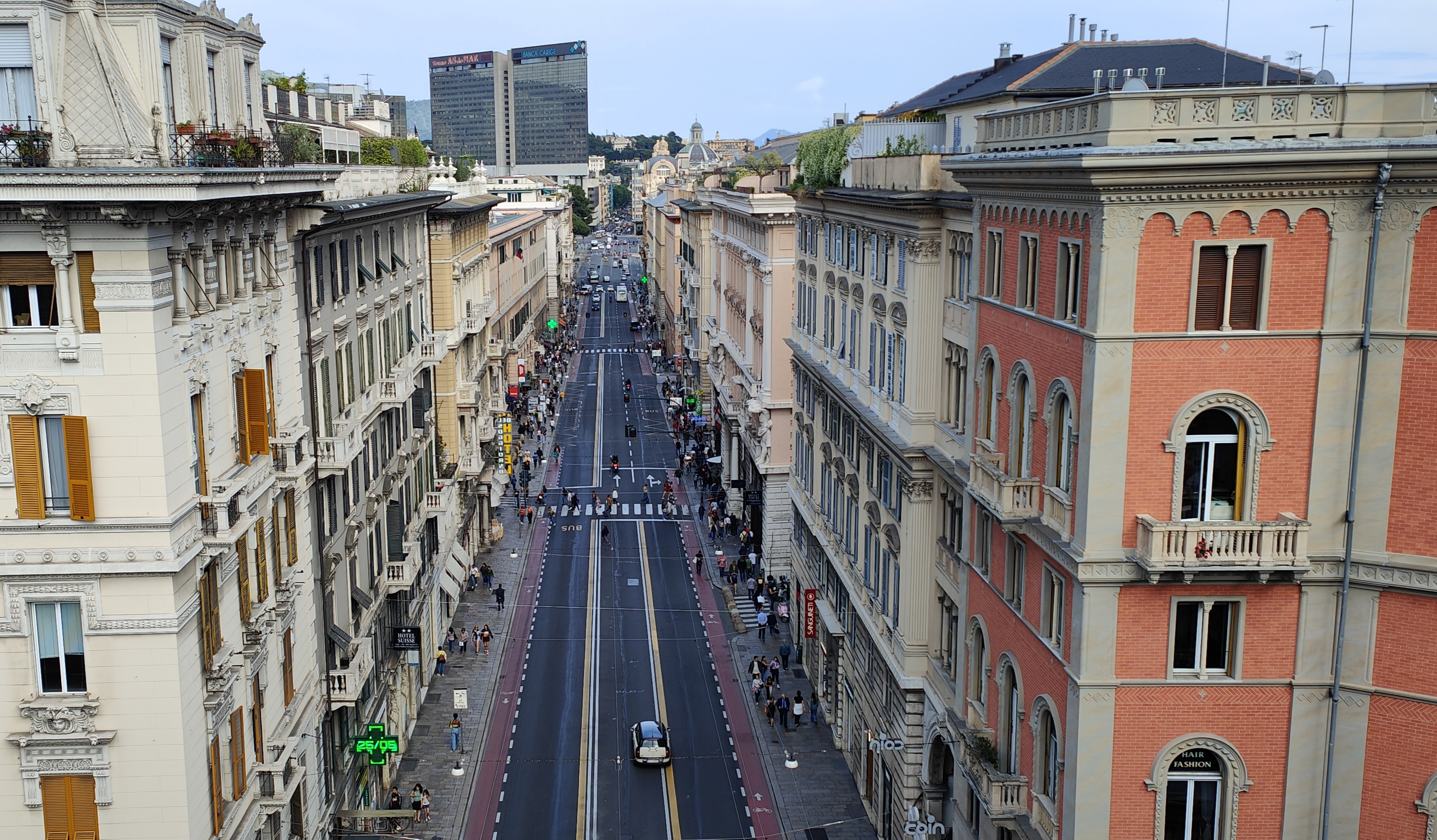
In the background: Piazza della Vittoria and Corte Lambruschini

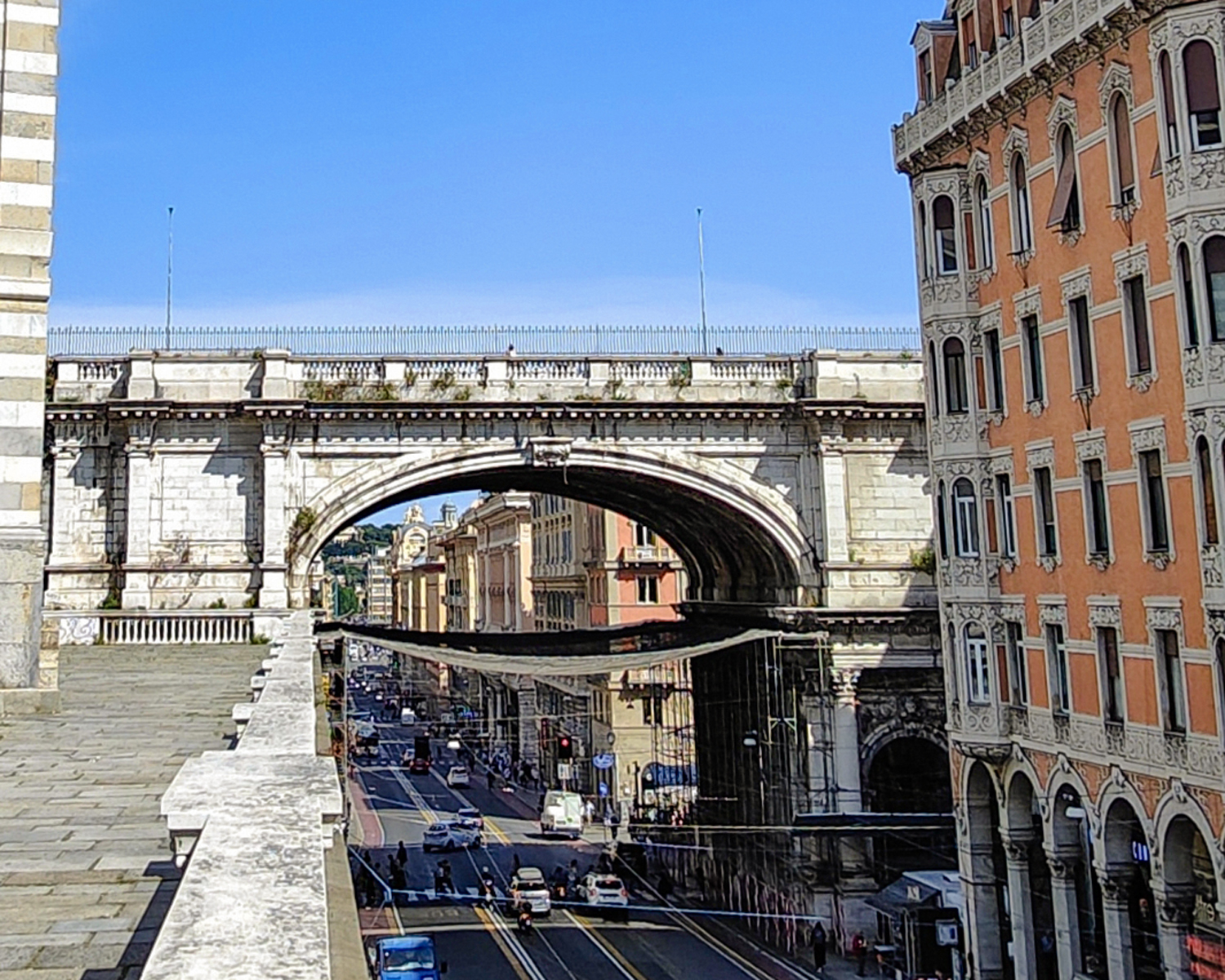
The Monumental Bridge seen from the square of the Church of Santo Stefano. Note the net underneath for renovation works

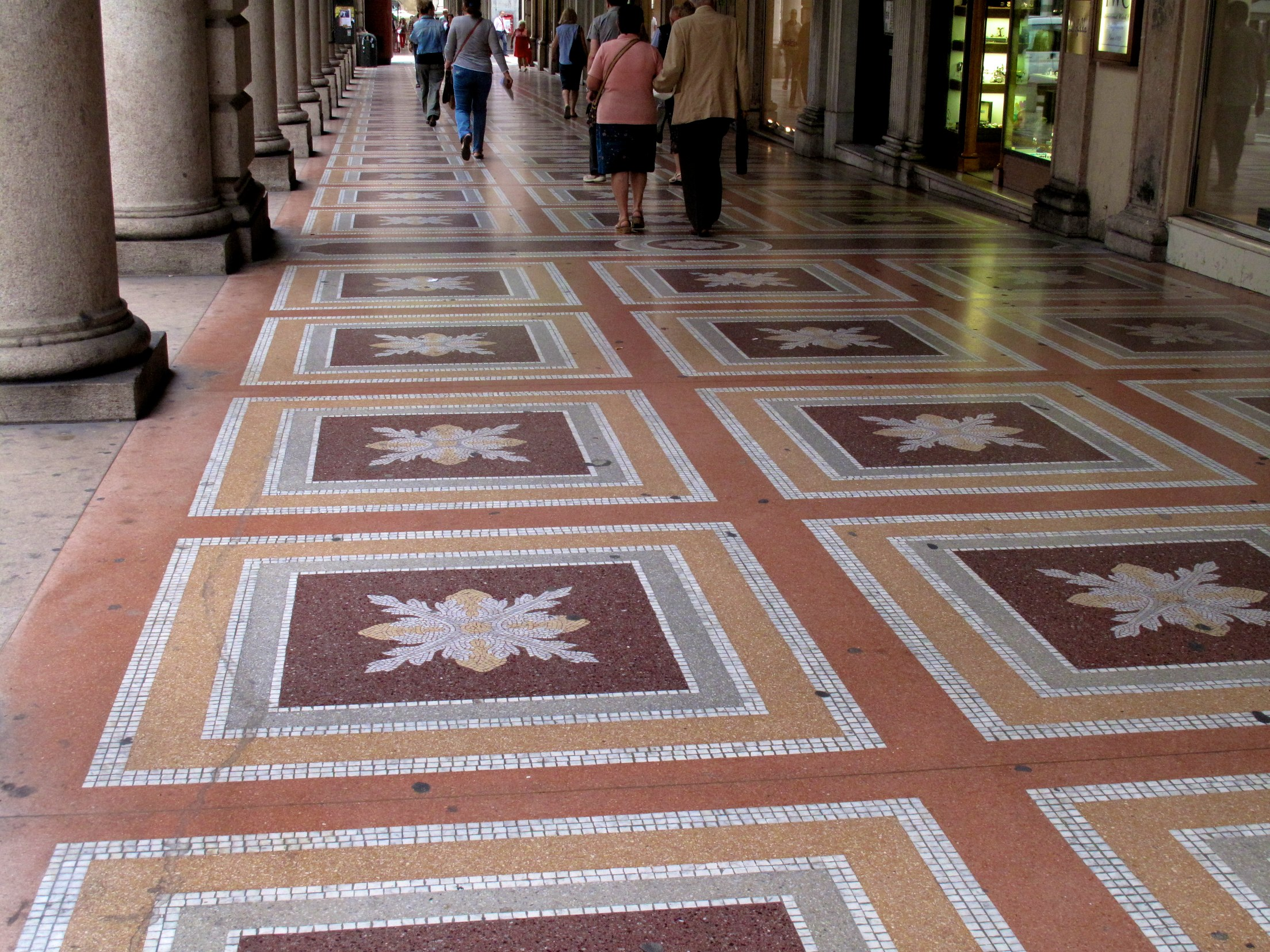
One of the mosaics under the arcades

The street was built in the last decade of the 19th century, rectifying and expanding the path of Via Giulia and Via della Consolazione, to create a new route towards the east, which until then had inadequate outlets for the city's urban expansion. The name of the new street was the subject of heated discussions at the time, until the desire of many citizens to have the historic date of the Capture of Rome recognized prevailed.

The street was strongly advocated by Mayor Andrea Podestà, but opposed by the resident population because building it required demolishing houses and shops. Especially opposed were the religious of the Church of the Remedy, expropriated to make way for the artery. Among the other necessary demolitions was the one, hindered by the government, of the Sant'Andrea prisons.

The stretch of road affecting the district of San Vincenzo (from the Monumental Bridge to Via Fiume), while not having the sumptuous appearance of the part between Piazza De Ferrari and the Monumental Bridge, characterized by high arcades with Venetian flooring, is equally filled with elegant palaces and shops, making the street one of the city's most frequented destinations for shopping and strolling. At the time of its opening, the street, wide, straight, and lined with buildings of unusual height for the times, more similar to the sumptuous Via Giuseppe Garibaldi of the Renaissance period, represented a novelty for the area, which until then had narrower streets and characteristic alleyways. The competition for the construction of the new street was announced in 1883, after nearly twenty years of debate, and only in 1887 was the project by Cesare Gamba approved. Work began in 1892. The lower part was first completed, with the reorganization of the former Via della Consolazione, finished the following year; the street was inaugurated on 18 January 1896. The construction of the various buildings facing the street would be completed only in 1913. All pre-existing buildings, except for the Church of the Consolation and the attached convent, were demolished and replaced by new buildings, constructed for the first time in Genoa in reinforced concrete.

The street was built on the route of the previous via Giulia, for the stretch from Piazza De Ferrari (then Piazza San Domenico, named after the homonymous church no longer existing) to the Monumental Bridge, and Via della Consolazione, for the stretch beyond the Monumental Bridge to Porta Pila. A project to expand via Giulia (a road dating back to the 17th century and modified several times to improve its accessibility for carts and carriages) had already been approved in 1840, but the practice was then blocked due to appeals by the owners of the buildings that would have been demolished or modified, and therefore in the following decades only minor works were carried out to reduce the slope by lowering the road level.

Via XX Settembre was redesigned on the axis of the two streets when, at the end of the 19th century, starting from 1892, the urban reorganization of the entire city center was decided. The design of the street was entrusted to the engineer Cesare Gamba. Along its route, and likewise in adjacent streets, the most emphatic Liberty-style buildings in the city were erected between 1892 and 1912. The street was built in two stages (a first lower stretch from Porta Pila to Porta d'Archi and an upper one from Porta d'Archi to Piazza De Ferrari), not without economic difficulties (the banking crisis of 1894 affected some of the entities that had financed the works) and the projects related to individual buildings, as well as the characteristics of the future street (such as the presence or absence of arcades), were modified several times over the years to adapt to the changing demands and needs of the municipality and the companies constructing them.

Crossing it longitudinally, approximately halfway along its route, is the Monumental Bridge, an imposing marble structure with multiple arches. The Monumental Bridge stands in the same place where the Porta dell'Arco, of the 16th-century walls, the so-called New Walls, once stood. Its role, like that of the Porta dell'Arco, is to link two systems of viaducts, one lower (Via XX Settembre) and one upper (Corso Podestà). It was built with a double design. The engineering part was again entrusted to the engineer Cesare Gamba, who realized (1895) an immense arch with a structure similar to those of railway bridges; it was overlaid with a monumental marble apparatus, with columns and sculptures.

Just before the Monumental Bridge is the Church dedicated to Santa Rita, called the Nostra Signora della Consolazione e San Vincenzo martire, whose entrance, corresponding to the level of the old streets, remains slightly lower than the current roadbed. Immediately beyond, raised above the street, is the Church of Santo Stefano, of Romanesque architecture and rebuilt on the remains of an ancient abbey Benedictine.

The street and its buildings, like much of the city, suffered heavy damage during the bombings on Genoa during World War II. Many civil and public structures were almost completely destroyed and then rebuilt, including: the aforementioned Church of Santo Stefano, the Teatro Margherita, and various others. Others were more or less seriously damaged, such as the Palazzo Orzali, the Palazzo Pesce Manieri, and some of the palaces of Dario Carbone and others.

During the city's redevelopment for the G8 summit in 2001, the sidewalks on half of the street facing Piazza De Ferrari were widened by several meters to allow for increased pedestrian traffic.

== Palaces ==
The long artery opened in the late nineteenth century is divided in two by the Monumental Bridge: the buildings in the upper part are equipped with arcades and architecturally more elegant, while in the eastern part prevail structures in reinforced concrete, innovative for the time, enriched by typical decorations of the Art Nouveau, which characterizes much of the new central areas of the city, or by traditional elements, inspired by Mannerist architecture or Florentine Gothic. There are numerous buildings of architectural interest, many of which are subject to architectural constraints.

The University of Genoa highlights among those worthy of artistic and architectural interest the civic buildings 1, 2, 3, 5, 8c, 10 – 12, 16 – 18, 19, 21, 23, 26, 28, 29, 30 – 32, 34, 36, 42. In the design, some of the most well-known Italian engineers and architects of the time were involved, such as Gino Coppedè, Luigi Rovelli, Benvenuto Pesce Maineri, Cesare Gamba, Dario Carbone, Gaetano Orzali, Stefano Cuneo, Raffaele Croce, Giuseppe Tallero, G. B. Carpineti, the Celle brothers, and others. Among the most significant buildings are:

=== Palaces on the South Side ===
- Civic 2, Palace of the Domes (Dario Carbone, 1909). Located at the intersection with Via Brigata Liguria, on the south side, it was built between 1905 and 1909 according to the design of Dario Carbone. Constructed entirely in reinforced concrete, even in the vertical structures, its facade is decorated with typical Art Nouveau motifs. It is characterized by four corner towers topped with domes.
- Civic 4, White Palace (Cesare Gamba, 1892). Inspired by a Renaissance style with Baroque influences and embellishments, it can be originally dated between the 16th and 17th century.
- Civic 6, Boggio-Rosazza Palace (Cesare Gamba, 1892). Inspired by a Florentine Gothic style, particularly that of the Medici-Riccardi Palace, it has a basement finished in rusticated masonry.
- Civic 8 (Giuseppe Rosso, 1933). The only building constructed significantly later than the arterial road, it presents a clear rationalist architecture with less marked classical influences. Its designer was also the author of the Civic Theatre of Vercelli and other significant works of the time.
- Civic 10–12, Zuccarino Palace (Stefano Cuneo, 1901). Designed at the beginning of the 20th century, it was built on the area where the Church of S. Maria della Pace stood. It has the shape of an inverted "E", with two internal courtyards open at the rear. In this case as well, the style appears as a contamination between Romanesque-Gothic and 16th-century Mannerism.
- Civic 2 of Via Maragliano, Zuccarino Palace (Gino Coppedè, 1907). Adjacent to the previous one, excessively rich in the most classic decorative elements typical of the famous Florentine architect, it is considered one of the finest Liberty-style buildings in the area.
- Civic 14, Giants' Palace (Dario Carbone, Eugenio Fuselli, 1895). In Art Nouveau style, it is located opposite the Church of Nostra Signora della Consolazione e San Vincenzo martire. The facade, tripartite at the base by four rusticated pillars, is adorned with four pairs of concrete atlases supporting four sets of paired columns. The palace housed the Genoese headquarters of Bureau Veritas, one of the oldest naval classification agencies, present in the Ligurian capital since 1848.
- Civic 16–18 (Adolfo Bisso, 1898). Adjacent to the Monumental Bridge, the palace was designed with an irregular shape to follow the course of the square in front of the bridge. It was severely damaged by the bombings on Genoa during World War II, but later restored. Through the palace, one accessed the Margherita Theatre, occupied since the 1990s by commercial activities. The entrance to the former theatre divides the building into two distinct wings, which also differ in the decorations of the facade: the eastern side has decorations inspired by 16th-century Mannerism, while the western side is in neo-romanticism style, with hanging arches.
- Civic 26 (Benvenuto Pesce, 1909). Also in Art Nouveau style, with orientalizing decorations, it has five floors plus a mezzanine, with a richly decorated facade featuring two polygonal turrets extending for four floors.
- Civic 28 (Raffaele Croce, 1909). The building has five floors. The brightly colored facade is decorated with pierced balconies and bifora and trifora windows. The palace is topped by two pagoda domes with copper coverings.
- Civic 30–32 (G. B. Carpineti, 1902). The building has a three-part facade both in width and height, decorated with pilasters and rustication on the corners.
- Civic 34 (Luigi Rovelli, 1902). The palace, with a neomanierist facade, has an irregular plan due to its location. The large projecting cornice, in which the windows of the fifth floor open, is characteristic.
- Civic 36 (Benvenuto Pesce, 1909). The facade has narrow elongated windows, well-spaced and surrounded by elegant decorations. The top floor consists of a loggia with paired columns.
- Civic 42 (G. B. Carpineti, 1905). The five floors are well highlighted by horizontal pilasters and vertical balconies, with alternating windows and bay windows on the lower floors. Originally built as a hotel structure, the ground floor features a large open space supported by columns with a semi-circular exedra from which an elliptical staircase begins.
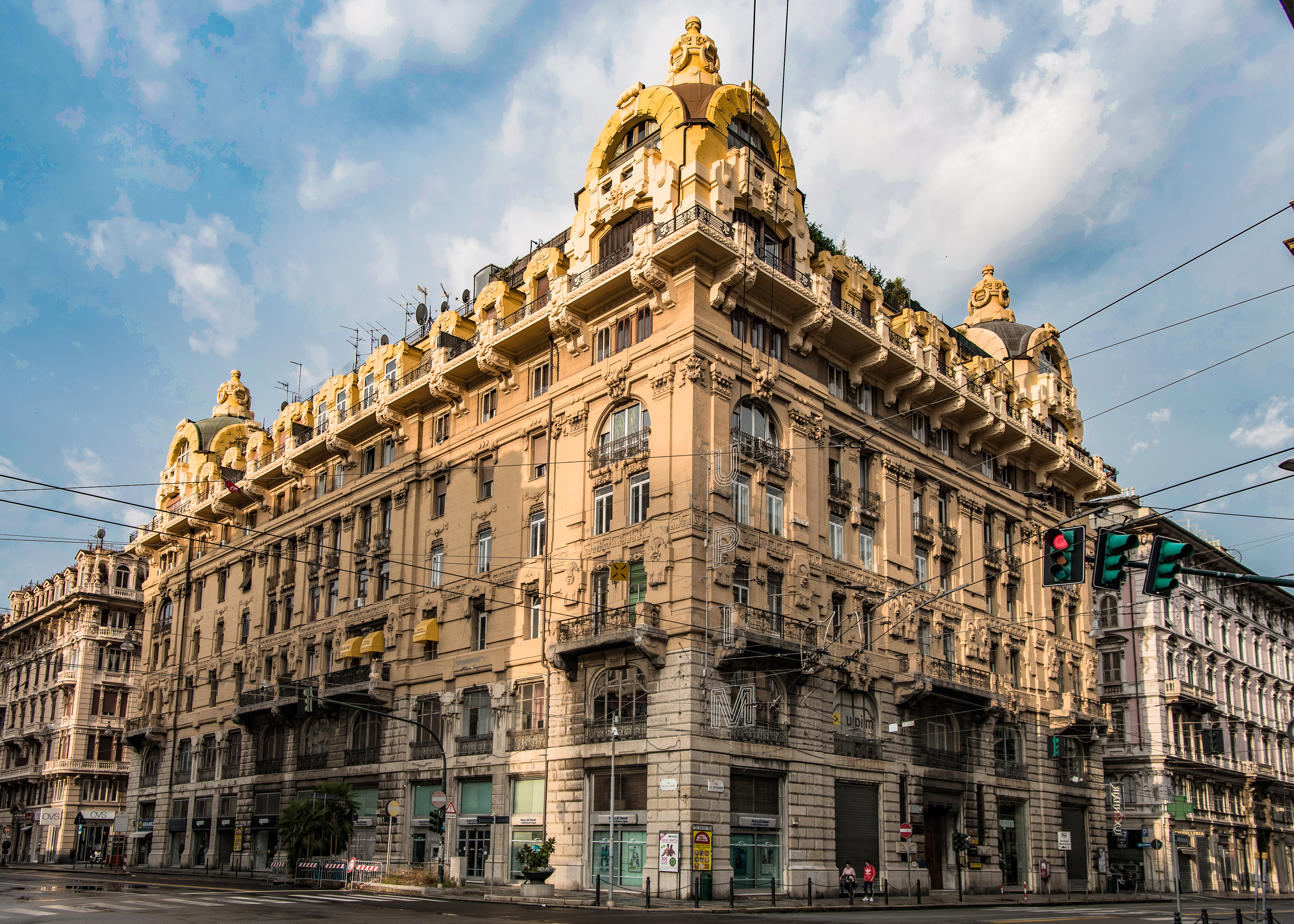
Civic 2

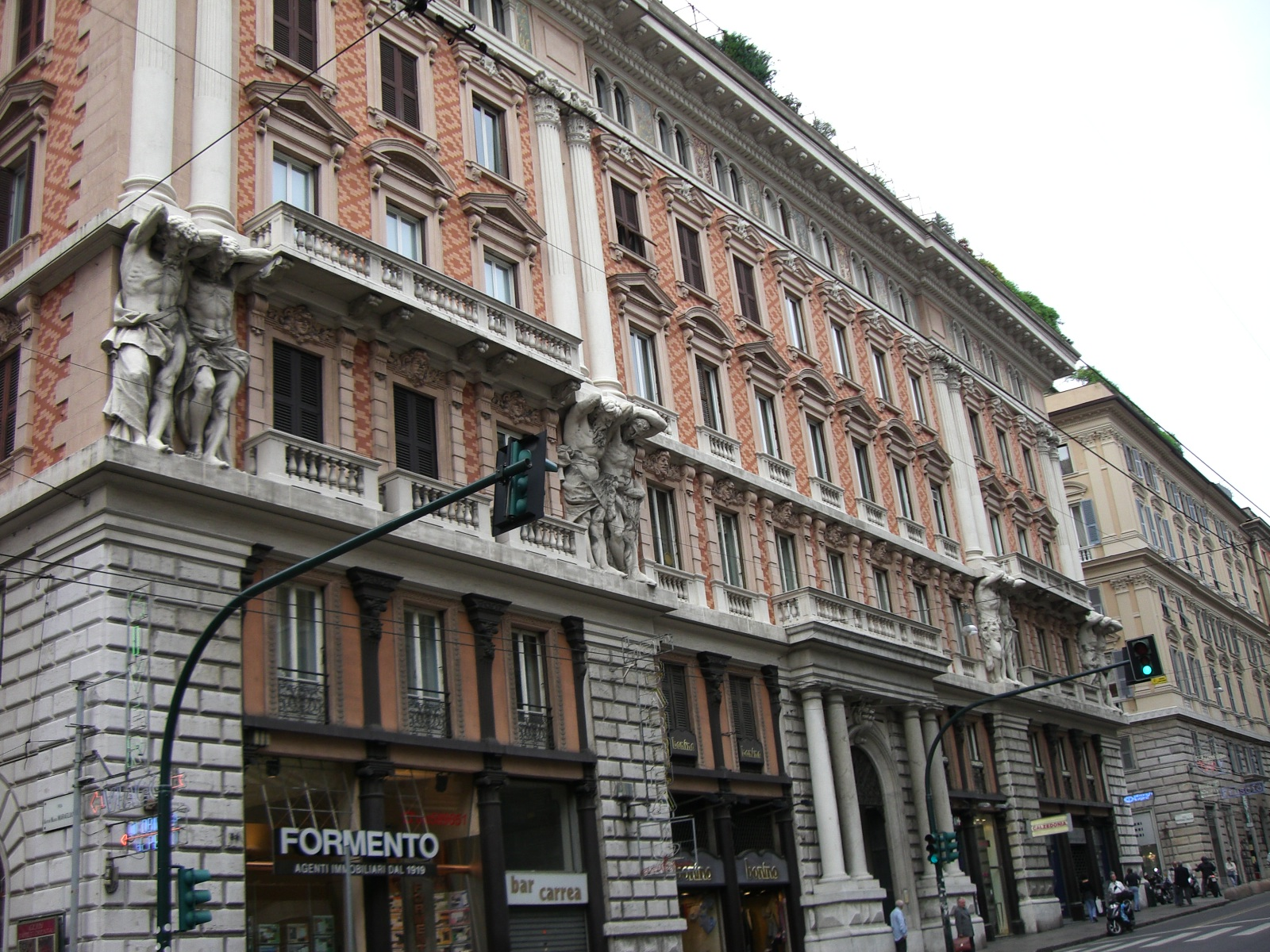
Civic 14

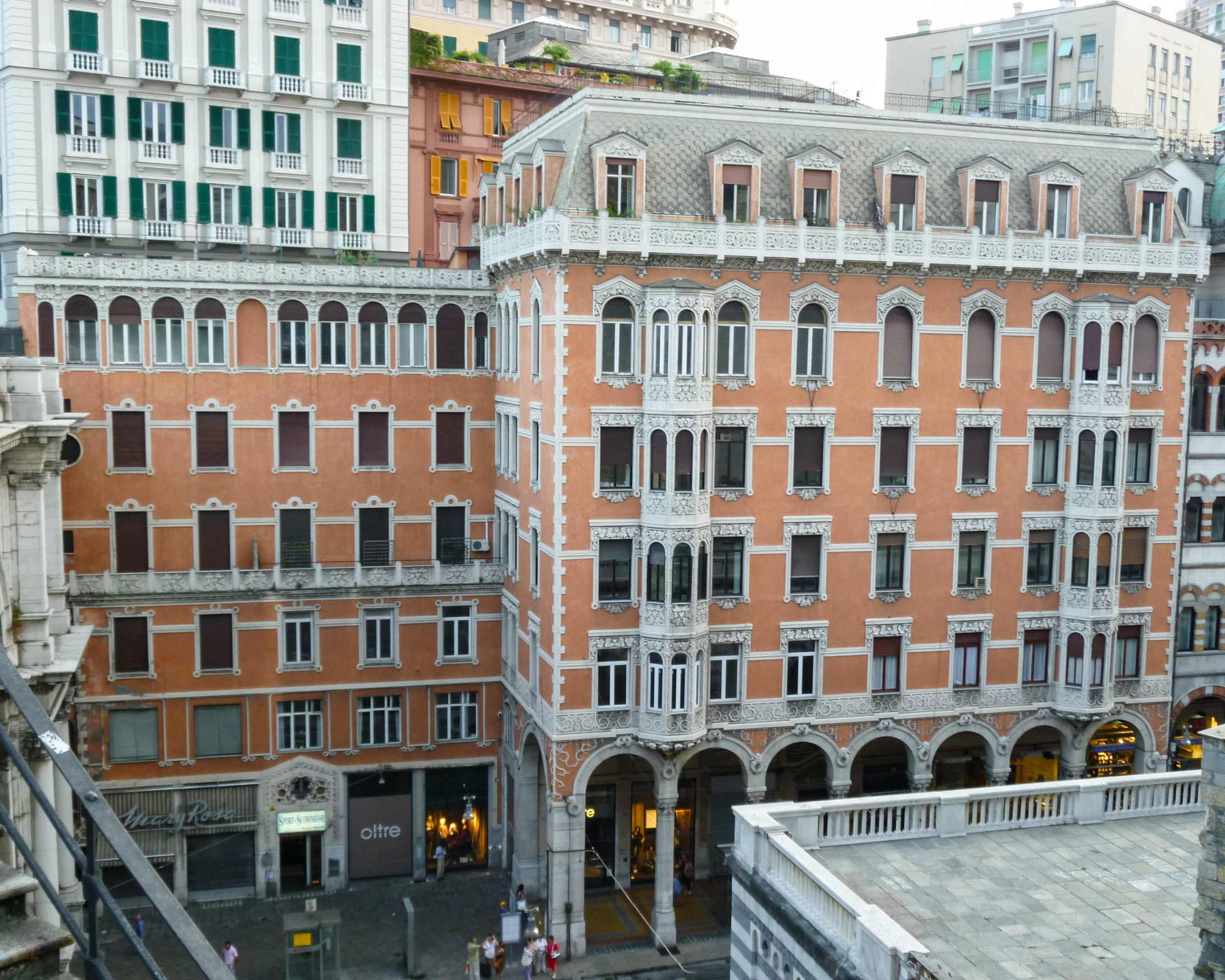
Civic 26

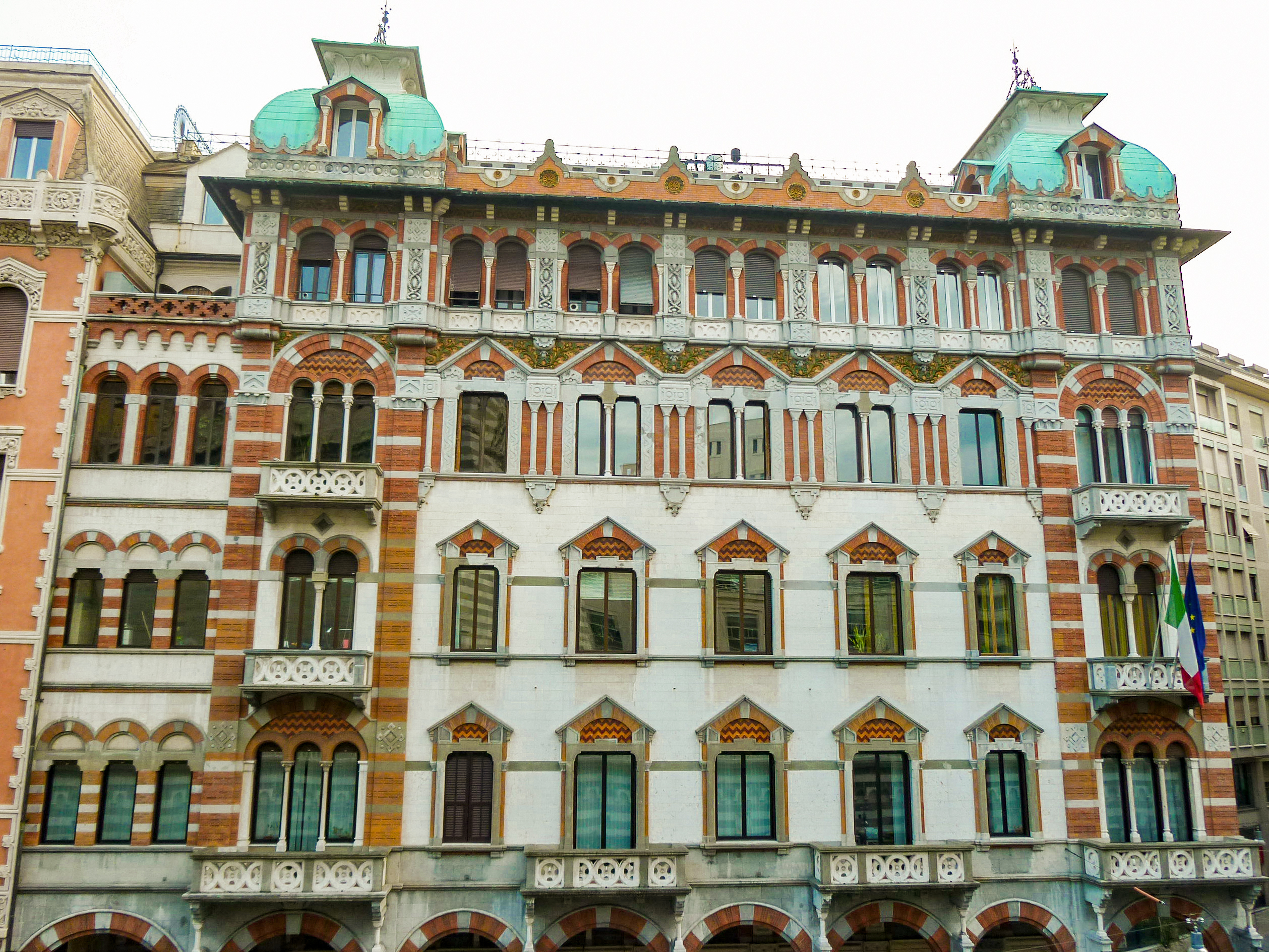
Civic 28

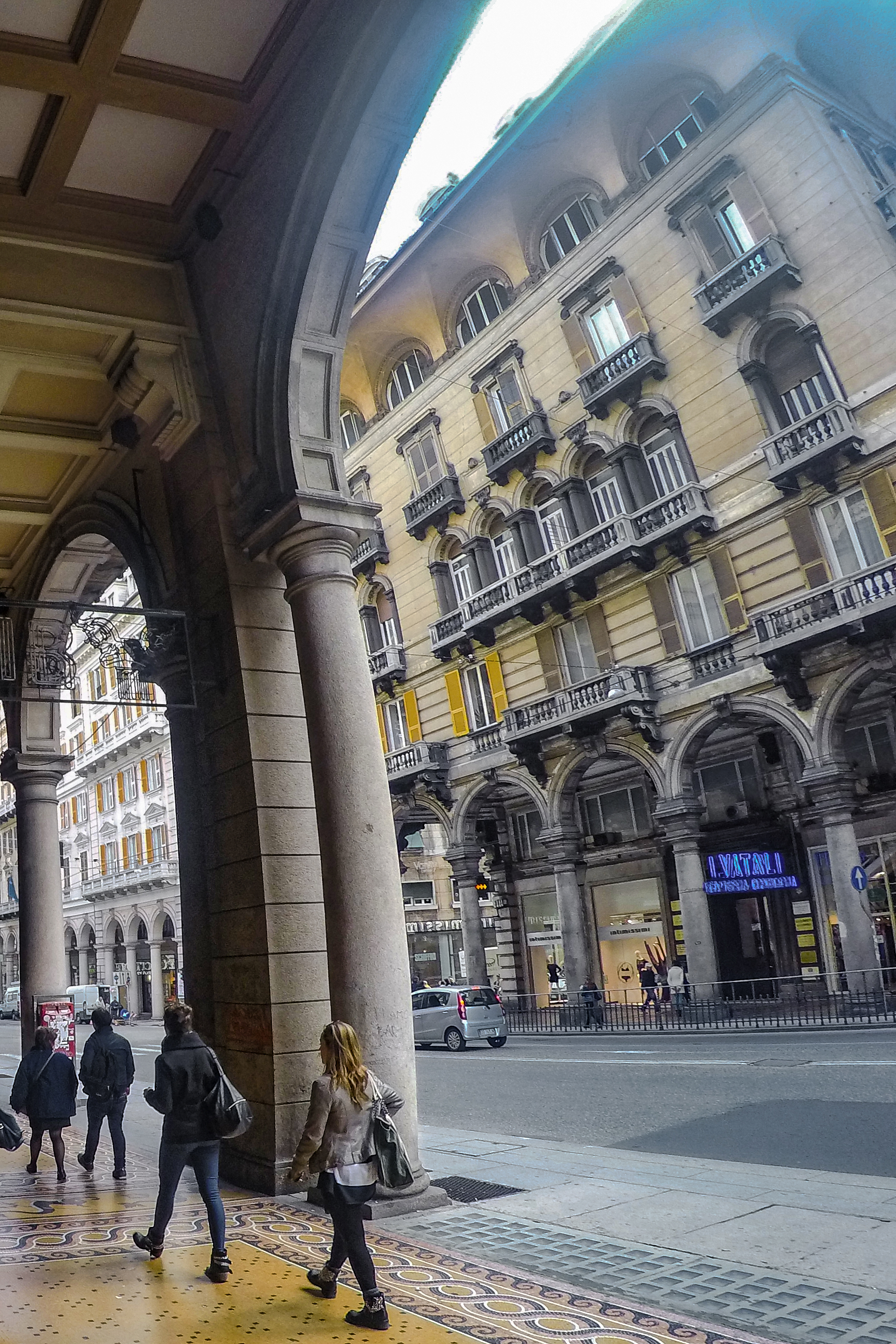
Civic 34

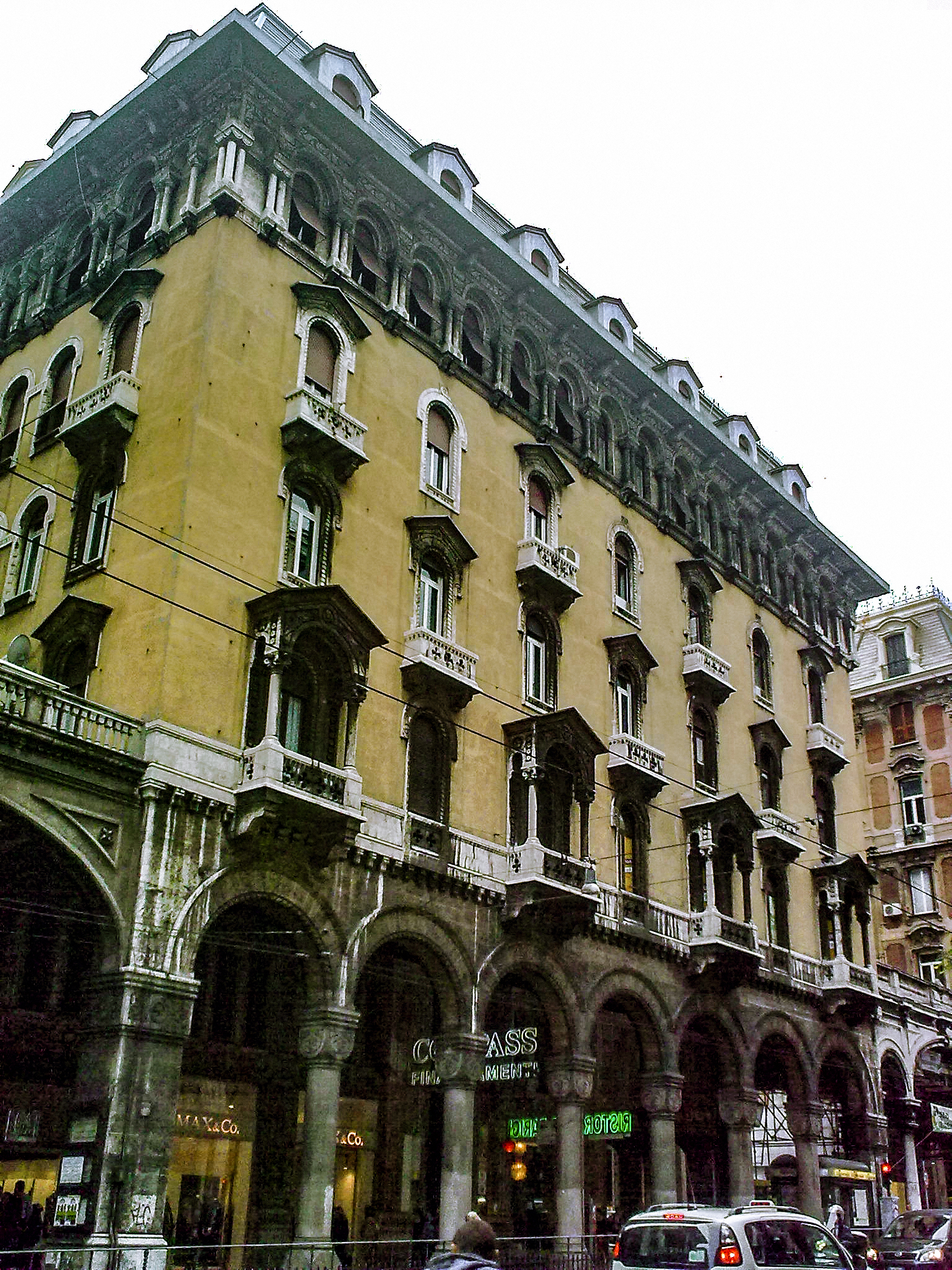
Civic 36

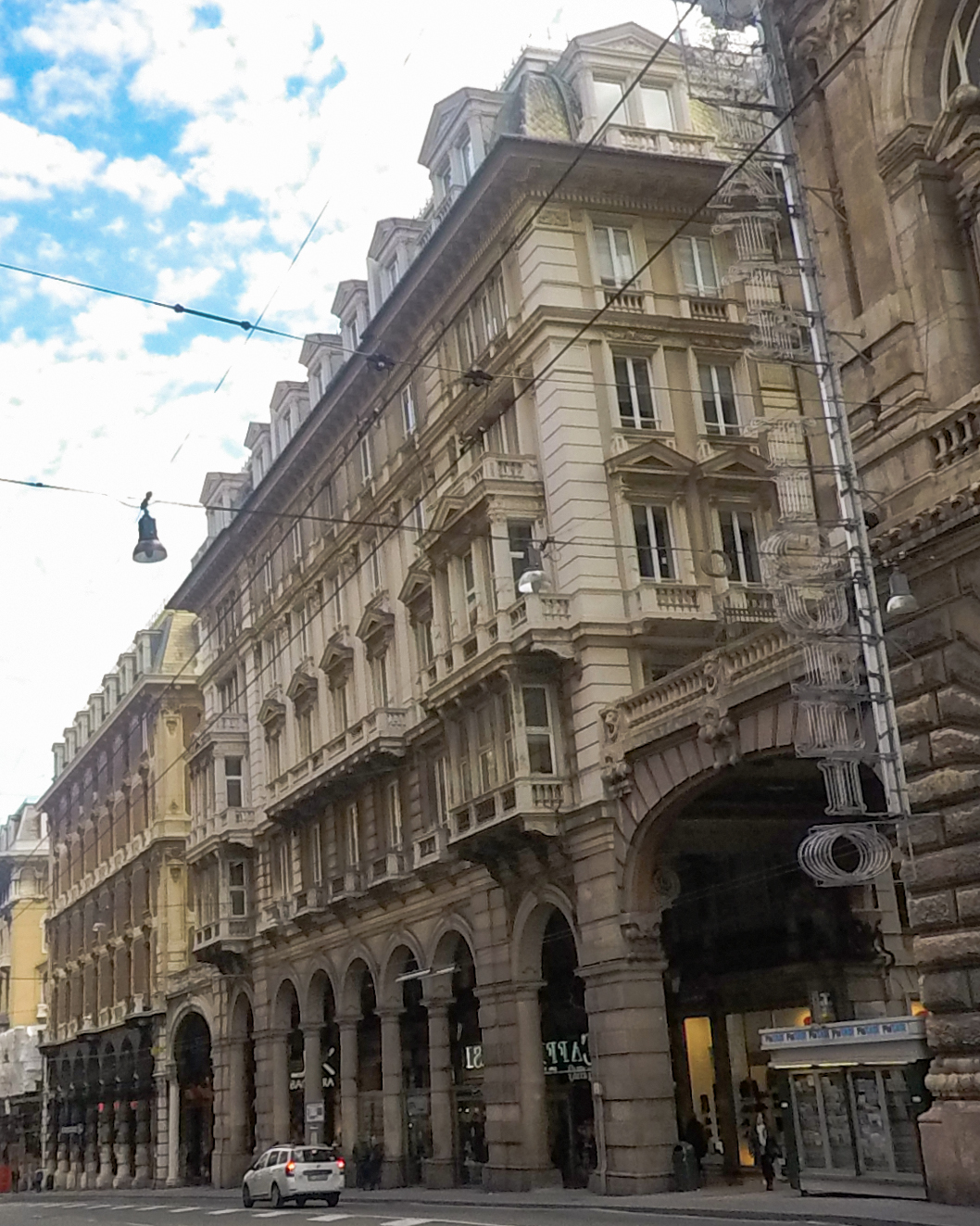
Civic 42

=== Palaces on the North Side ===
- Civic 1 (Cesare Gamba, 1892), is in the classical style and features a tripartite division.
- Civic 3 (Giuseppe Tallero) reflects the refined taste of the late nineteenth century, with plastic decorative elements and projecting bodies and cornices, and is part of the first phase of construction.
- Civic 11–13, known as the Mercato Orientale, is a complex designed to relocate the agricultural market from Piazza De Ferrari. It occupies 5,500 square meters with a circular portico of 360 meters, initially conceived with a metal structure but later built in reinforced concrete.
- Civic 19 (Stefano Cuneo, 1897) has a tripartite facade and detailed decoration with chromatic accents, with a distinctive rounding towards Via della Consolazione.
- Civic 21 (Fratelli Celle, 1896) features a large, austere facade in traditional style, with particularly prominent decorative elements on the doorway and a balustrade on the cornice.
- Civic 23, known as Palazzo Zuccarino-Cerruti (Gino Coppedè, 1912), is the most significant on the north side, near the Monumental Bridge. Built between 1909 and 1913, it has an irregular plan and a facade rich in Liberty-style decorative elements, with Egyptian and Sino-Japanese inspirations.
- Civic 29, Palazzo Orzali (Gaetano Orzali, 1905), is characterized by three large bay windows extending for three floors and notable Liberty-style decorated railings. The atrium features a double-ramp staircase, and the underlying porticos are connected to those of the next building by a wide portal in pink marble.
- Civic 31 and 33 (Dario Carbone) present similar structures and decorations, with facades enlivened by richly decorated bay windows.
- Civic 35, known as the Hotel Bristol Palace (Dario Carbone, 1905), was designed and inaugurated in 1905 as the location for a luxurious hotel.
- Civic 37 (Dario Carbone, 1905) is another Liberty-style building, designed in the style of the previous one.
- Civic 41 is the post-war reconstruction (1951) of the original building, destroyed during the Second World War. Overlooking Piazza De Ferrari with a curved facade, it is topped by a dome and houses the Genoese offices of La Repubblica and Telenord.
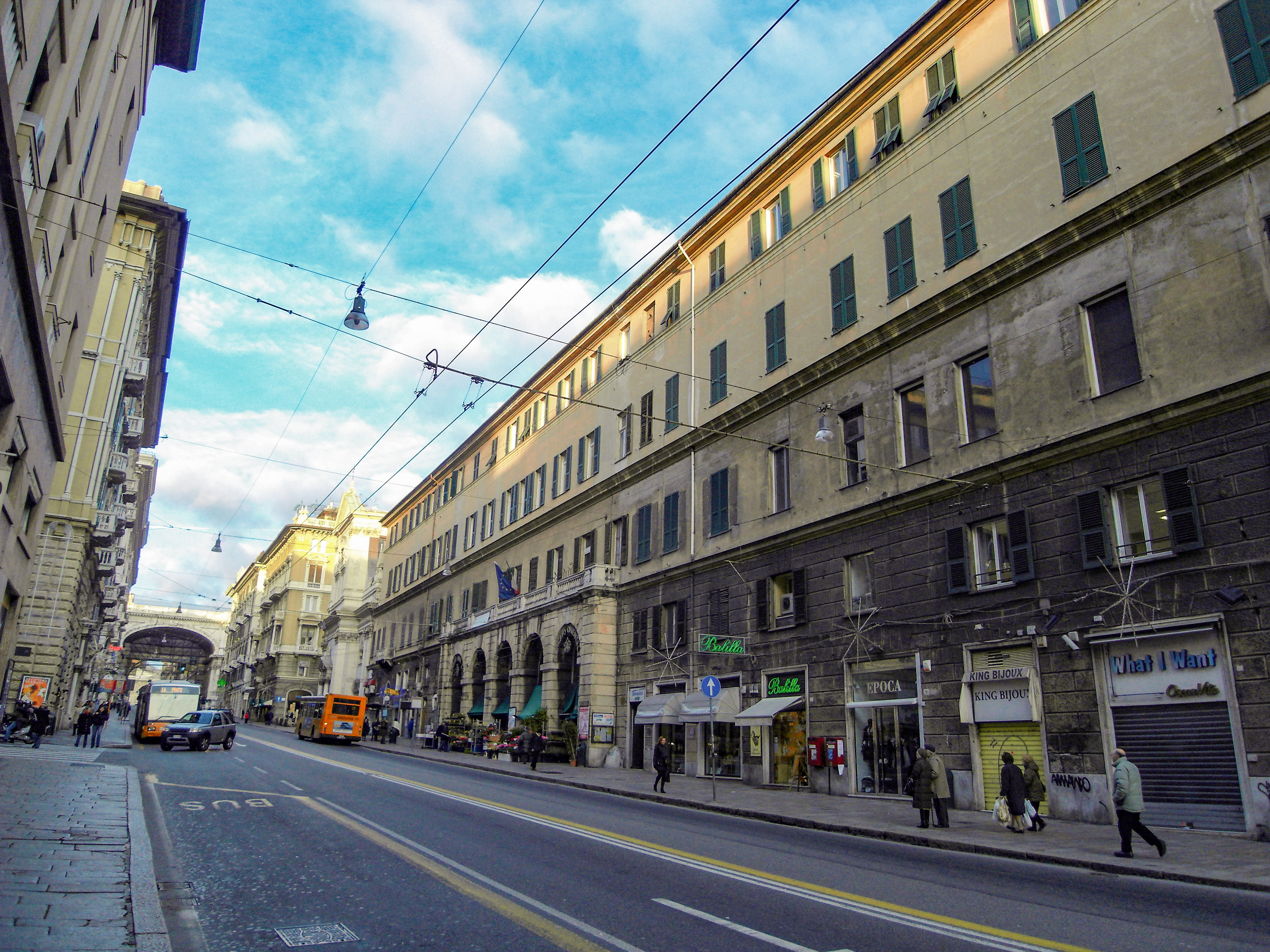
Civics 11–13, Mercato Orientale

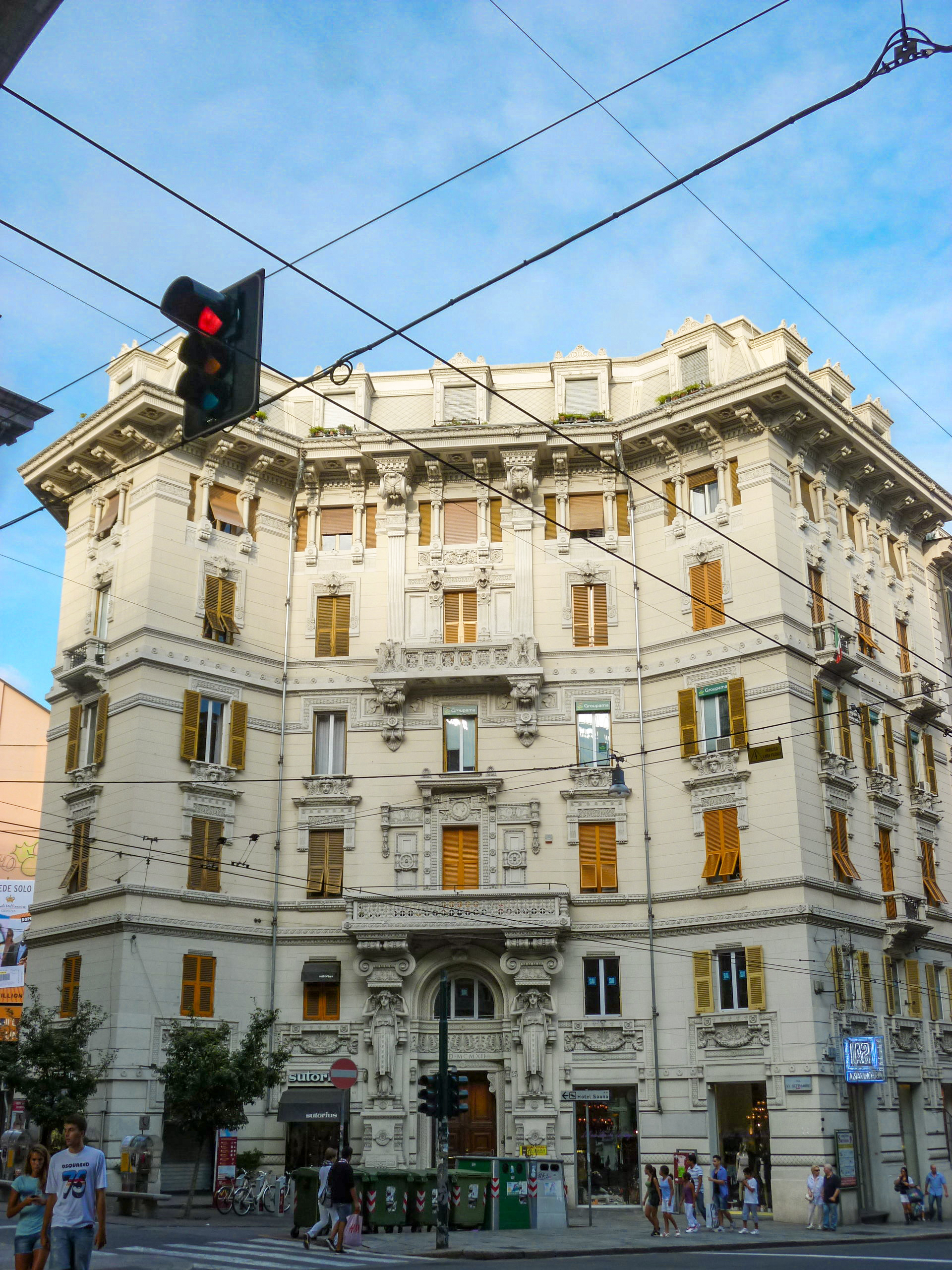
Palazzo Zuccarino-Cerruti, civics 23

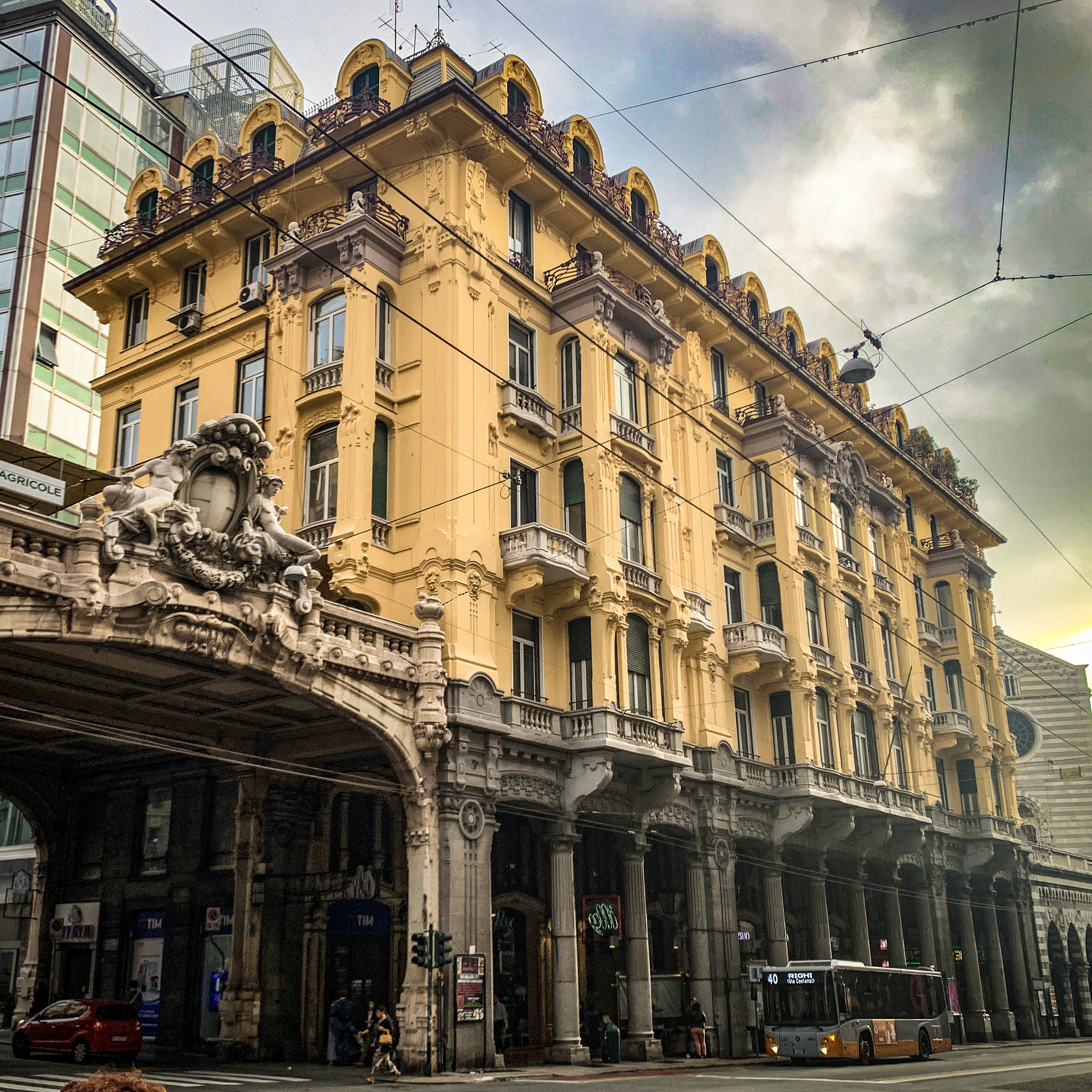
Civic 29, by Gaetano Orzali

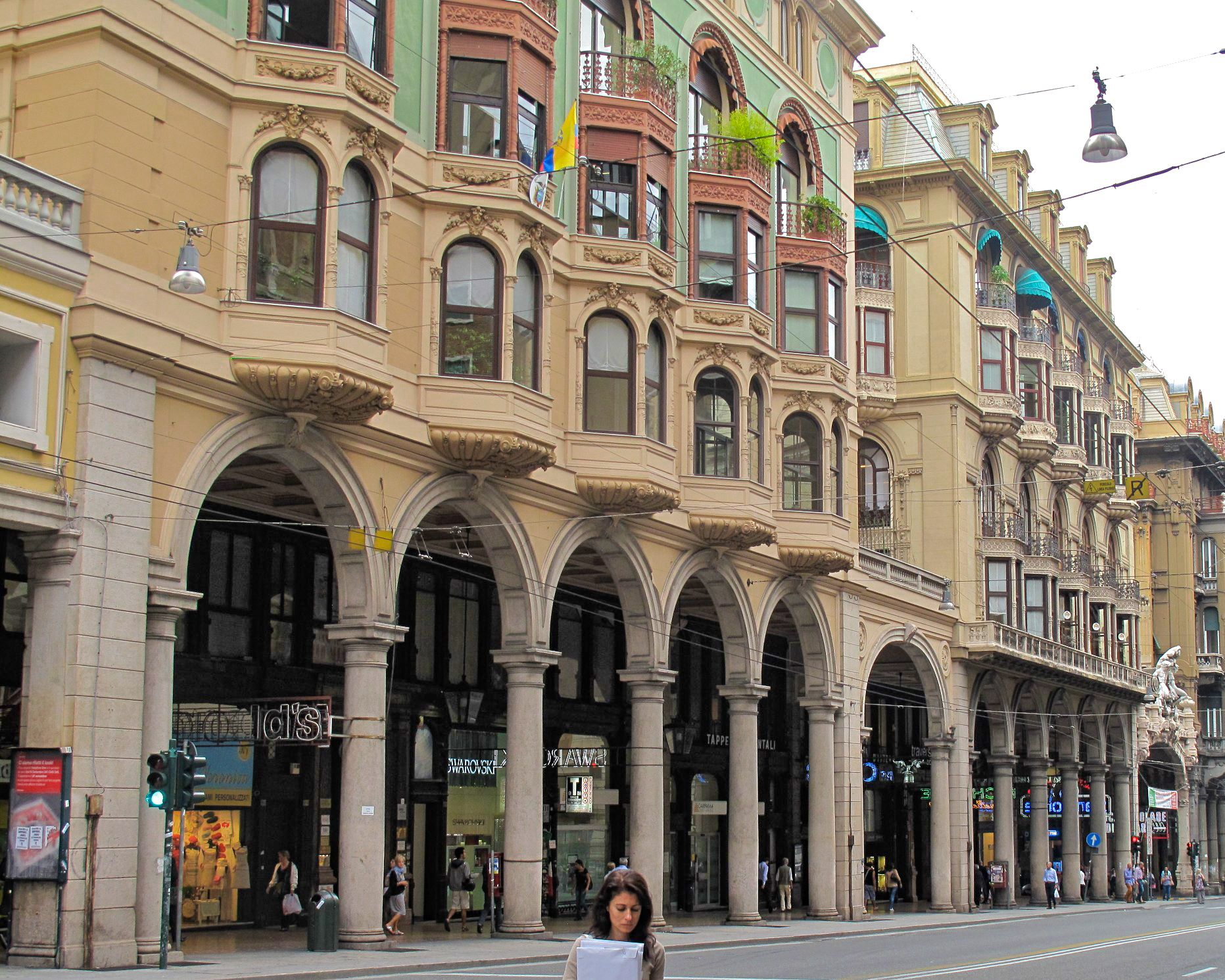
Civics 31–33

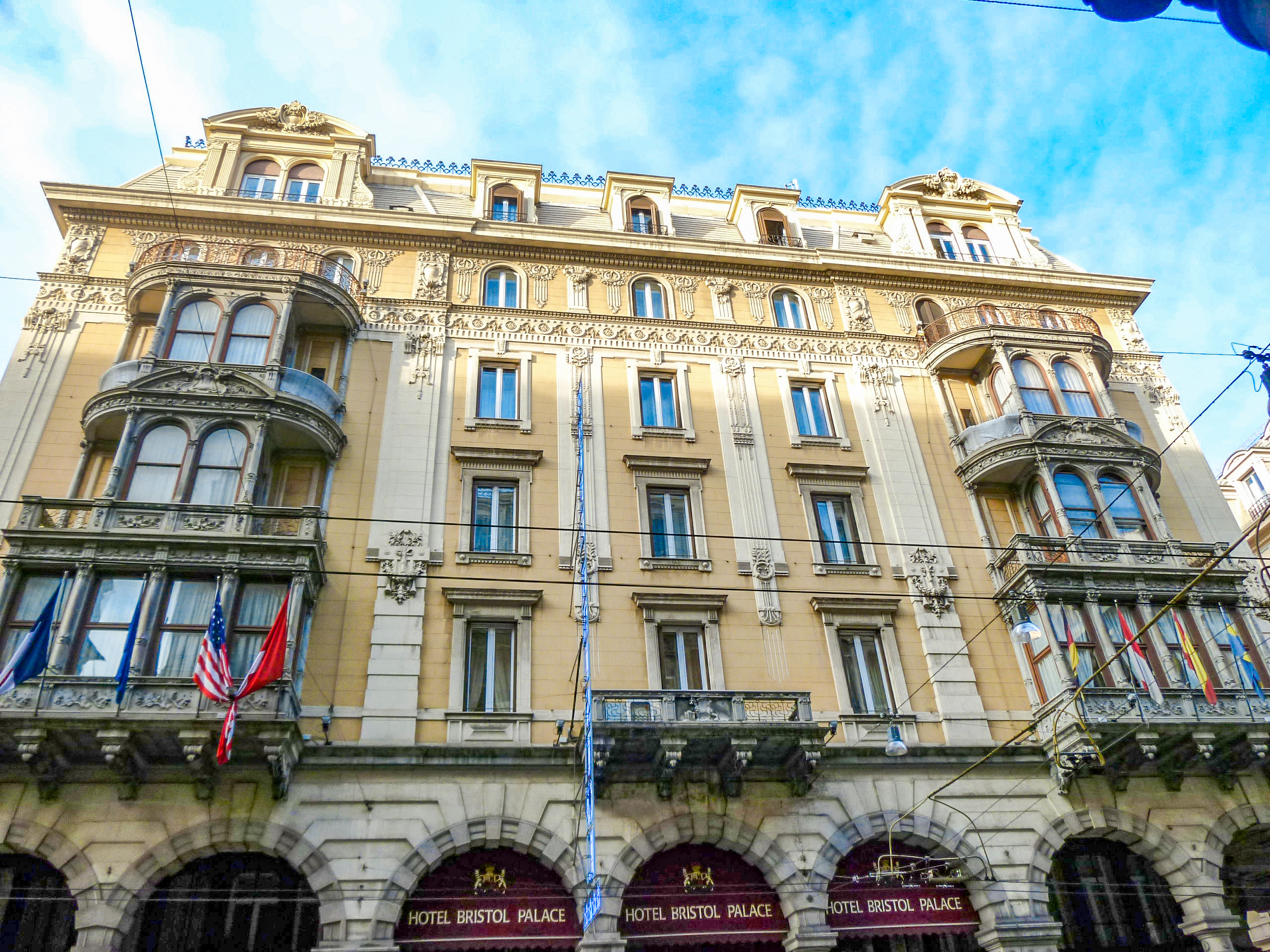
Civic 35, Hotel Bristol Palace

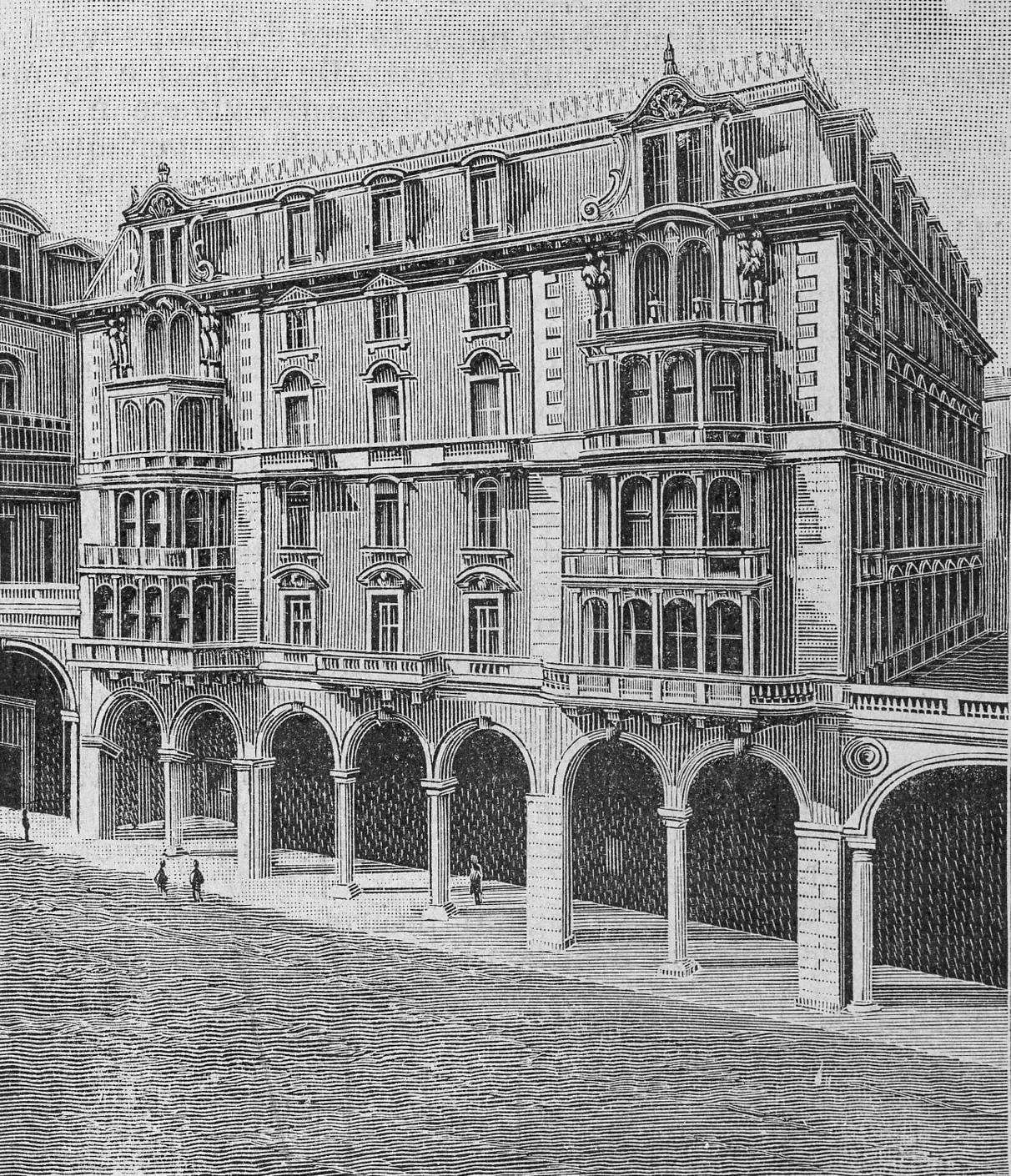
Civic 37

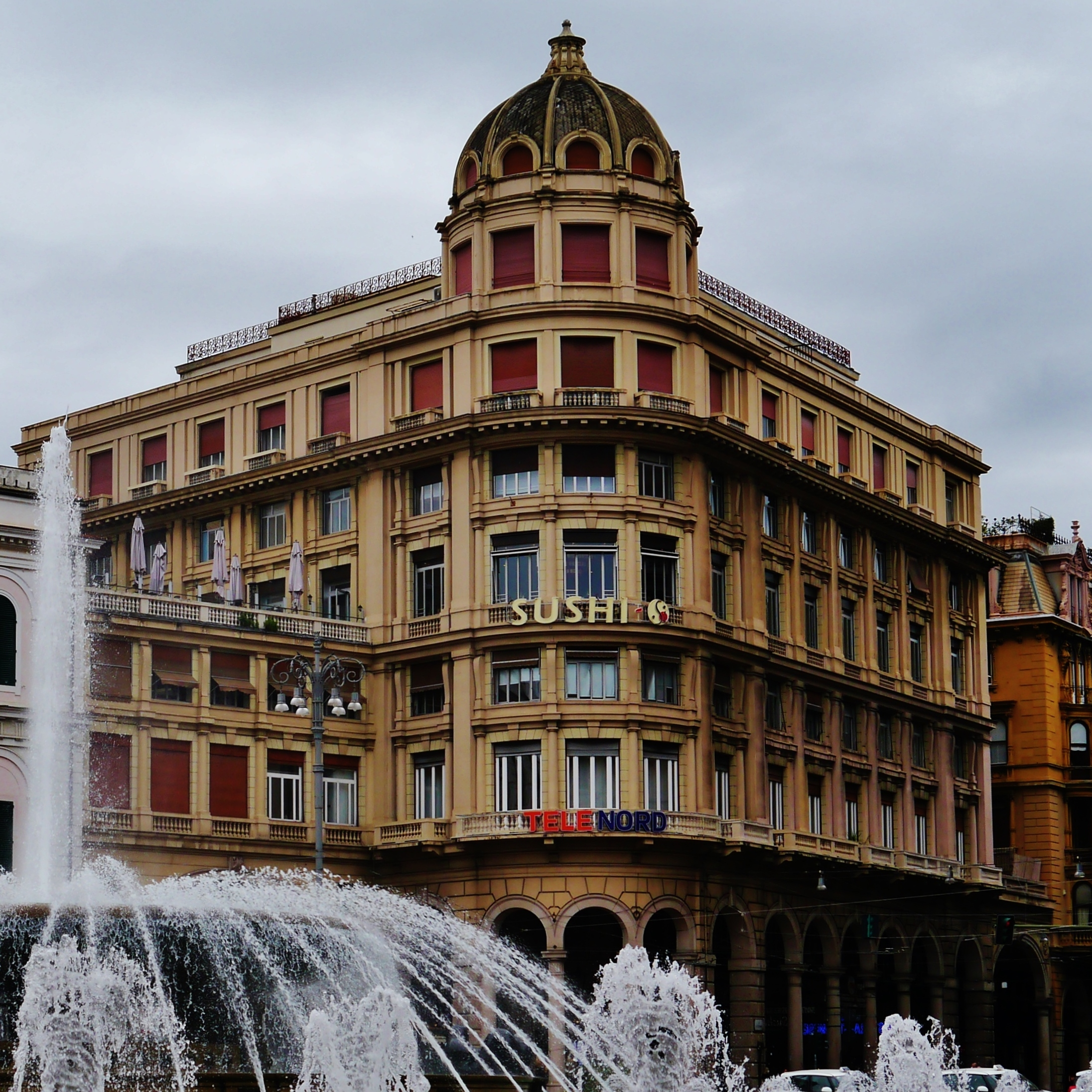
Civic 41 from piazza De Ferrari

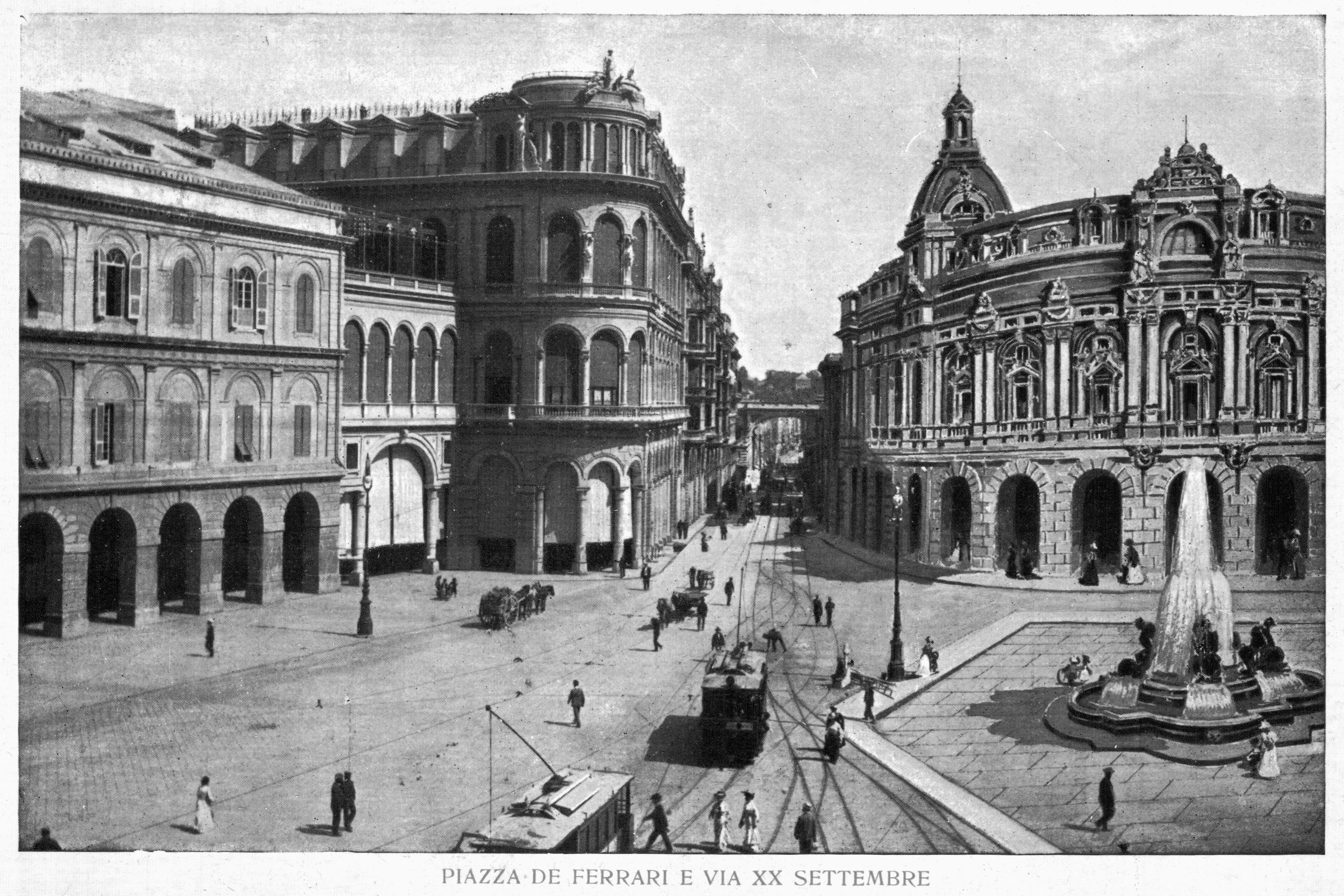
Civic 41, before Bombing of Genoa in World War II

== Monumental Bridge ==
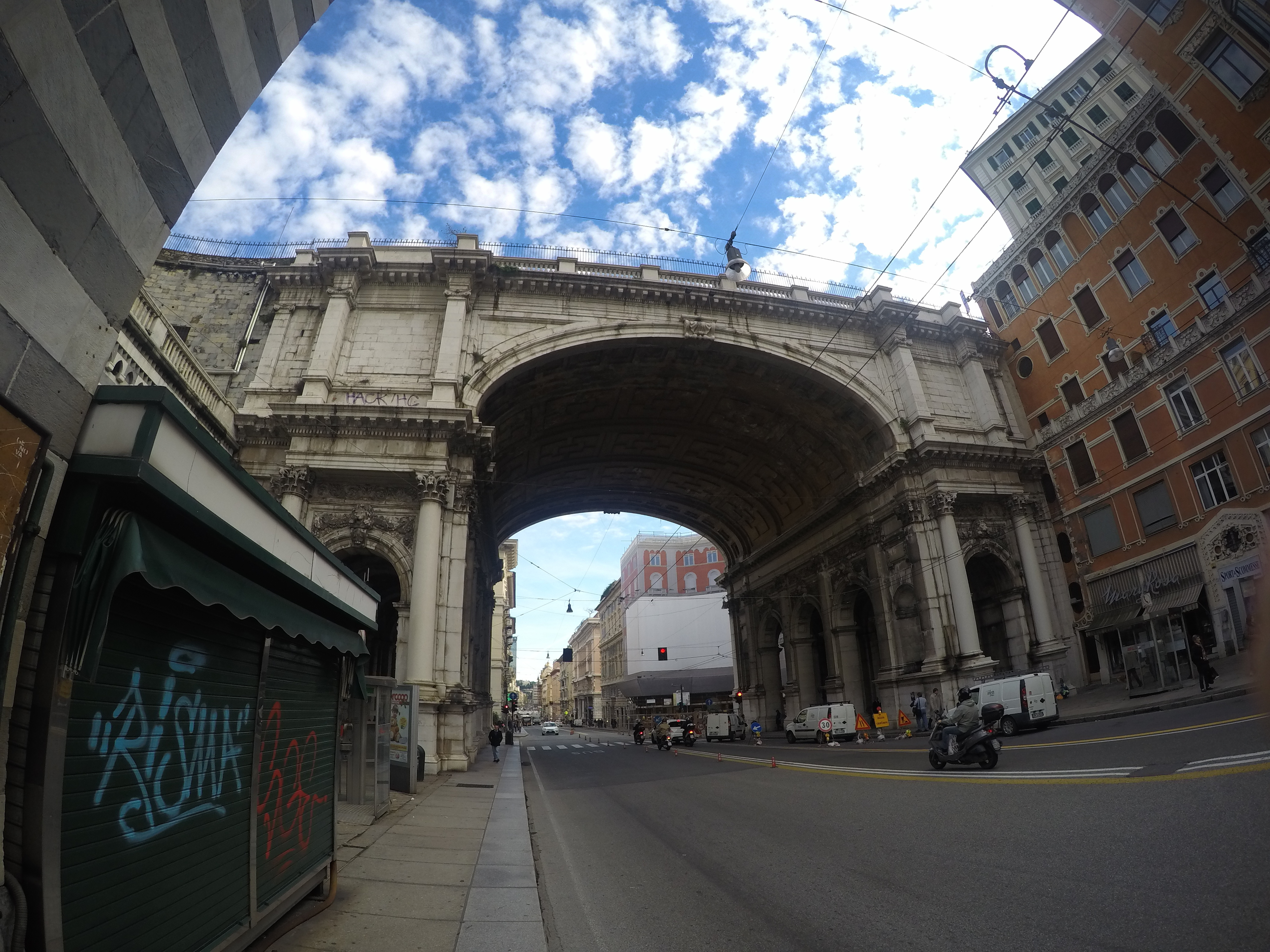
The Monumental Bridge

The Monumental Bridge, connecting the walls of Acquasola with those of S. Chiara, was built according to the design of Cesare Gamba and Riccardo Haupt between 1893 and 1895, replacing the Porta degli Archi, dismantled and rebuilt on the Walls of Prato. On the bridge, which crosses Via XX Settembre, runs Corso Andrea Podestà, which runs along the bastions of the sixteenth-century walls and connects Piazza Corvetto with the area of Carignano. Becoming one of the symbolic places of the modern city, it divides the Portoria area from that of S. Vincenzo and offers an excellent view over the underlying Via XX Settembre. The bridge, 21 meters high above the street level of Via XX Settembre, is built of stone and bricks, following the typology of the railway arches in use at that time, but was later externally clad in white stone from Mazzano.

In 1949, the two side arches, decorated with statues by Nino Servettaz, were dedicated to the fallen for freedom: some epigraphs remember the names of the Resistance fighters, the surrender of the German troops under General Meinhold to the Ligurian National Liberation Committee (25 April 1945), and the text of the motivation for which Genoa was awarded the gold medal of the Resistance in 1947.

== Bibliography ==
- Anna Maria Nicoletti (1993). Via XX Settembre a Genova, la costruzione della città tra Otto e Novecento. Sagep. ISBN 8870585077.
- Sei itinerari in Portoria (PDF). Genova: Edizione Samizdat. 1997.
