= Hotel Bristol Palace =

Hotel in Genoa, Italy

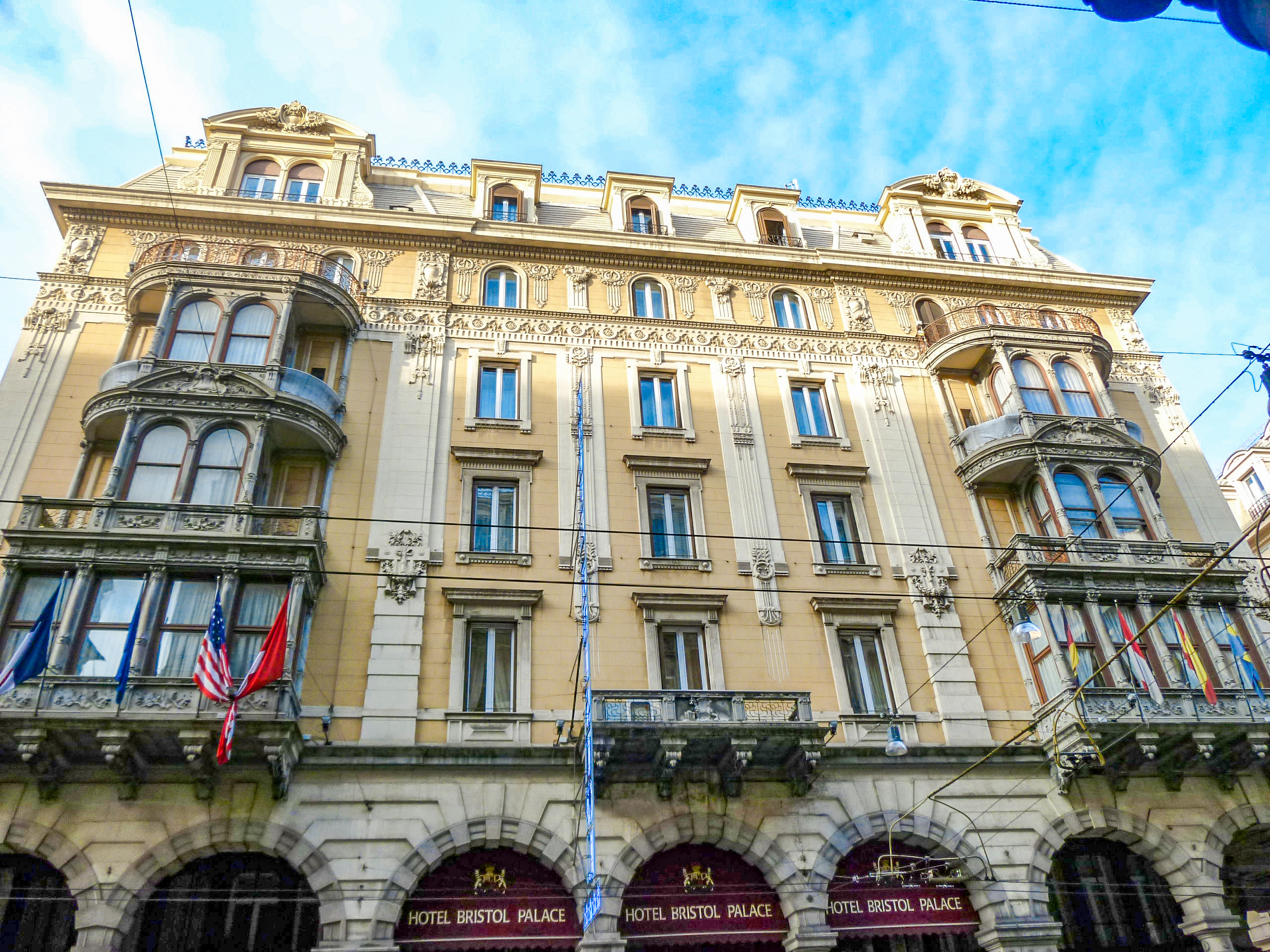
- Bristol Palace Hotel on Via XX Settembre in Genoa, Italy (photographed in 2011)
- Interactive map of the Hotel Bristol Palace area
- Hotel chain: Gruppo Duetorrihotels Spa

General information
- Coordinates: 44.40688°N 8.936267°E
- Opened: 1905; 121 years ago

Design and construction
- Architect: Dario Carbone

Website
- www.hotelbristolpalace.it

Hotel Bristol Palace is a 5-star Luxury hotel in Genoa, Italy on Via XX Settembre.

== History ==
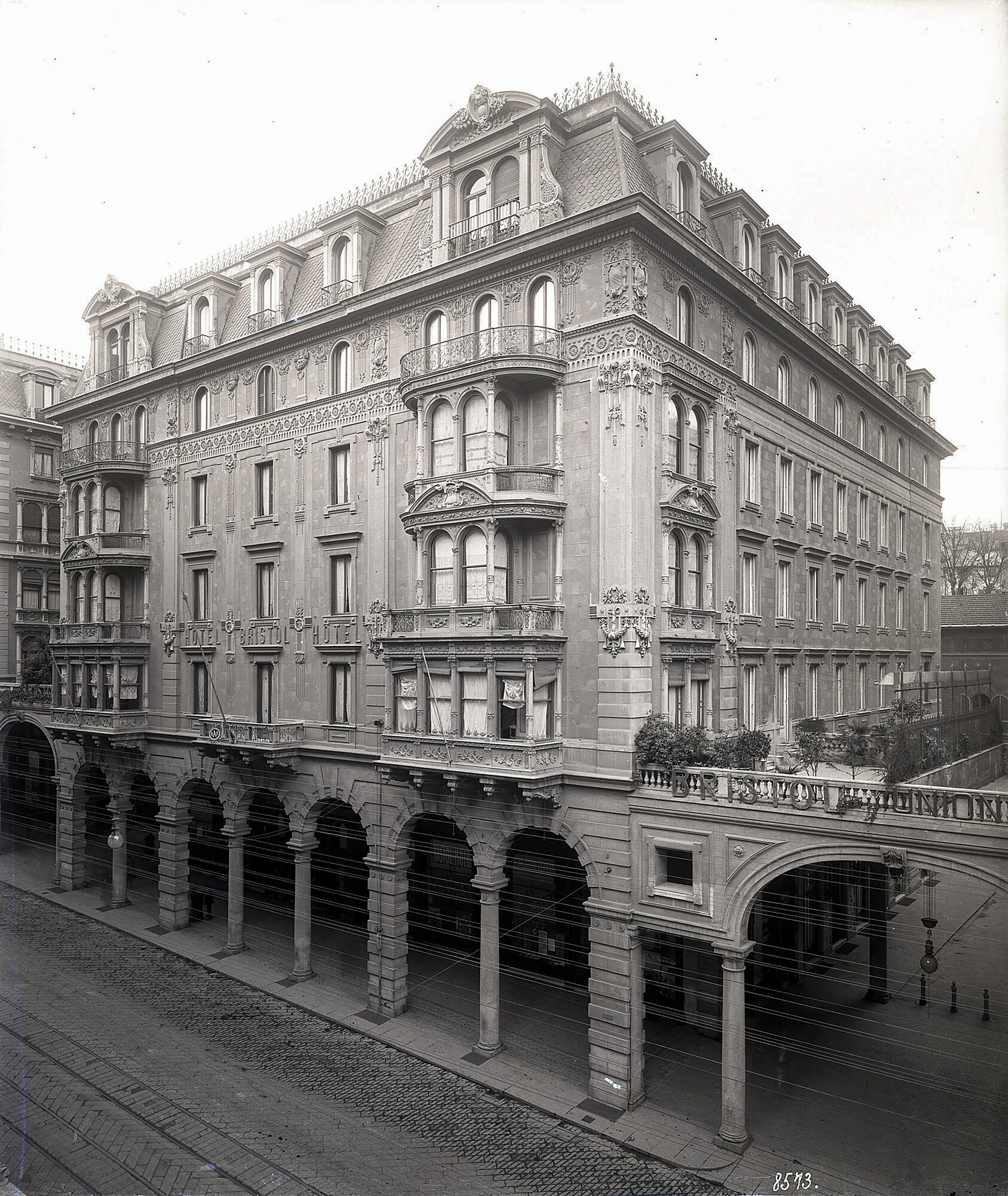
The hotel sometime between 1905 and 1925

The hotel was designed by Dario Carbone and built in 1905.

During World War 2, it housed the German command. At the end of the war, it housed the National Liberation Committee.

The hotel has hosted famous and notable guests such as the Emperor of Japan Hirohito and the writers Edmondo De Amicis, Luigi Pirandello and Gabriele D'Annunzio. In 1926, Alfred Hitchcock stayed in the hotel during the filming The Pleasure Garden.

The hotel is managed by Gruppo Duetorrihotels Spa.

== Gallery ==
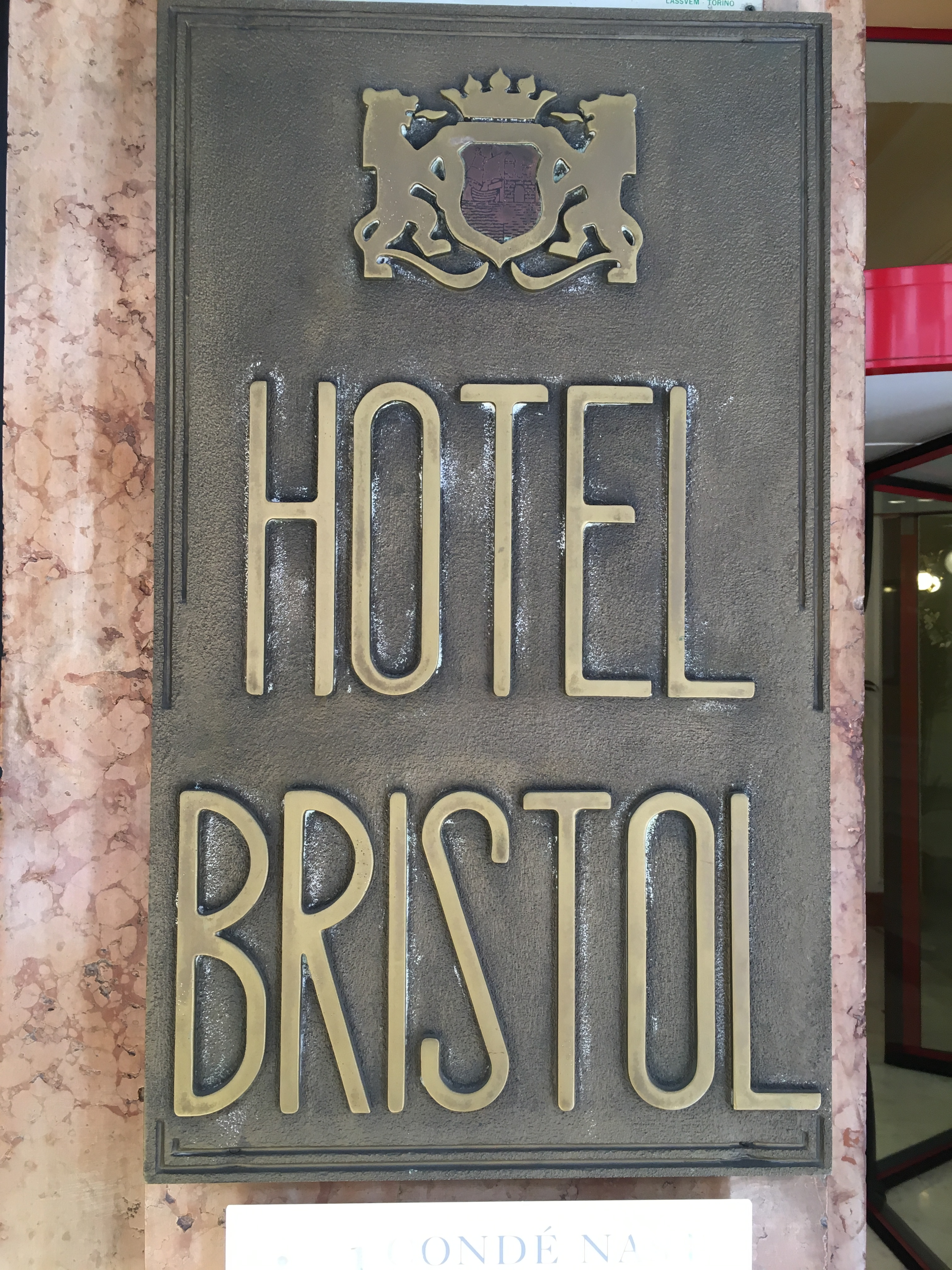
Sign of the Hotel

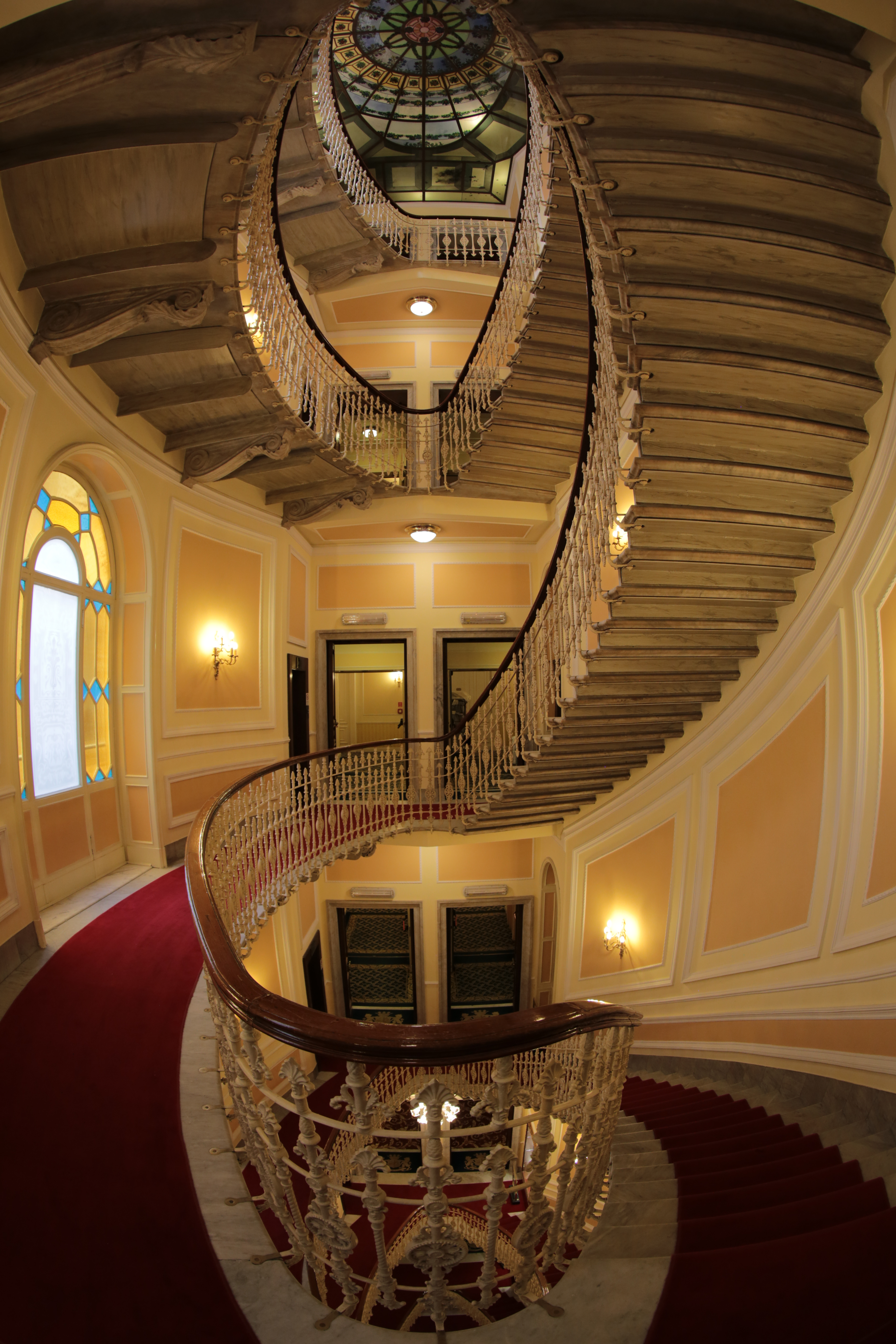
The staircase in the hotel, photographed from the 5th floor in 2016

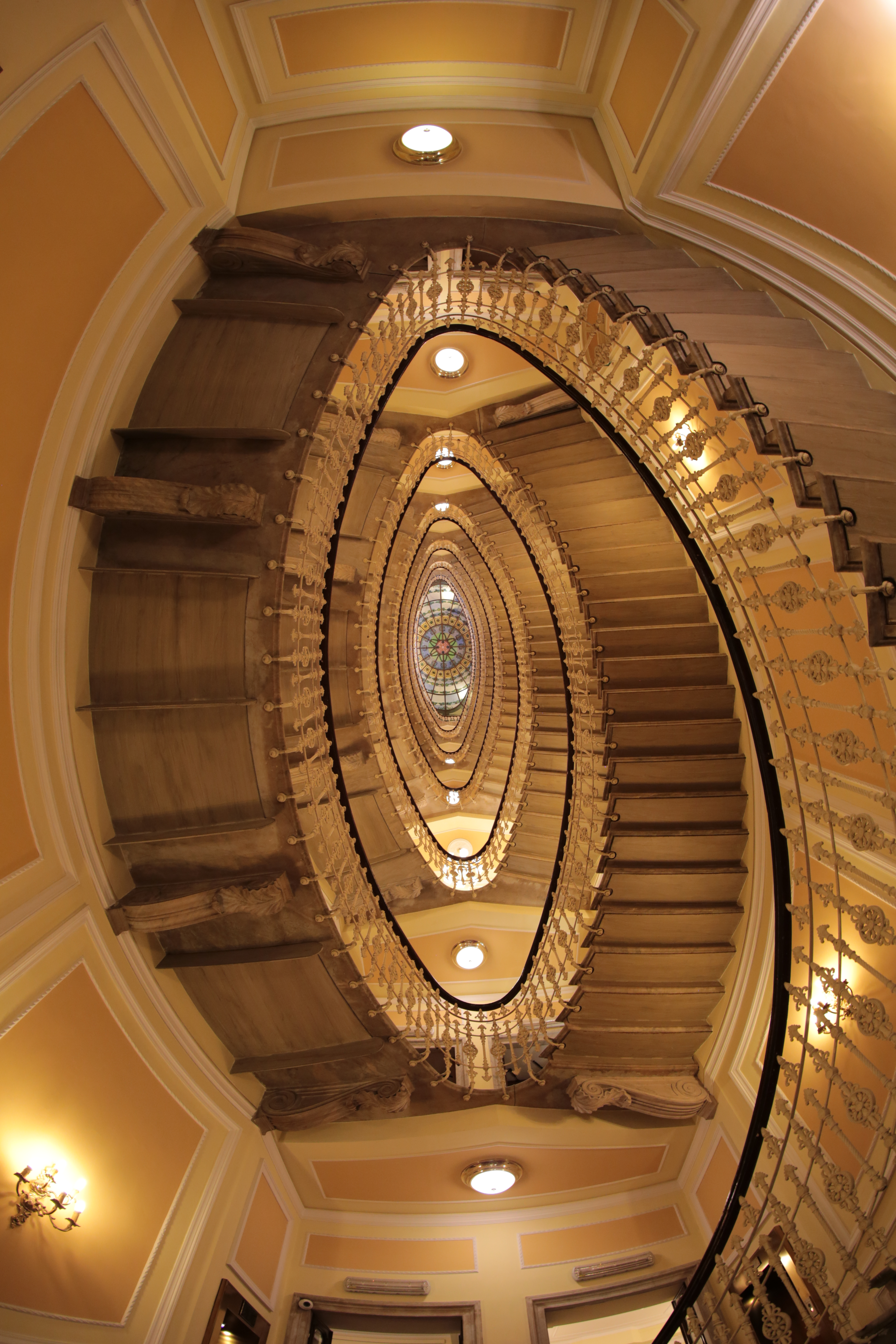
The staircase in the hotel, photographed from the ground floor looking up in 2016

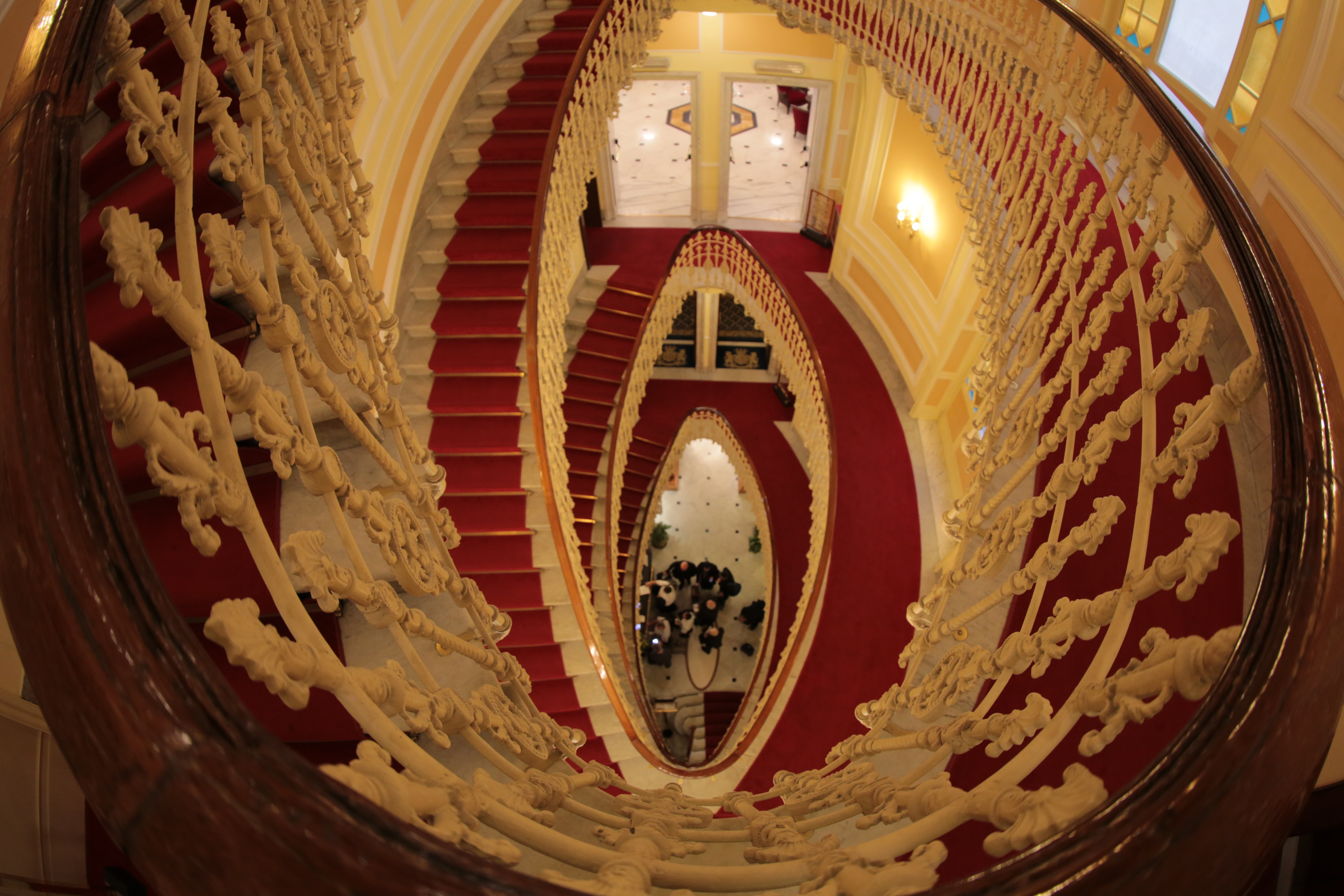
The staircase in the hotel, photographed from the second floor looking down in 2016

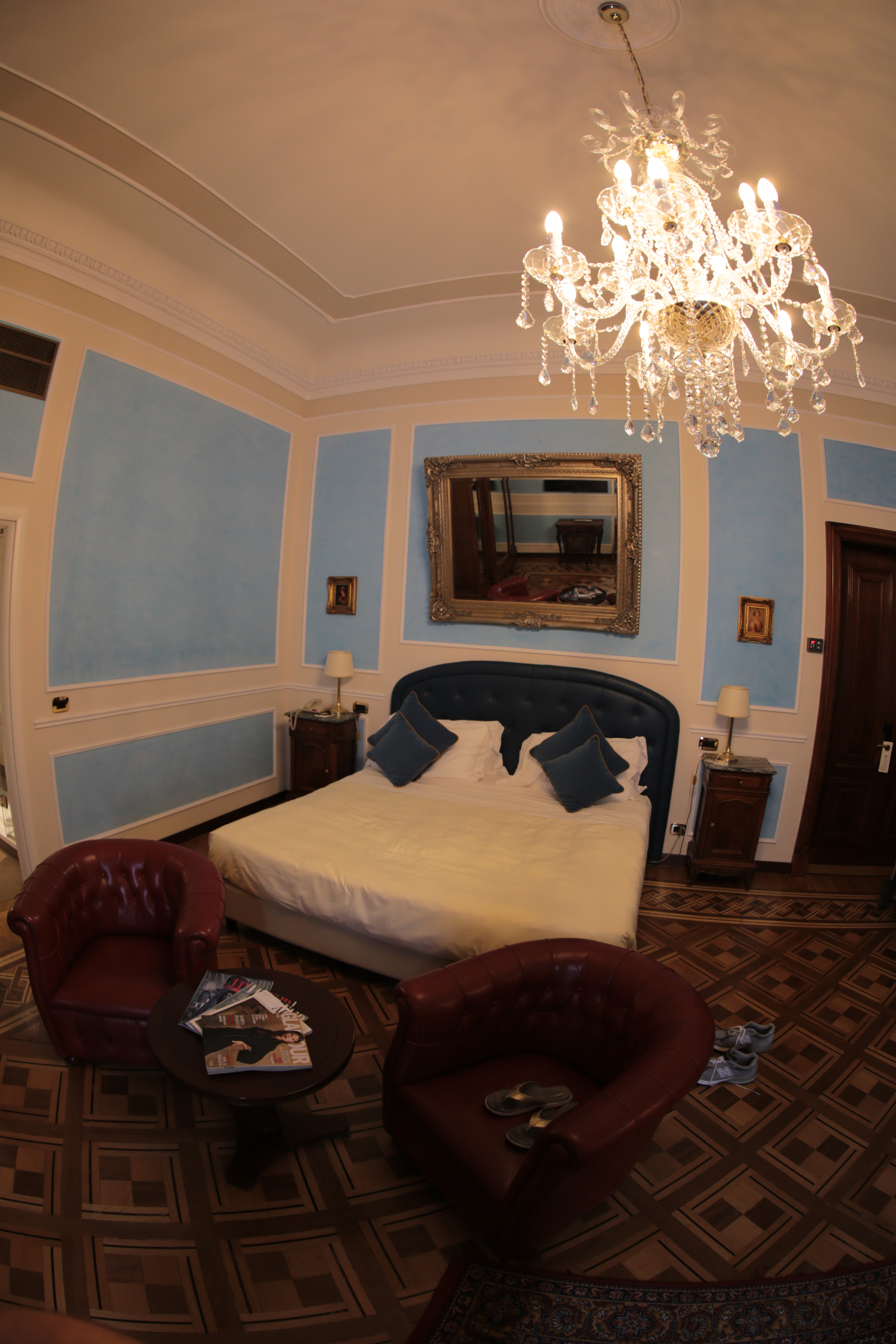
Room in the hotel, photographed in 2016

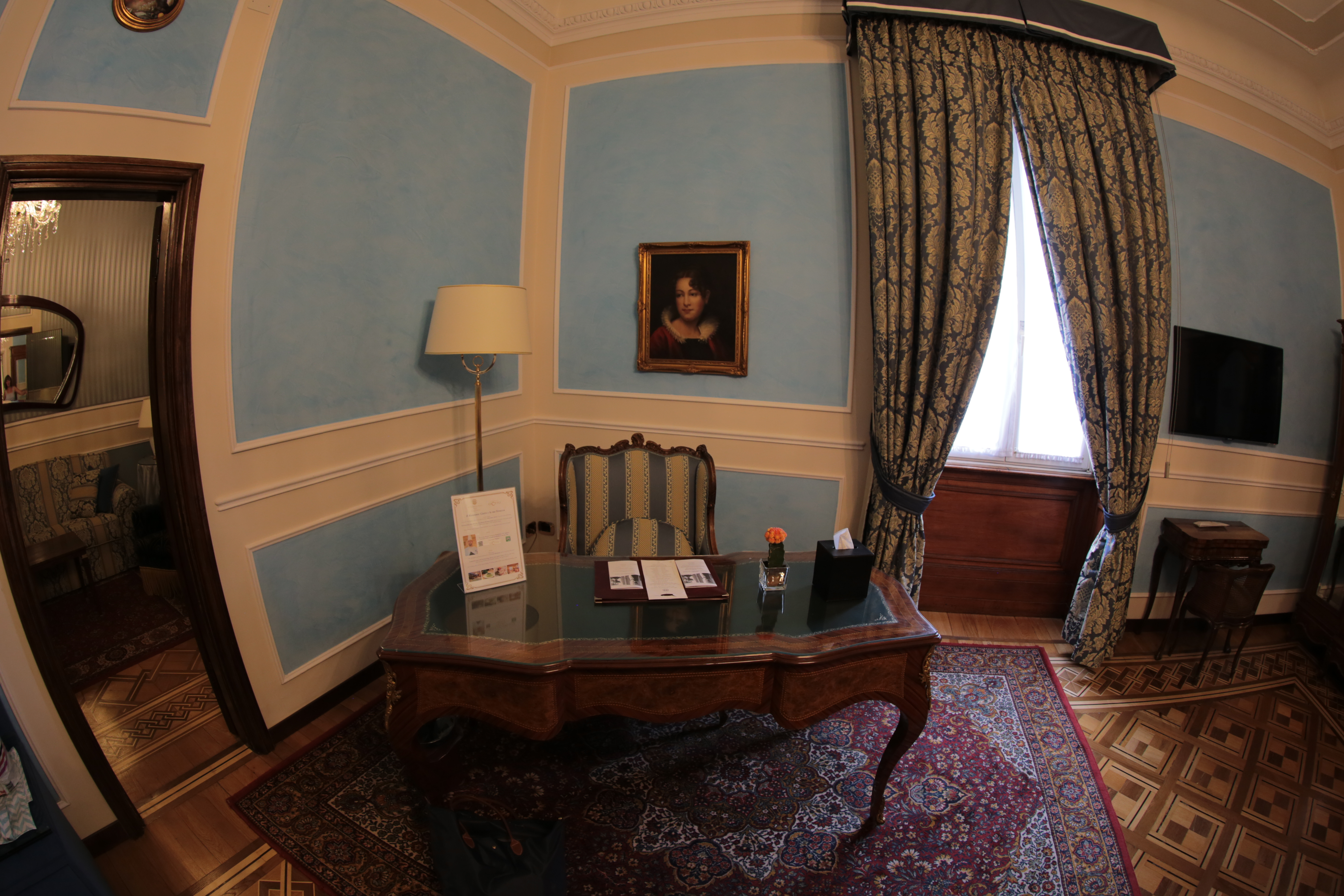
Room in the hotel, photographed in 2016

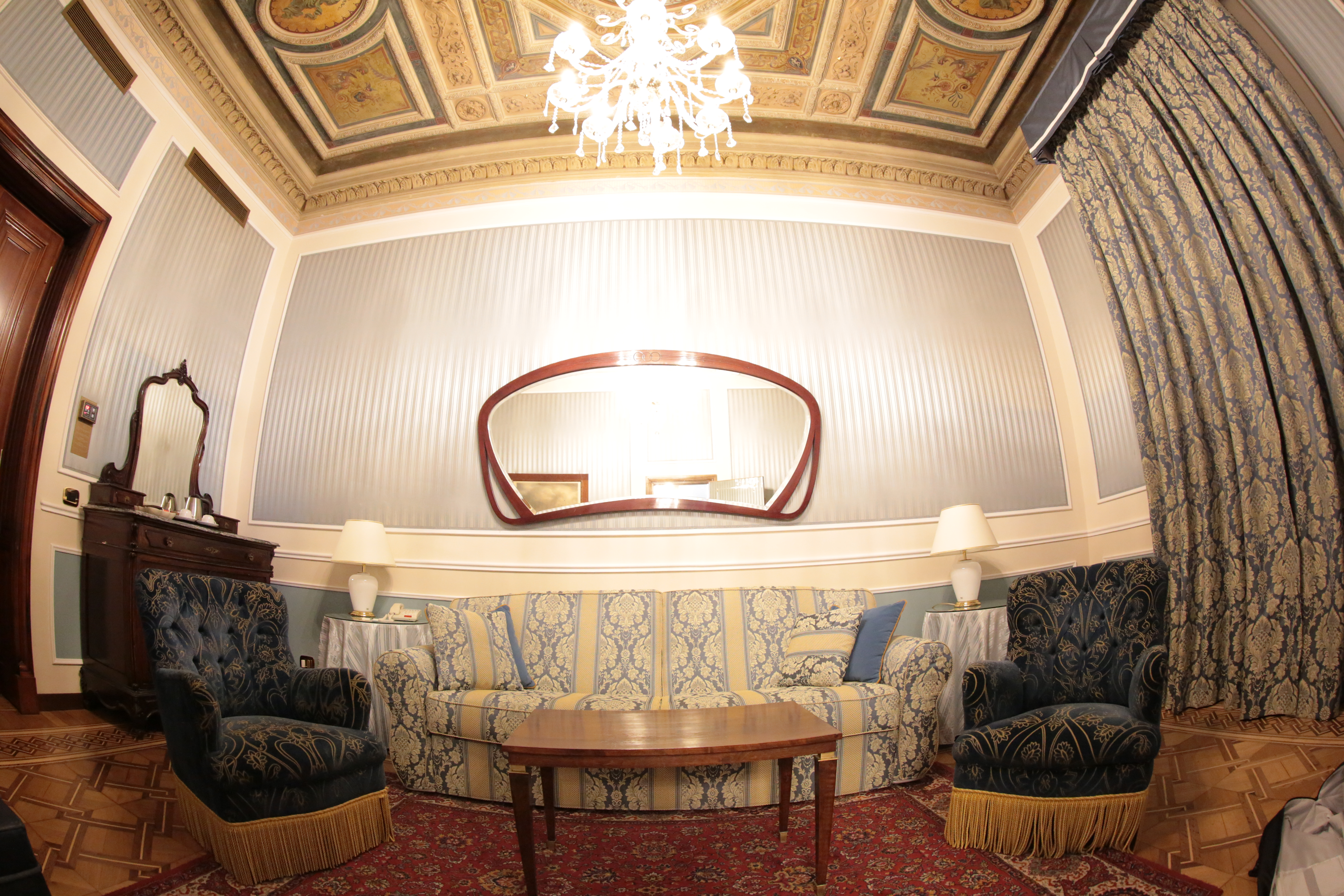
Room in the hotel, photographed in 2016

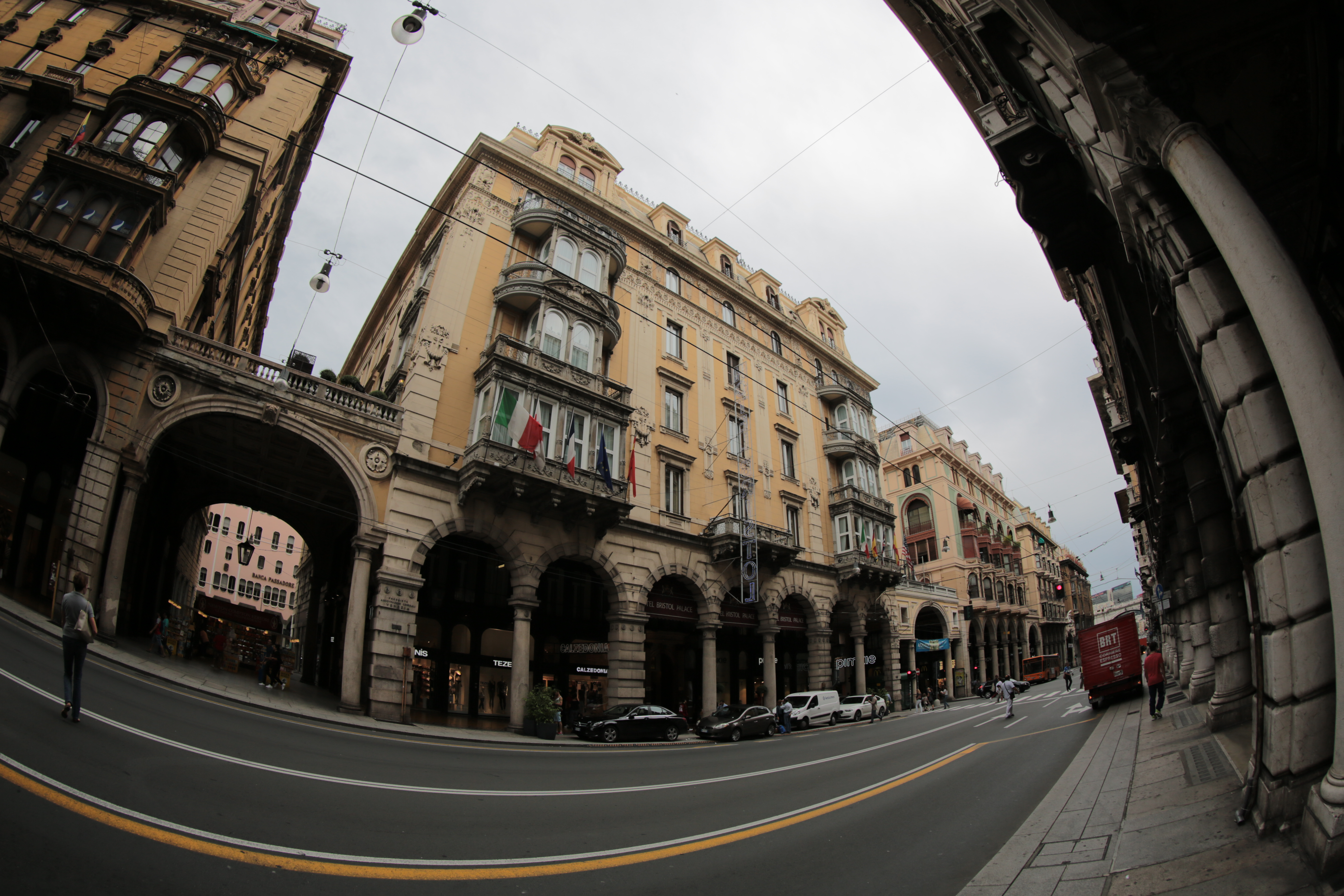
Exterior view
