= Nostra Signora della Consolazione e San Vincenzo martire (Genoa) =

Coordinates: 44°24′20.78″N 8°56′28.78″E

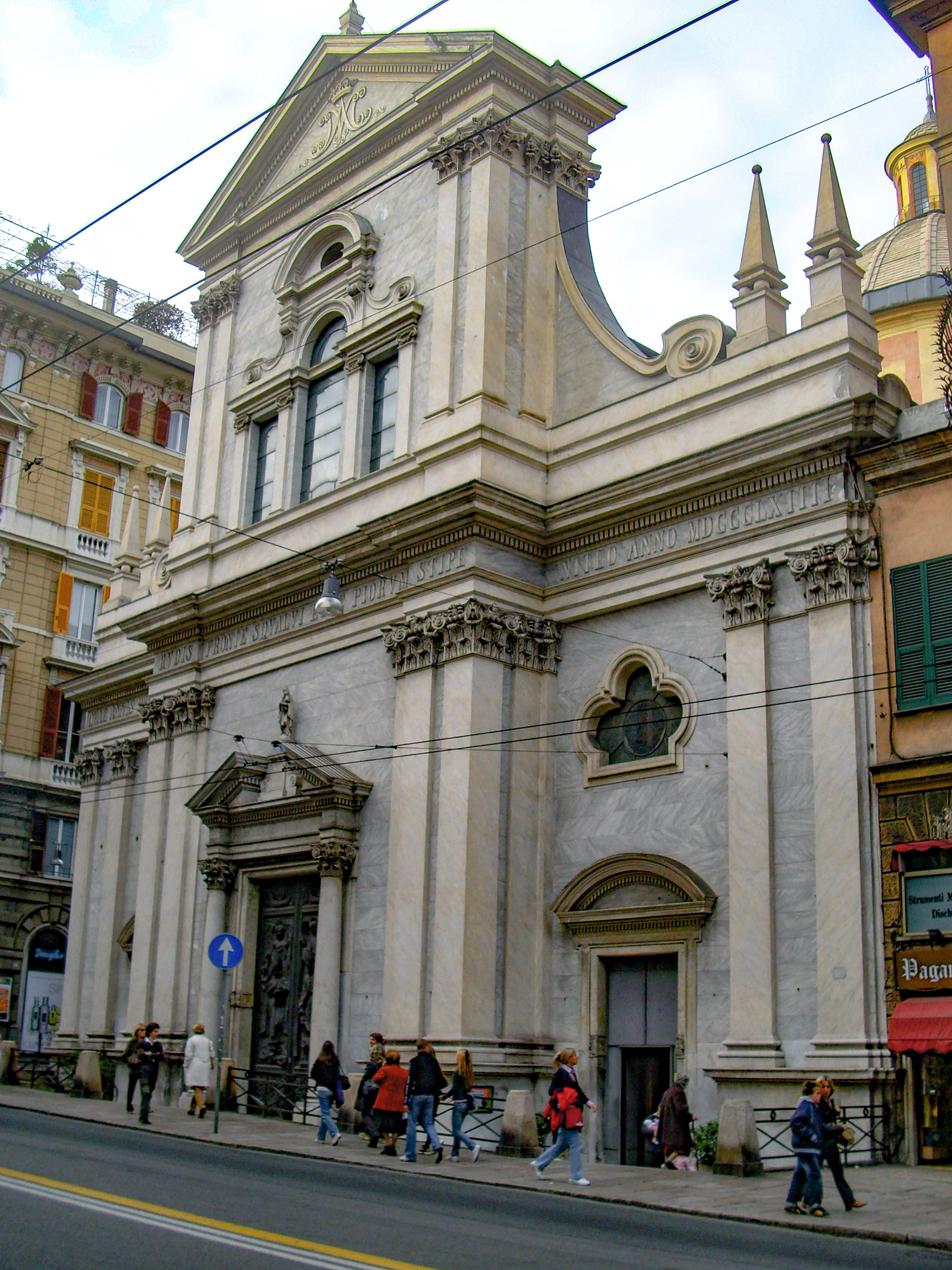

Religion
- Affiliation: Roman Catholic
- Province: Genoa
- Year consecrated: 1875

Location
- Location: Genoa, Italy
- Interactive map of Nostra Signora della Consolazione e San Vincenzo martire

Architecture
- Type: Church
- Style: Neoclassical
- Groundbreaking: 1706
- Completed: 18th century

The church of the Madonna della Consolazione e San Vicenzo Martire (Virgin of the Consolation and St. Vincent Martyr), also called Chiesa di Nostra Signora della Consolazione (once of St Rita) is a church in Genoa, Italy.

A church of ‘’Our Lady of the Consolation’’ under the care of Augustinian Fathers was known near this site since the 15th century. At the time, it stood in the perilous neighborhoods outside the city walls. Construction of new defensive walls after the bombardment in 1684, forced the Augustinian monks to relocate, and they were authorized to build at the present site. Construction ran from 1684 till 1706. The dome was added in 1769 based on designs by Simone Cantoni. The adjacent monastery, never completed, became in the 19th century the site of a marketplace called the Mercato Orientale. In 1810, under Napoleonic rule, the Augustinians were dispossessed of the church, and by 1813, it became a parish church. The interior frescoes date to after 1875. Inside the first altar to the right has a canvas depicting St Thomas of Villanova distributing his wealth to the poor by Domenico Fiasella. The virgin statue on the façade was moved here from the prior church. The organ was built by Giacomo Locatelli in 1880 and restored in 1975.

The church often holds funerals of important people, including that of famed Italian pianist Massimiliano Damerini.
