= Aniello =

Aniello may refer to:

== As a given name ==
- Aniello Ascione (1680–1708), Italian painter of still lifes
- Aniello Califano (1870–1919), Italian poet and writer
- Aniello Campagna (1607–1648), Roman Catholic prelate, Bishop of Nusco
- Lee Aniello Castaldo (1915–1990), American jazz trumpeter and bandleader
- Aniello Cutolo (born 1983), Italian footballer
- Aniello Dellacroce (1914–1985), American mobster and underboss of the Gambino crime family
- Aniello Desiderio (born 1971), Italian virtuoso classical guitarist and teacher
- Aniello Falcone (1600–1656), Italian Baroque painter
- Agnolo Aniello Fiore (15th century), Italian sculptor architect
- Angelo Aniello Fiore (died 1500), Italian architect and sculptor
- Aniello Formisano (born 1954), Italian politician and lawyer
- Aniello Panariello (born 1988), Italian footballer
- Aniello Portio, Italian engraver who worked at Naples from 1690 to 1700
- Aniello Sabbatino (born 2000), Italian rower
- Aniello Salzano (born 1991), Italian footballer

== As a surname ==
- Lucia Aniello (born 1983), Italian-born American director, writer and producer
- Ron Aniello, American songwriter, record producer, composer and musician
- Tommaso Aniello (1620–1647), Italian fisherman, leader of the revolt against Habsburg Spain

== See also ==
- Anielew (disambiguation)
- Anielia
- Anilio (disambiguation)
- Anniela
- Arianiello
- Daniello
- Faniello
- Ianniello
