= San Vincenzo (Genoa) =

District of Genoa, Italy

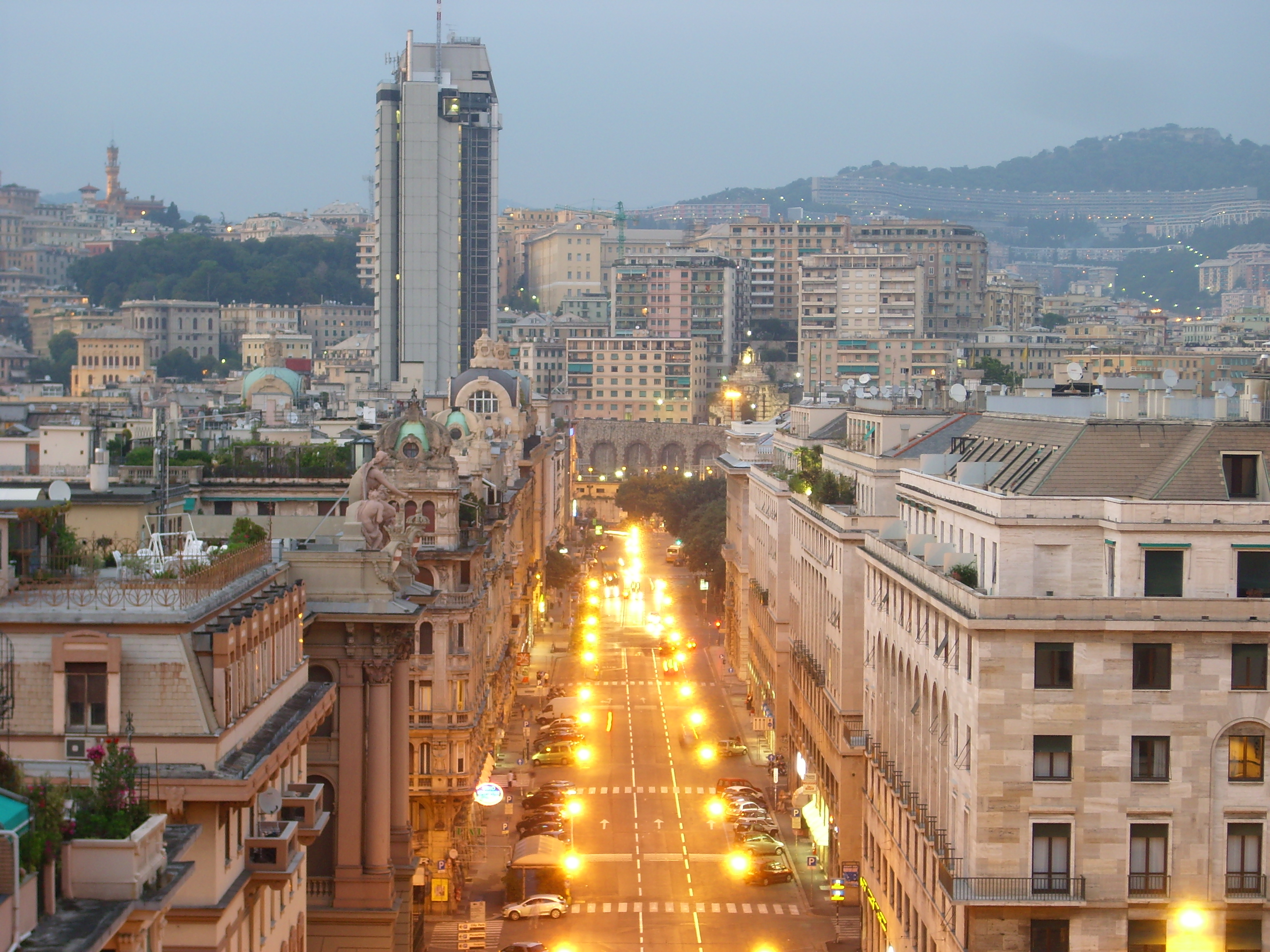
- View of Via Brigata Liguria and Via Fiume, in the background the San Vincenzo Tower, former Genoese headquarters of Telecom Italia

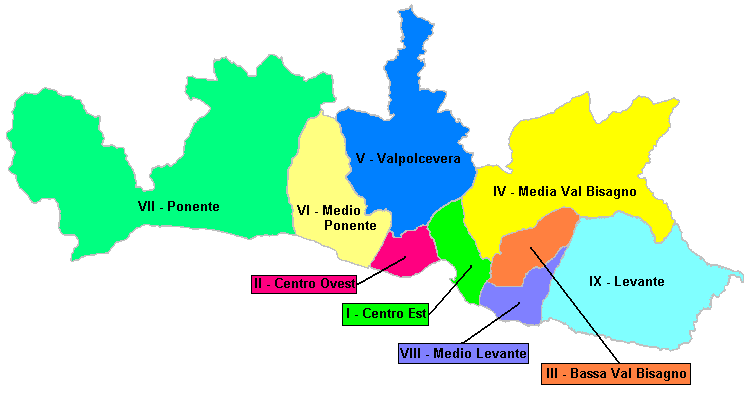
- Map of the districts of Genoa
- Country: Italy
- Region: Liguria
- Province: Genoa
- City: Genoa
- Circoscrizione: Municipio I Centro Est
- Postal code: 16121 - 16122
- Area: 0,685 km²
- Population: 5,323
- Density: 7 770,8 Inh./km²

San Vincenzo (San Viçenso /ˈsaŋ viˈseŋsu/ in Ligurian) is a central district of Genoa, administratively included in the Municipio I Centro Est. Located a short distance from Brignole train station, it includes part of the very central Via XX Settembre, the main artery of Genoa's commercial area.

== Description of the district ==
=== Toponym ===
The neighborhood takes its name from the church of the same name, now deconsecrated, named after St. Vincent of Saragossa. Until the construction of the “New Walls” in the 17th century, it was a suburb outside the city's defensive walls called “Borgo di Bisagno,” because it was located a short distance from the stream of the same name.

=== Territory ===
Historically, the sestiere of San Vincenzo was created after the construction of the seventeenth-century walls and included the entire area to the east between the sixteenth-century city walls and the Mura Nuove. It was thus a vast territory that in addition to the plain on the right bank of the Bisagno River also included the hilly area that today forms the Castelletto district.

With the constitution of the districts, the area of Castelletto was detached and the urban core of the San Vincenzo district merged with that of Portoria, another historic city district, creating the "Portoria" district, subdivided into the "urban units" of "San Vincenzo" and "Carignano," and today included in the Municipio I Centro Est.

The San Vincenzo area proper includes the area on the right bank of the Bisagno River once bounded by the two city walls: to the west the sixteenth-century one, in the section between the Acquasola gate (present-day Piazza Corvetto) and the Cappuccine walls, which still delimits the neighborhood towards Portoria and Carignano; to the east the "New Walls," facing the Bisagno with the large embankment of the "Fronti Basse," in which the Pila and Romana gates opened, on the roads heading east. Today, with the disappearance of the “Fronti Basse,” demolished in the late 19th century, the axis of Via Fiume and Via Brigata Liguria demarcates the area of San Vincenzo from that of the Foce.

To the north, the boundary with the Castelletto neighborhood consists of a short stretch of Via Assarotti and the axis of Via Peschiera and Via F. Romani, up to the Zerbino walls, which delimit the neighborhood to the east from that of San Fruttuoso.

== Demography ==
The “urban unit” of San Vincenzo, which as mentioned also includes the former sestiere of Portoria, has a population of 5,323 (as of December 31, 2010).

Available historical data concern the former Portoria district as a whole, with the two urban units of San Vincenzo and Carignano. The demographic history of the former district is affected by the urbanistic vicissitudes of the area. The population, 35,877 at the first census in 1861, rose to 40,260 in 1901, a figure representing the “historical maximum.” Since then, with the transformation of these former working-class neighborhoods into an area designated for business centers and tertiary activities, a conspicuous population decline began. The population, still 35,007 in 1936, declined to 20,021 in 1961, down to the current 12,331, of which 5,323, as already mentioned, are in the San Vincenzo urban unit alone.

== History ==
=== Origins ===
The “borgo di Bisagno” originally consisted of the houses lined up along the medieval street that exited the city heading east, first through the Porta Soprana and then, with the construction of the fourteenth-century walls, through the Porta degli Archi. This road, frequented from ancient times, as evidenced by several archaeological findings, crossed the Bisagno River at the bridge of S. Agata, near the “borgo degli Incrociati,” which at one time, before the construction of the New Walls, was the natural continuation of the “borgo di Bisagno.”

”... by the present Via s. Vincenzo one went to the hospice and hospital, which the ancient Crutched Friars maintained near the bridge of s. Agata: here one crossed the river, entered the Strada Romana in the villa of Terralba (s. Fruttuoso), and ascended to s. Martino d'Albaro, following by the Riviera di Levante."

— Goffredo Casalis, "Geographical, historical, statistical and commercial dictionary of the states of HM the King of Sardinia", 1840

In the 11th century the area of the district was an agricultural zone of ecclesiastical property, and a chapel dedicated to St. Vincent the Martyr was built there in 1059, which was transformed into an oratory a century later. In its place in the 17th century a church was built, which was suppressed in 1813 and today houses the Officers' Club.

This is how Giustiniani, a bishop and historian, described the area in his “Annals” in the early sixteenth century:

“At the gate of the arches is continued the suburb of Bisagno, distinguished into upper and lower: the lower contains fifty-seven houses, which are all of the parish of S. Stefano, and for the most part of gardeners: and there is in this suburb the monastery of S. Maria della Pace, inhabited by the Observant friars of S. Francis; there is also the meadow named della Lana. And in the borough above there are two hundred and four houses, of which there are sixty belonging to citizens, the remainder are of artisans. And in the beginning of the suburb, where the street divides, is a small oratory named ad Sanctos peregrinos, which was the first lodging of SS. Nazario and Celso, when very soon after the passion of the Savior they came to preach the faith of Christ to the city of Genoa. And then there is the parish church of St. Vincent, and, proceeding farther on, the monastery of Santo Spirito, which are Conventual nuns; and after that the monastery of the Cruciferous. And, however, proceeding northward, almost at the end of the suburb in an eminent place, is a large and very famous monastery of the monks of the observance of St. Augustine, entitled to St. Mary of Consolation. And all the inhabitants of this hamlet, so departed, in many civil things are reputed and treated as their own citizens.”

— Agostino Giustiniani, "Annals of the Republic of Genoa", 1537

=== The Mura Nuove and the sestiere of S. Vincenzo ===
Between 1626 and 1632, with the construction of the “Mura Nuove” (New Walls), part of the area was incorporated within the defensive walls; The “borgo di Bisagno,” renamed after the parish church, along with S. Teodoro (another city area incorporated within the circle of the walls), were counted among the city's sestieri, joining the four historic sestieri. The construction of the Mura Nuove came to break the continuity of the borough: while the area around the church of S. Vincenzo was included within the new circle of walls along with part of the Bisagno plain and became the heart of the new sestiere, Borgo Incrociati remained outside it.

“The passage of so many people made this street popular, which was called the Borgo, as it really was before the last circle in 1633. At that time, many houses were flattened to make room for the walls, the moats, the external defensive works and the rampart. In this way, the very long and populated suburb was divided into three parts: the one enclosed by the new walls, called Strada S. Vincenzo; the one that was flattened and stretched from the Porta Romana to the Church of the Crutched Friars; the one that stretched from this church along the banks of the Bisagno, near the bridge of Sant'Agata, preserving the ancient and absolute name of Borgo.”

— Goffredo Casalis, "Geographical, historical, statistical and commercial dictionary of the states of HM the King of Sardinia", 1840

=== The Nineteenth Century ===
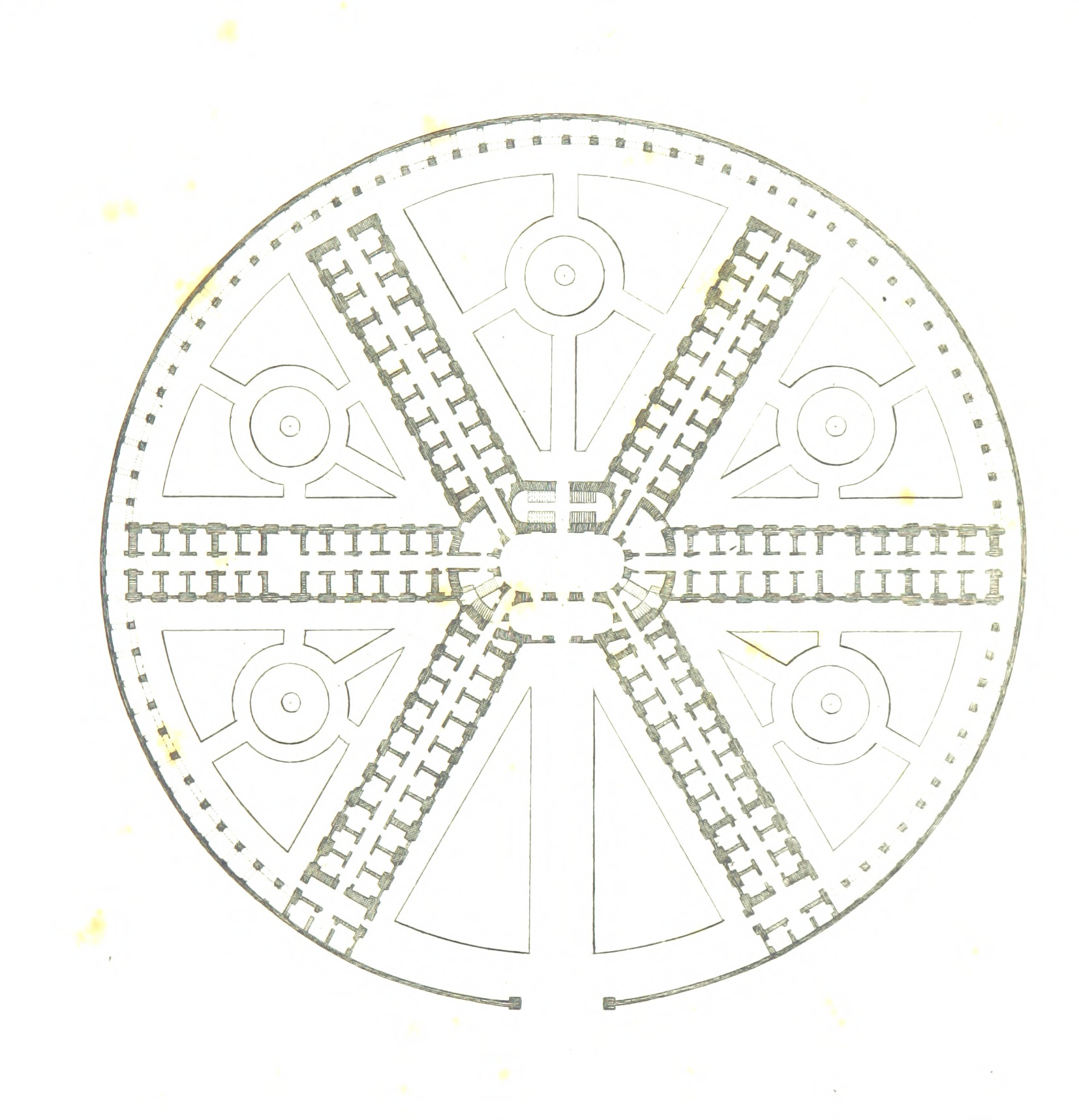
Genoa, former Asylum in the Sestiere of S. Vincenzo

Although incorporated within the city walls, the district until the 19th century did not undergo significant changes. The main residential settlement remained the one along the main street, while the rest of the plain had a mainly agricultural use, with a few modest dwellings extending as far as the Carignano hill. The only building of any significance in the area known as “Abrara” (today's Cesarea Street and neighboring streets) was the ancient church of “S. Martino de via,” later S. Maria della Pace, which would later be demolished to make room for the urban expansion at the end of the century.

The urban plan prepared by architect Carlo Barabino in 1825, aimed at extending the city towards the east by overcoming the limits of the medieval city found, albeit amid various difficulties, a first partial application only between the 1930s and 1940s, under the direction of G.B. Resasco, who after Barabino's death in 1835 had succeeded him in the role of civic architect. In the mid-1940s, Via Colombo, parallel to the old S. Vincenzo street, and Via Galata, perpendicular to it, were built; at the intersection of the new streets, Piazza Colombo was constructed. The square, square in shape, was built following Barabino's design in principle, with four identical porticoed buildings constructed by entrepreneur Pietro Gambaro. With the new houses, the old village of artisans and peasants was gradually transformed into an elegant residential neighborhood.

In 1834 work was begun on the construction, in the area of today's Via Cesarea, of the asylum, the first city facility specifically intended for the hospitalization of the mentally ill, next to which a number of beehive-shaped houses for the working classes were built by entrepreneur Francesco Ponte.

The asylum, designed by Barabino, was completed under the direction of Celestino Foppiani in 1841. The structure consisted of a central circular building on five floors that housed the administration offices and common services. From this branched six building wings destined for the cells of the hospitalized patients. Gardens were created in the spaces between the various wings, and the whole complex was bounded outward by a circular portico. The structure, which occupied a total area of about two hectares, was inaugurated on August 14, 1841. However, the large building was short-lived: towards the end of the century, with the opening of Via XX Settembre, the area was given a residential use; thus, the new psychiatric hospital in Quarto was built, to which the patients were transferred in 1894. The building was demolished in 1914.

A real turning point in the urban development of the neighborhood occurred towards the end of the 19th century, with the construction of Via XX Settembre. With the opening of this artery, the city center was shifted sharply to the east.

The street, built by rectifying and widening the existing Via Giulia (in the Portoria district), Via della Consolazione and Via Porta Pila, was characterized from the beginning by Art Nouveau architecture; among the architects who participated in the various designs was the Florentine Gino Coppedè.

=== The twentieth century ===
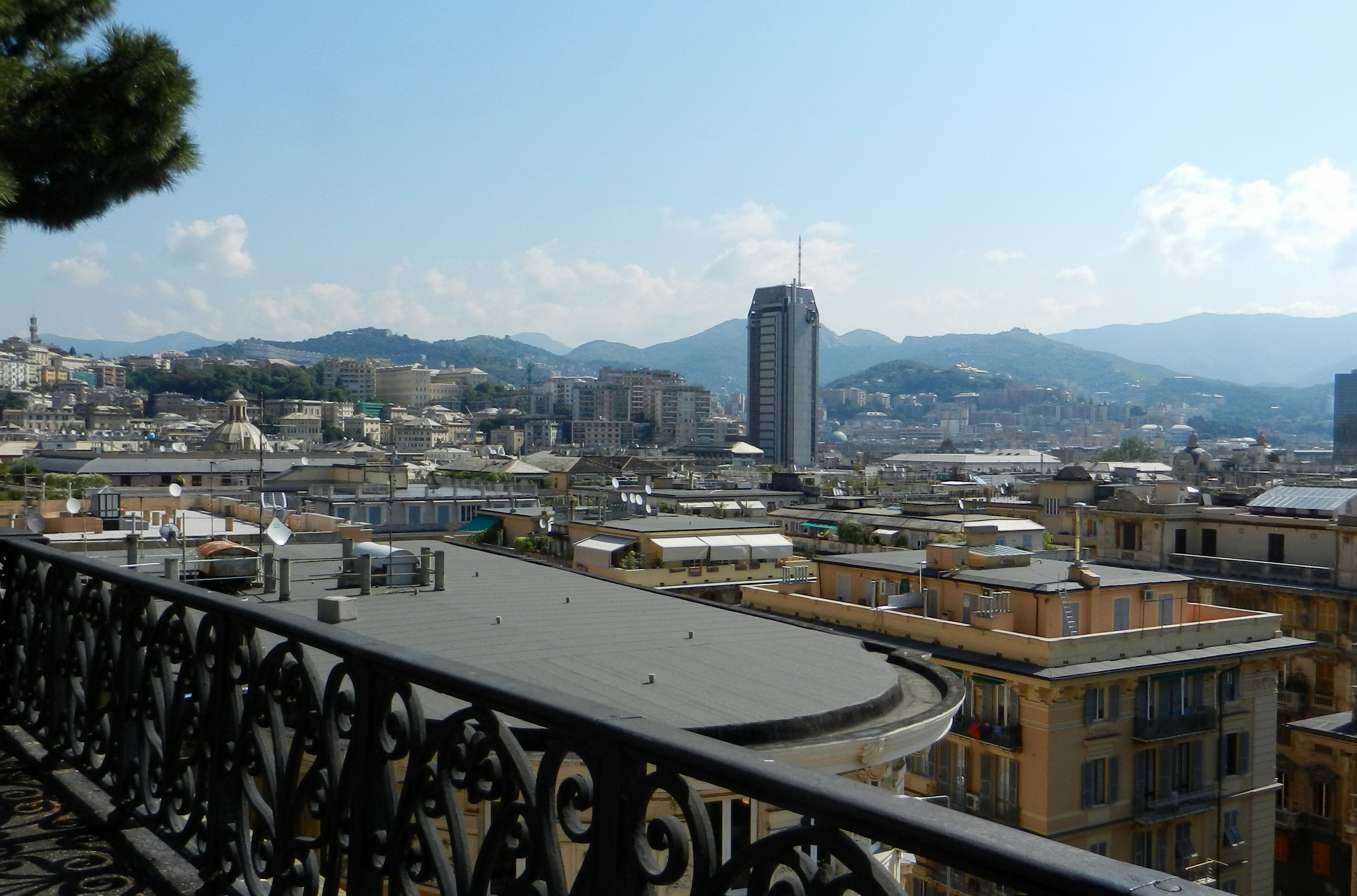
View from the walls of St. Clare (Corso A. Podestà)

Between the end of the nineteenth century and the first two decades of the twentieth century, the urbanization of the Abrara area was completed, which was totally changed after the construction of Via XX Settembre, with the demolition of the asylum, the long-deconsecrated Church of Peace, and the few modest dwellings that stood in an area still partly cultivated with vegetable gardens. In place of these buildings and the remaining agricultural areas, a new elegant residential and commercial district was thus created in the quadrangle between Via XX Settembre, Via del Prato (today Via Brigata Liguria) and the Walls of St. Clare.

The urban layout thus outlined at the turn of the century has not undergone significant changes since the 1920s. Buildings constructed during the twentieth century include the “Museum of Natural History” (1912), the “Theater of Youth” (1930), the “Palace of Financial Offices,” built in the 1930s on the site of the nineteenth-century slaughterhouse, and the Telecom skyscraper on the corner of Via S. Vincenzo and Via Fiume, built in the 1960s to a design by Piero Gambacciani.

== Monuments and places of interest ==
=== Streets and squares ===
Historically, the suburb of San Vincenzo was located on the direct route from Genoa to the east, which, exiting the city through the gates opened in the successive extensions of the city walls, crossed the Bisagno River at the Sant'Agata Bridge. Over time, a new access from the east at Borgo Pila, which had sprung up across the stream on the Bisagno plain, had increased in importance.

The road axes delineated by these routes currently correspond to Via S. Vincenzo and Via XX Settembre, at the end of which, in the seventeenth-century walls, Porta Romana and Porta Pila opened, respectively. In the area between these two streets, the first urban expansion of the neighborhood (Via Colombo, Piazza Colombo and Via Galata) developed around 1840.

==== Via XX Settembre ====
It was built in the last decade of the nineteenth century, rectifying and widening the route of Via Giulia and Via della Consolazione, in order to create a new road system towards the east, which until then had inadequate outlets. The naming of the new street was the subject of heated debate at the time, until the desire of many citizens prevailed to have the historic date of the Capture of Rome recognized with this naming. The section of the street affecting the S. Vincenzo district (from Ponte Monumentale to Via Fiume), while lacking the sumptuous appearance of the part between Piazza De Ferrari and Ponte Monumentale, characterized by high porticoes with Venetian-style pavements, is equally dense with elegant and prestigious stores, making the street one of the city's most popular destinations for shopping and strolling. At the time of its opening, the street, wide, rectilinear and flanked by palaces of unusual height for the times, represented a real novelty for the Genoese, who were accustomed to moving between narrow alleys. The competition for the construction of the new street was announced in 1883, after an almost 20-year debate, and it was not until 1887 that Cesare Gamba's design was approved. Work began in 1892. The lower part was built first, with the rearrangement of the former Consolation Street completed the following year; the street was inaugurated on January 18, 1896. The construction of the buildings facing the street would not be completed until 1913. All pre-existing buildings, except the Consolation church and the adjoining convent, were demolished and replaced by new buildings, built for the first time in Genoa in reinforced concrete.

==== Via San Vincenzo ====
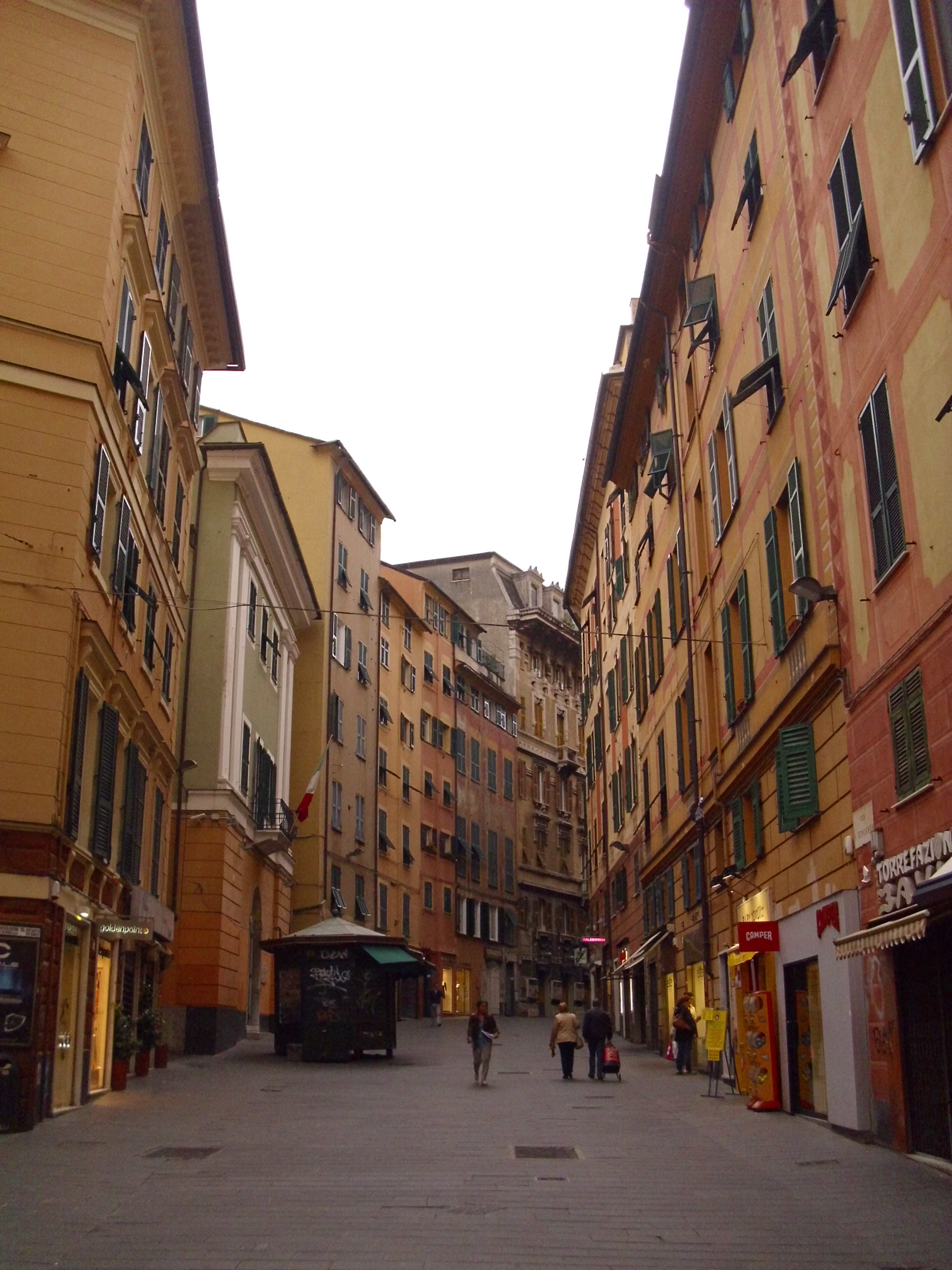
Via San Vincenzo

The street that runs through the historic center of the district begins at the Monumental Bridge and reaches near Brignole station. The street, which is very old, formed part of the eastward link out of Genoa, heading toward the hill of San Martino d'Albaro, after crossing the Bisagno River at the Sant'Agata Bridge. The street's buildings, although marked by mid-nineteenth-century urban development, leave glimpses of the ancient suburban settlement, such as some late medieval buildings with portals, the former churches of San Vincenzo and Santo Spirito, and some Renaissance palaces, such as the Grimaldi-Sauli and Centurione palaces, where Virginia Centurione Bracelli was born.

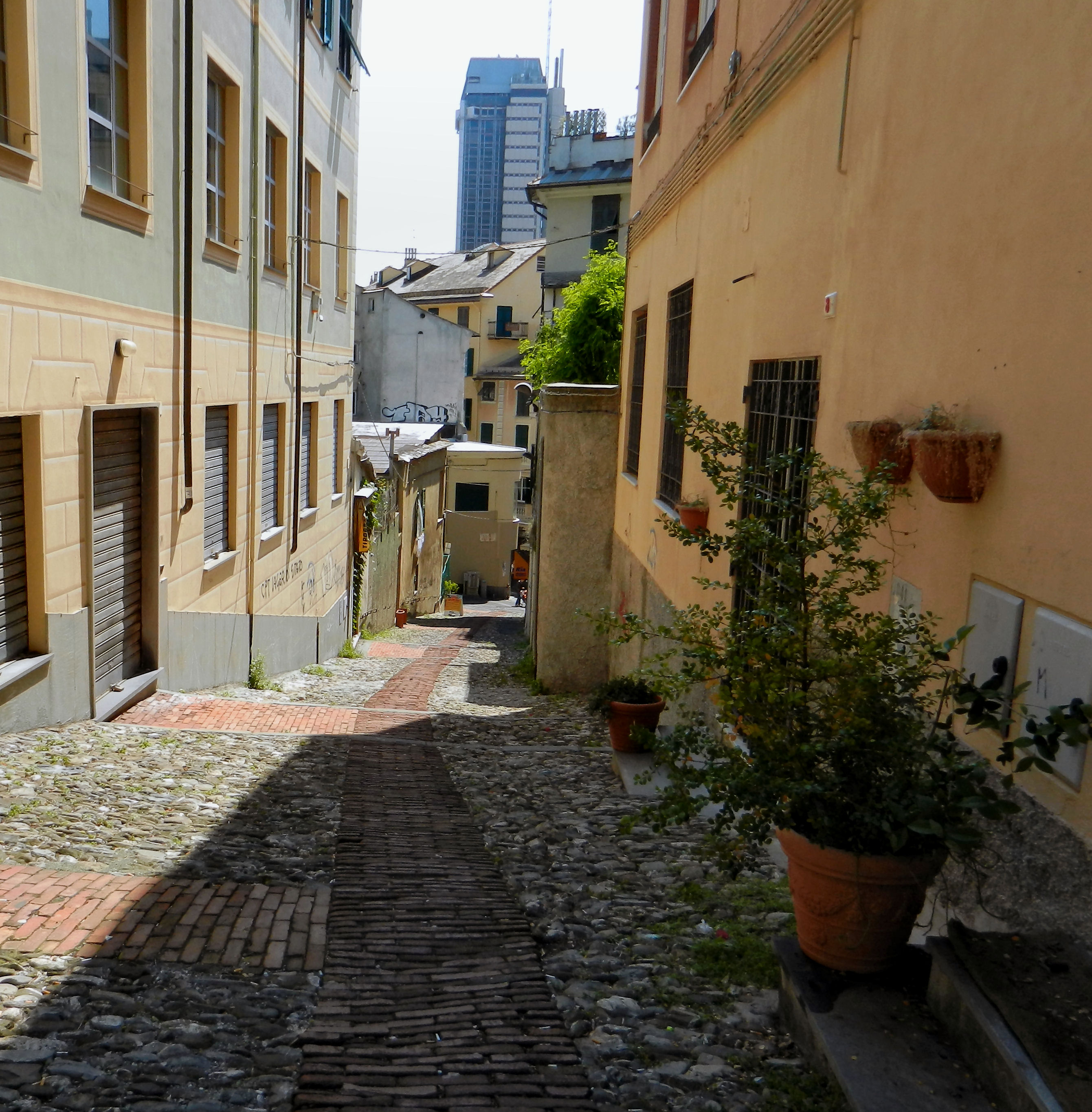
Salita della Tosse

The last stretch of the street until the end of the 19th century was called “via di Porta Romana,” because it led to the 17th-century gate, which was demolished in 1891. Today Via San Vincenzo is almost completely pedestrianized.

From Via San Vincenzo begins the Salita della Tosse, which reaches the bastion of Acquasola from where through the gate of Santa Caterina one entered the city near the church of Santo Stefano. Along this slope, which took its name from an ancient oratory named after N.S. della Tosse, the Teatro della Tosse company (moved first to Via Canevari, and finally since 1986 to its home in Stradone Sant'Agostino, in the Sarzano area), founded in 1975 by Tonino Conte, Emanuele Luzzati, Aldo Trionfo and others, had its first home.

==== Piazza Colombo ====
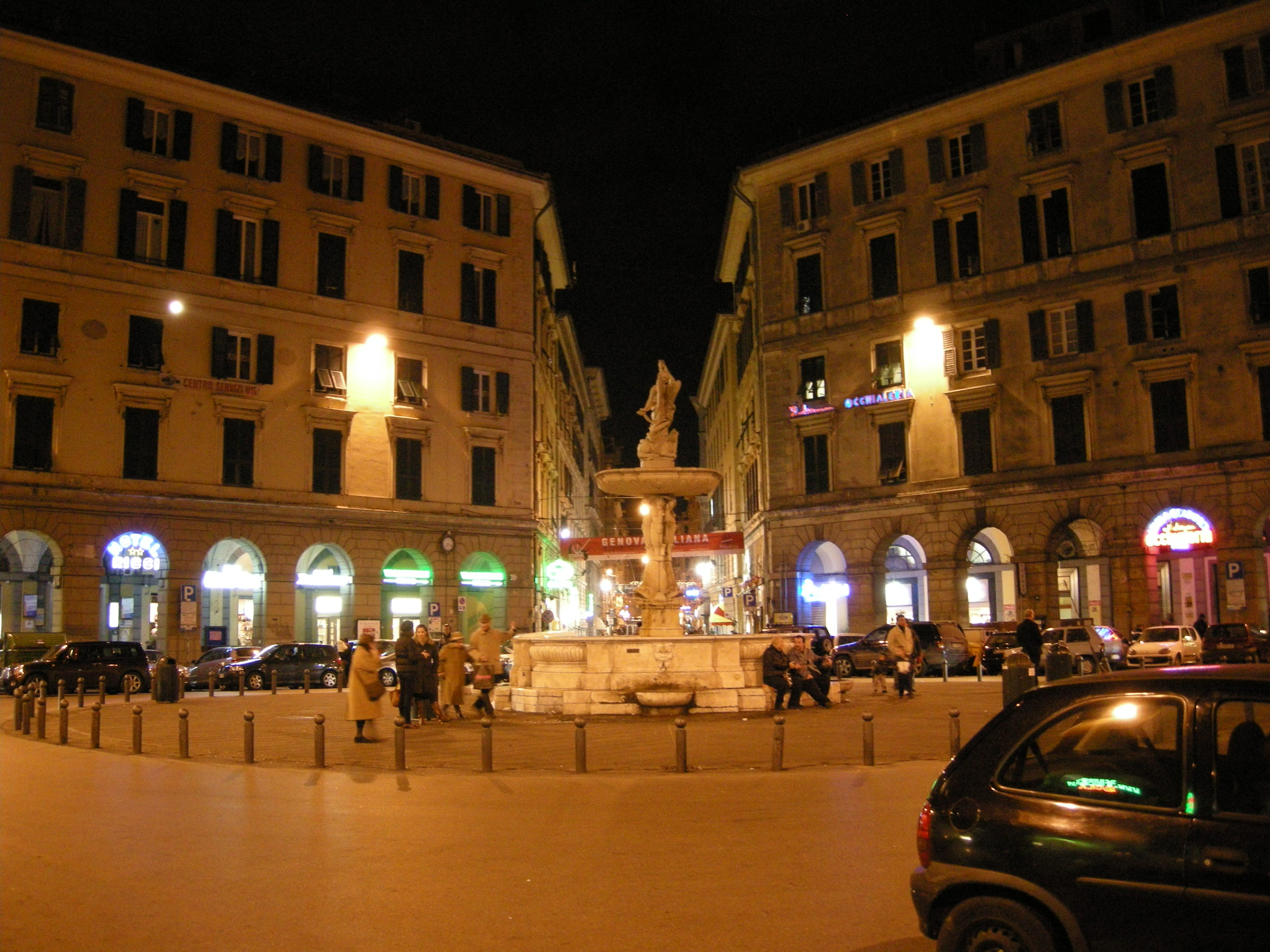
Piazza Colombo, night view

It was designed around 1830 by Barabino and built around 1840 by Resasco, on land previously used as vegetable gardens. The square, located at the intersection of Via Colombo and Via Galata, has a square shape and is surrounded by four arcaded buildings, now enlivened by book stalls and old-fashioned stores.

Barabino's initial plan called for the construction of council houses intended for evictees from other parts of the city where urban renewal plans had been initiated, but as the new neighborhood had meanwhile become attractive for high-end housing, Resasco built stately homes there.

In the center of the square in 1861 the seventeenth-century fountain of the "Genio Marino," formerly at Ponte Reale, was placed.

==== Via Galata ====
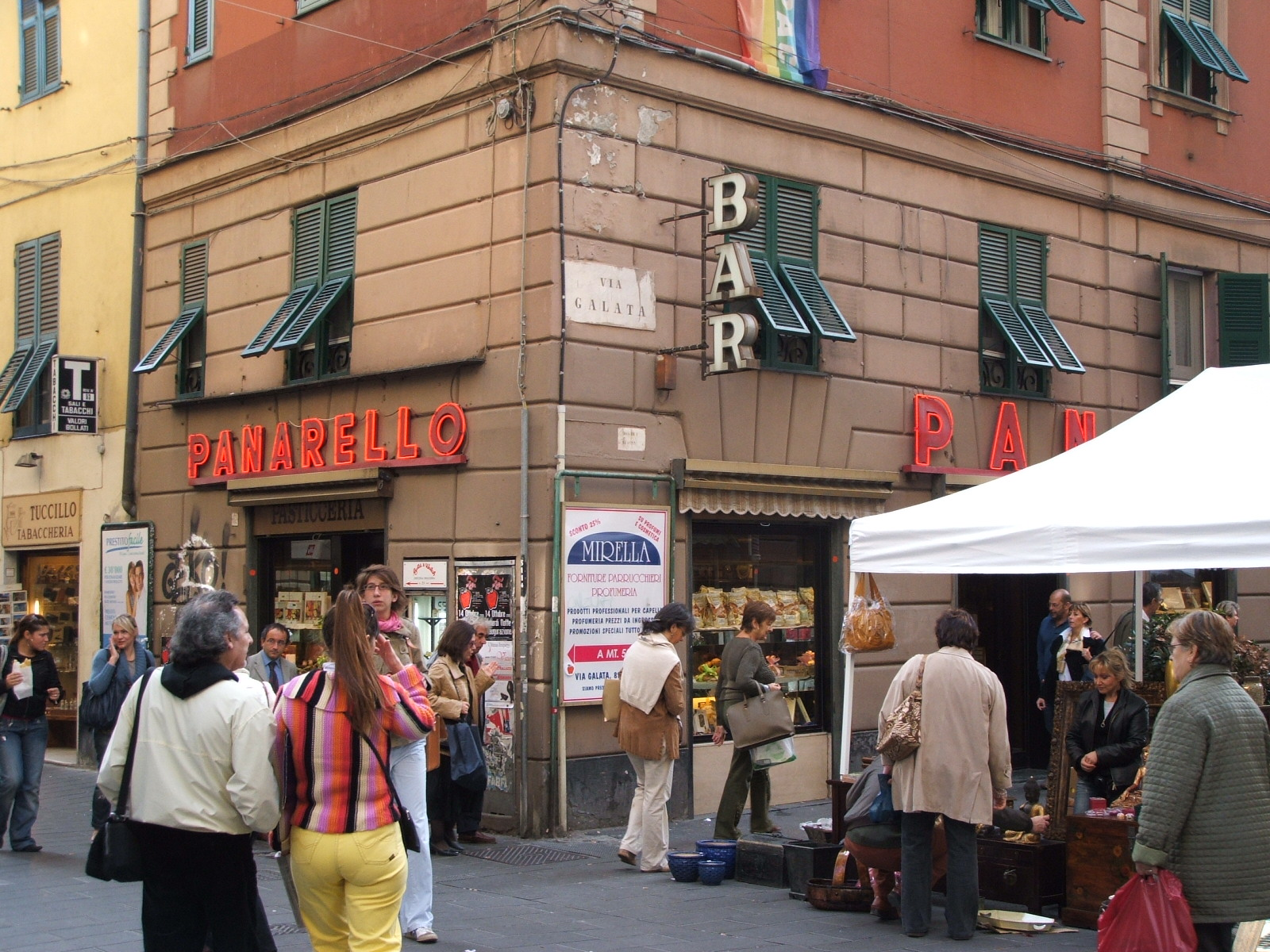
The old Panarello pastry shop, at the corner of Via Galata and Via S. Vincenzo.

Originally this street, known as Crosa Larga, ran from the Brignoline convent to the Carignano hill and also included part of the street currently corresponding to Via Cesarea. Rectilinear, it cut perpendicularly through Via S. Vincenzo and Via Colombo and ends today in Via XX Settembre.

From the mid-nineteenth century, before it was named after the Genoese colony, it was briefly referred to as “Via al Manicomio,” because it ended in front of the then-psychiatric hospital complex. In a modest room on the street in 1964 the “Louisiana Jazz Club” was founded, now relocated to Via S. Sebastiano, near Via Roma. Established as a gathering point for jazz musicians, it has hosted some of the most important international jazz ensembles.

==== Via Fiume and Via Brigata Liguria ====
These two streets, once called “Via Edera” and “Via del Prato” respectively, bordered the neighborhood to the east, running along the Fronti Basse. Today, Via Fiume faces Piazza Verdi, and Via Brigata Liguria runs parallel to the west building of Piazza della Vittoria. On Via Fiume stand the former Telecom skyscraper and the Financial Office Building, and on Via Brigata Liguria is the Museum of Natural History. Until the mid-19th century these streets were modest alleys, between the city walls on one side and vegetable gardens on the other. With the urbanization of the area they were widened and lined with houses.

==== Via Serra ====
A connecting road between Piazza Corvetto and Brignole station (now one-way only in this direction), it was opened by the Serra family at their own expense in 1838 to connect the buildings they owned. It was once called “via degli Orfani” because the “Orphanage S. Giovanni Battista” had stood in the area since 1538. The street, expanded and improved in 1845, is home to the National Institute for the Deaf-Mutes and several stately mansions.

=== Civil architecture ===
==== Villa Grimaldi-Sauli ====
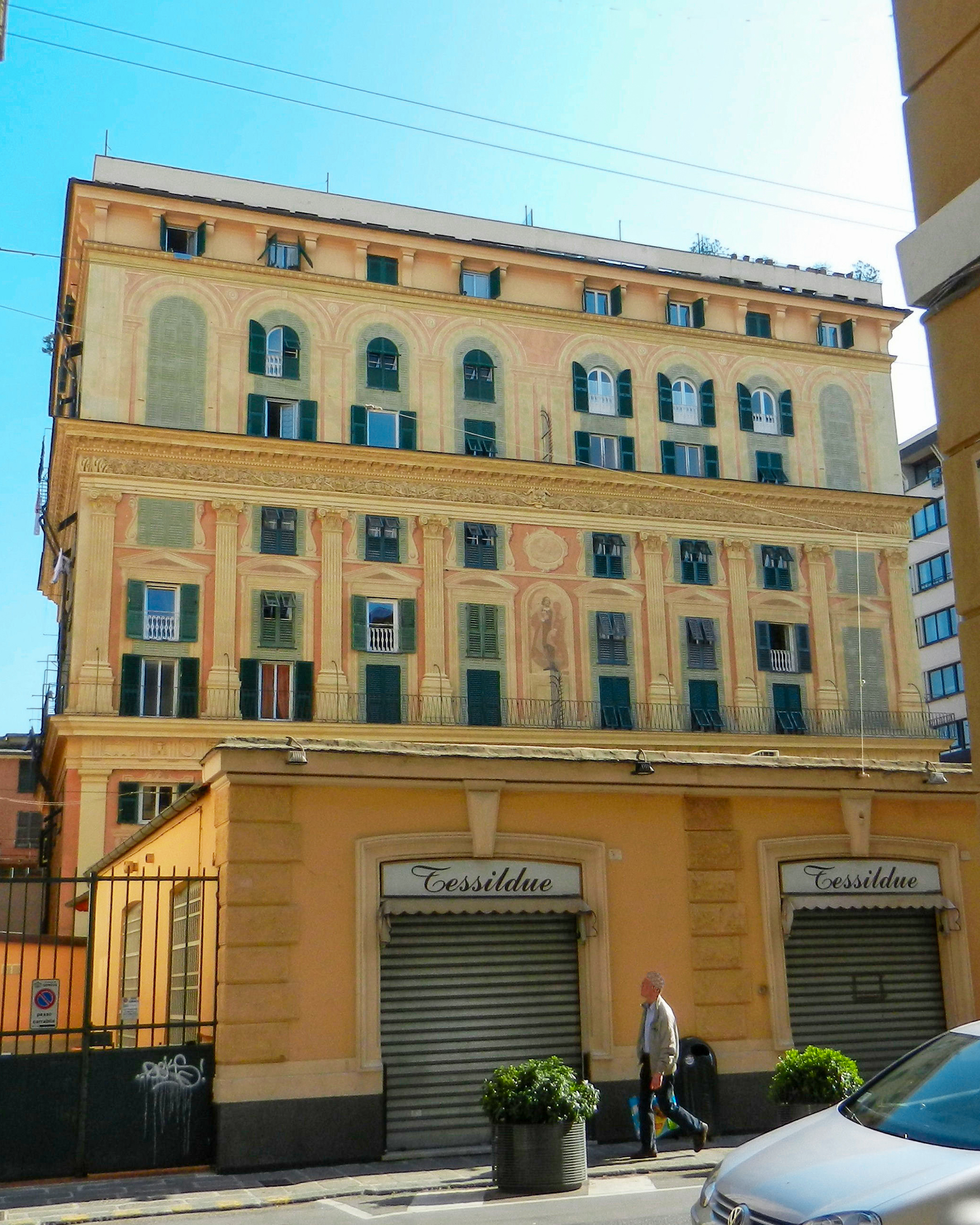
The Grimaldi-Sauli mansion in its modern version.

It is located between San Vincenzo Street and Colombo Street, next to the San Vincenzo Tower. Built between 1552 and 1554 to a design by Galeazzo Alessi for the Grimaldi family, because of the grandeur of its proportions and the richness of its ornaments, including frescoes by Luca Cambiaso and Orazio Semino, at the time of its construction it was considered by Gauthier to be one of the best suburban villas in Genoa, also mentioned by Vasari for its unusually ornate baths.

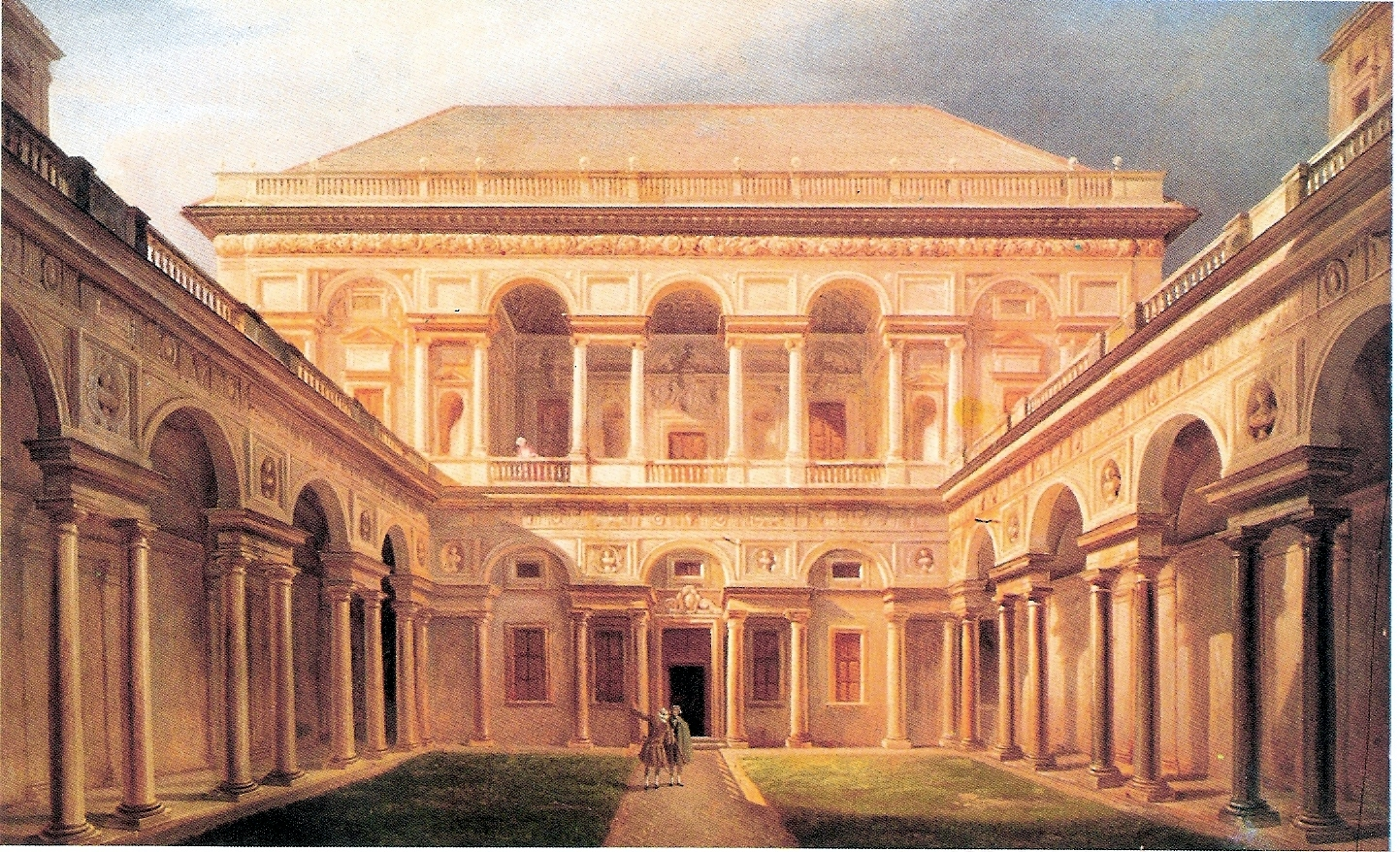
The Grimaldi-Sauli palace in a 19th-century painting by Domenico Cambiaso

Passed from the Grimaldi to the Cybo and finally to the Sauli, from the eighteenth century it experienced a gradual period of decline: some rooms were first used for other purposes (silk production, warehouse), then the necessary maintenance of the structures was not promptly done, and in the nineteenth century it was divided into private apartments for needy families. The large garden behind disappeared to make way for the urbanization of the area. In 1897 a project to build eight apartment blocks threatened to erase forever what remained of the historic villa, which was instead purchased by the City of Genoa. Between 2007 and 2009 it was fully restored, bringing back the villa's fine 19th-century style, which, although far from the sumptuous monumentality of the original structure, is included in the ministerial list of Cultural Heritage and in the Municipal Urban Plan among the elements of individual emergency.

==== Telecom skyscraper ====
The San Vincenzo Tower, known as the “Telecom Tower” or also “SIP Building,” is a skyscraper in Genoa that housed the offices of Telecom Italia until the 1990s. Built between 1966 and 1968 to a design by architect Piero Gambacciani, it stands on Via S. Vincenzo at the corner of Via Fiume, across from Genova Brignole Station. Since 2005, it has housed the Genoa headquarters of Confindustria, as well as various associations and companies. With its 21 stories it reaches a height of 105 m and is the third tallest building in Genoa, after the Matitone in San Benigno and the Piacentini Tower in Piazza Dante.

==== Monumental Bridge ====
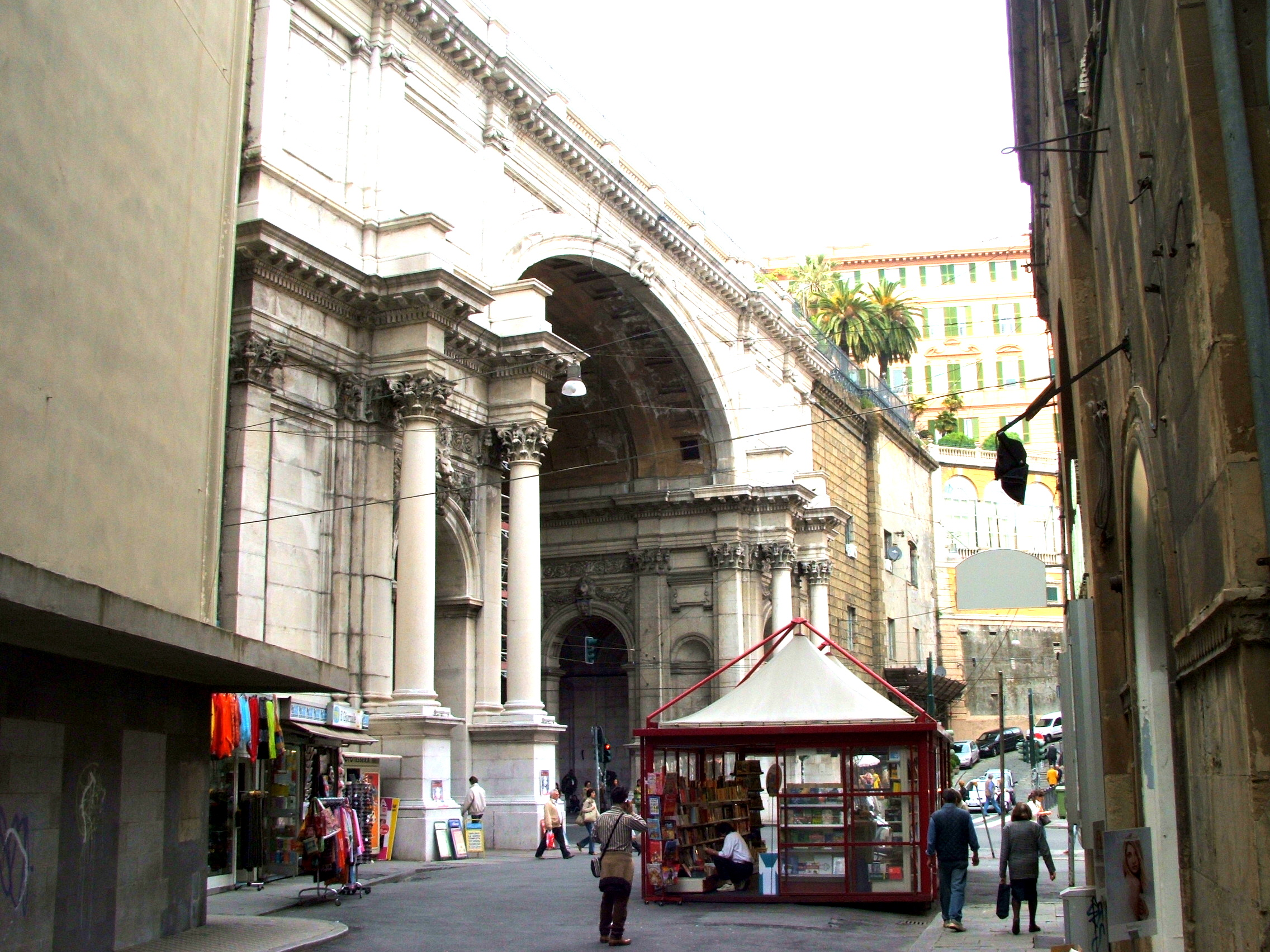
The Monumental Bridge

Monumental Bridge, which connects the Acquasola and S. Chiara Walls, was built to plans by Cesare Gamba and Riccardo Haupt between 1893 and 1895, replacing the Porta degli Archi, which was dismantled and rebuilt on the Mura del Prato. Over the bridge, which bypasses Via XX Settembre, passes Corso Andrea Podestà, which runs on the ramparts of the 16th-century walls and connects Piazza Corvetto with the Carignano area. Having become one of the landmarks of the modern city, it divides the Portoria area from the S. Vincenzo area and offers an excellent view of Via XX Settembre below. The bridge, 21 meters high above the street level of Via XX Settembre, is built of stone and brick, according to the type of railway arches in use at that time, but was later covered externally with white Mazzano stone.

In 1949, the two side arches, decorated with statues by Nino Servettaz, were dedicated to the fallen for freedom: some epigraphs recall the names of the fallen of the Resistance, the act of surrender of the German troops of General Meinhold to the Ligurian CLN (April 25, 1945) and the text of the motivation with which Genoa was awarded the gold medal for Resistance in 1947.

==== Buildings on Via XX Settembre ====
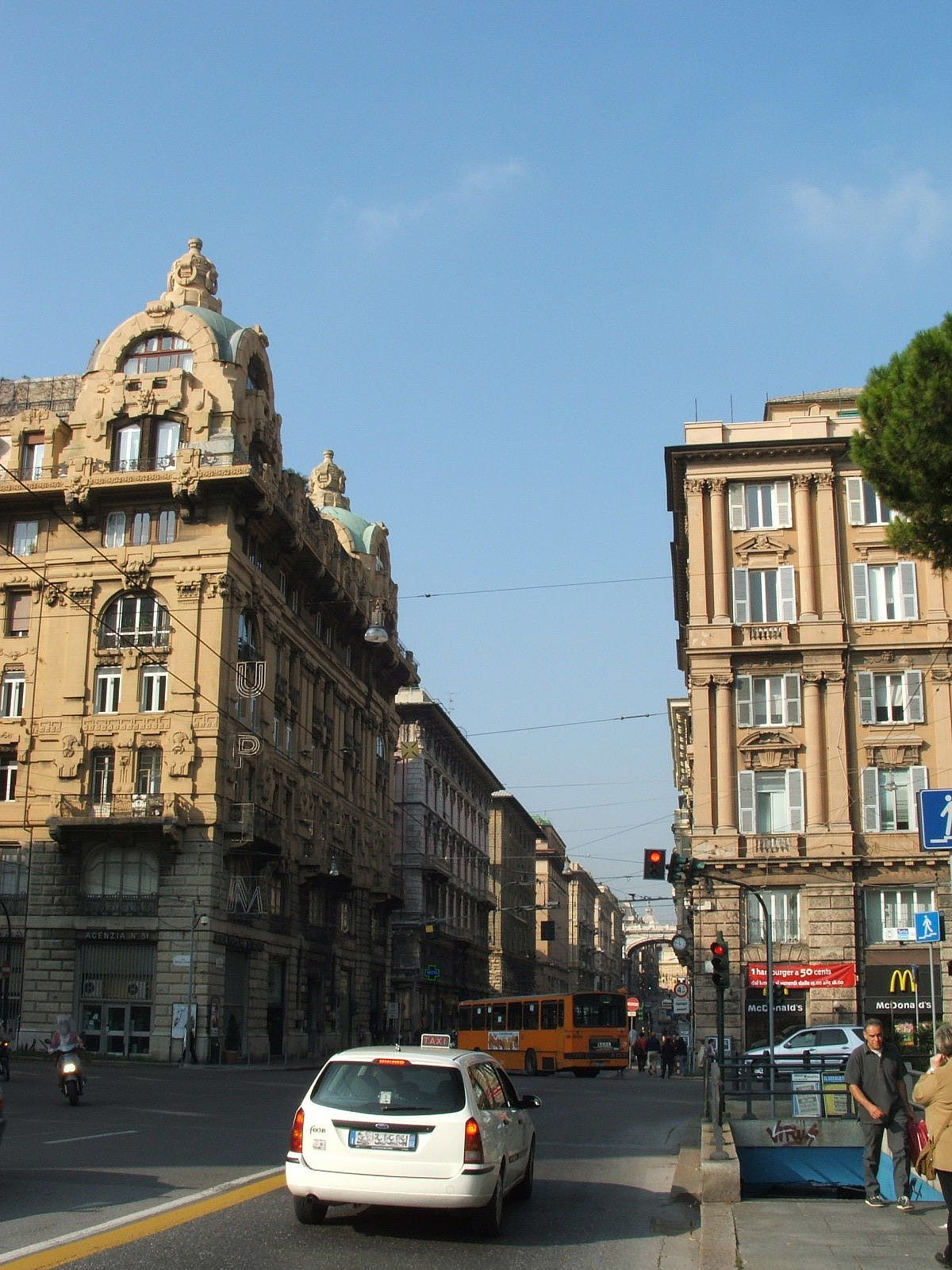
Via XX Settembre from Via Cadorna; in the foreground the “Palace of the Domes”

The long artery opened in the last part of the 19th century is divided in two by the Monumental Bridge: the buildings on the upper side are equipped with porticoes and architecturally more elegant, while on the eastern side reinforced concrete structures prevail, innovative for the time, enriched by the typical Art Nouveau decorations that characterize most of the new central areas of the city, or by traditional elements inspired by Mannerist architecture or Florentine Gothic. The most interesting buildings are those on the south side of the street.

- Palazzo delle Cupole, no. 2. Located on the corner of Brigata Liguria Street, south side, it was built between 1905 and 1909 to a design by Dario Carbone. Built entirely of reinforced concrete, even in the vertical structures, it has a facade decorated with motifs typical of the Art Nouveau style. It is characterized by four corner towers, topped by domes.
- Palazzo Bianco, no. 4. Designed by Cesare Gamba, it is inspired by an undefined style that can be dated between the 16th and 17th centuries.
- Palazzo Boggio-Rosazza, no. 6. Also designed by Cesare Gamba. Inspired by the Florentine Palazzo Medici Riccardi, it has an ashlar-finished base.
- Palazzo Zuccarino, no. 10-12. Designed in 1901 by Federico Cuneo, it was built on the area where the church of S. Maria della Pace stood. It has the shape of an inverted "E," with two open inner courtyards at the back. Again, the style appears to be a fusion of Romanesque-Gothic and sixteenth-century Mannerism.
- Palazzo Zuccarino on Via Maragliano, no. 2. Adjacent to the previous one, it is the work of Gino Coppedè. Extremely lavish with the most classical decorative elements typical of the celebrated Florentine architect, it is considered among the best Art Nouveau buildings in the area.
- Palazzo dei Giganti, no. 14. In Art Nouveau style, built in 1906, it is located opposite the Consolation Church. The facade, tripartite at the base by four ashlar pillars, is adorned by four pairs of concrete atlantes, the work of Michele Sansebastiano, supporting four groups of paired columns. Before its relocation to the Darsena area, the palace housed the Genoese headquarters of Bureau Veritas, one of the oldest ship classification agencies, present in Genoa since 1848.
- Palace at no. 16-18. Adjacent to the Monumental Bridge, it was designed by Adolfo Bisso in 1898. It has an irregular shape to follow the course of the widening in front of the Monumental Bridge. Through the building is access to the old Margherita Theater, now occupied by commercial activities. The theater's entryway divides the building into two distinct wings, which also differ in their facade decorations: the east side has decorations inspired by sixteenth-century Mannerism, the west side is in the “neo-Romantic” style, with a crowning of Lombard bands.
- Maineri Palace, no. 23. The most significant building on the north side of the street also stands near the Monumental Bridge, on the corner of S. Vincenzo. It was built between 1909 and 1913 to a design by Gino Coppedè. Because of its location, the building has an irregular plan; the facade, although rich in decorative elements in Art Nouveau style, vaguely inspired by Egyptian and Chinese-Japanese motifs, is more sober than the other buildings designed by the Florentine architect.

==== Villa Serra ====
Another building that remains as evidence of the times when the area was the holiday residence of Genoese patricians is Villa Serra, near the street of the same name, which can be seen today in its nineteenth-century makeover (1836-1850), commissioned by Marquis Giovanni Carlo Serra. Between the late 19th century and the 1920s, the villa housed the luxurious “Hotel Du Parc,” where Gabriele D'Annunzio also stayed. Newly renovated, the building housed the headquarters of the Catholic newspaper Il Cittadino from 1959 until its closure in 1974. The building, currently owned by the Archdiocese of Genoa, is home to the diocesan periodical “Il Settimanale Cattolico,” the offices of the “Liturgical Apostolate,” and various secular and religious bodies. The building was best known for its vast park, now much downsized and on whose grounds now stand the Cassini High School, a parking lot and the courts of the Genoa Tennis Club.

==== Fountain in Colombo Square ====
In the center of Colombo Square is the 17th-century fountain of the "Genio Marino," transported here from the Royal Bridge. The baroque “barchile,” built in 1643 by G. B. Orsolino to a design by Ottavio and Pietro Antonio Corradi, commissioned by the protectors of the Bank of Saint George, had the function of supplying water to ships in port.

Inaugurated in 1646, it was later embellished with Jacopo Garvo's statue of a winged Pheme playing a sea shell. The statue stands in the center of a large marble bowl supported by four caryatids.

The monument in 1861 was moved by municipal resolution to Colombo Square, serving as a watering trough for the pack animals of the fruit and vegetable vendors and for the horses of the streetcars in service to the Bisagno Valley.

==== Civic Museum of Natural History “G. Doria” ====
The building in which the museum is housed (Via Brigata Liguria, 9) was built between 1905 and 912, designed by Clodoveo Cordoni. The rich collections of the museum, founded by Marquis Giacomo Doria in 1867, were moved here from their original location in Villetta Di Negro. The building has two floors and includes 23 rooms, in which the zoological collections are displayed, expanded over time from those donated to the museum by the founder himself, who had brought them back from his travels.

Among the most interesting exhibits are the fossilized skeleton of an Elephas antiquus, the largest elephant to have lived in European forests, found in 1941 near Viterbo, and that of a fin whale (Balaenoptera physalus) nearly 20 meters long, stranded in 1878 on the beach at Monterosso al Mare.

In addition to the zoological and paleontological collections, a rich collection of minerals is also on display. The museum also maintains a specialized library, which was created with the donation of Giacomo Doria's books. Since 1922 the Italian Entomological Society has been based at the museum.

==== Theater of Youth ====
The Teatro della Gioventù, now owned by the Region of Liguria, is located on Cesarea Street. Built in 1930 to a design by Giuseppe Crosa di Vergagni, as the headquarters of the Opera Nazionale Balilla, after years of decay it was completely renovated in 2004 and transformed into a multifunctional hall equipped with modern technologies that ensure its use even by the hearing-impaired. It is used for theater plays, rock and jazz concerts and other theatrical and musical events.

==== Margherita Theater ====
Teatro Margherita, originally built in 1854 to a design by architect Orsolini, and opened in 1855. Described as “magnificent” already in its first construction, it was located just outside the Porta degli Archi, near what is now the Monumental Bridge. Originally called "Andrea Doria Theater," capable of accommodating two thousand spectators, in the last decade of the 19th century it was renamed "Politeama Regina Margherita," in honor of King Umberto I's consort. The theater, which was accessed from Via XX Settembre through an open portal at No. 18 on the street, was remodeled in 1938; destroyed by a bombing in 1943, it was rebuilt between 1954 and 1957. Inaugurated again in 1957, it was intended for plays and musicals but pending the reconstruction of the Teatro Carlo Felice, which was also destroyed by bombing in World War II, for thirty years it also hosted concerts and opera performances of the Teatro Comunale dell'Opera.

In 1991, with the inauguration of the rebuilt Teatro Carlo Felice, and the opera season thus having ceased, the theater hosted mainly plays, comedies, modern theater, and concerts. It continued performances until mid-1993, when ownership decided to sell the building. The last performance was Paolo Rossi's Pop a rebelot, a show specially staged “to the bitter end” in an attempt to save the theater's fortunes, starring Enzo Jannacci and Dario Vergassola. With the possibility of renovation having died amidst controversy, the structure was modified and adapted to house a Coin chain shopping mall, which opened in 1998.

==== Oriental Market ====
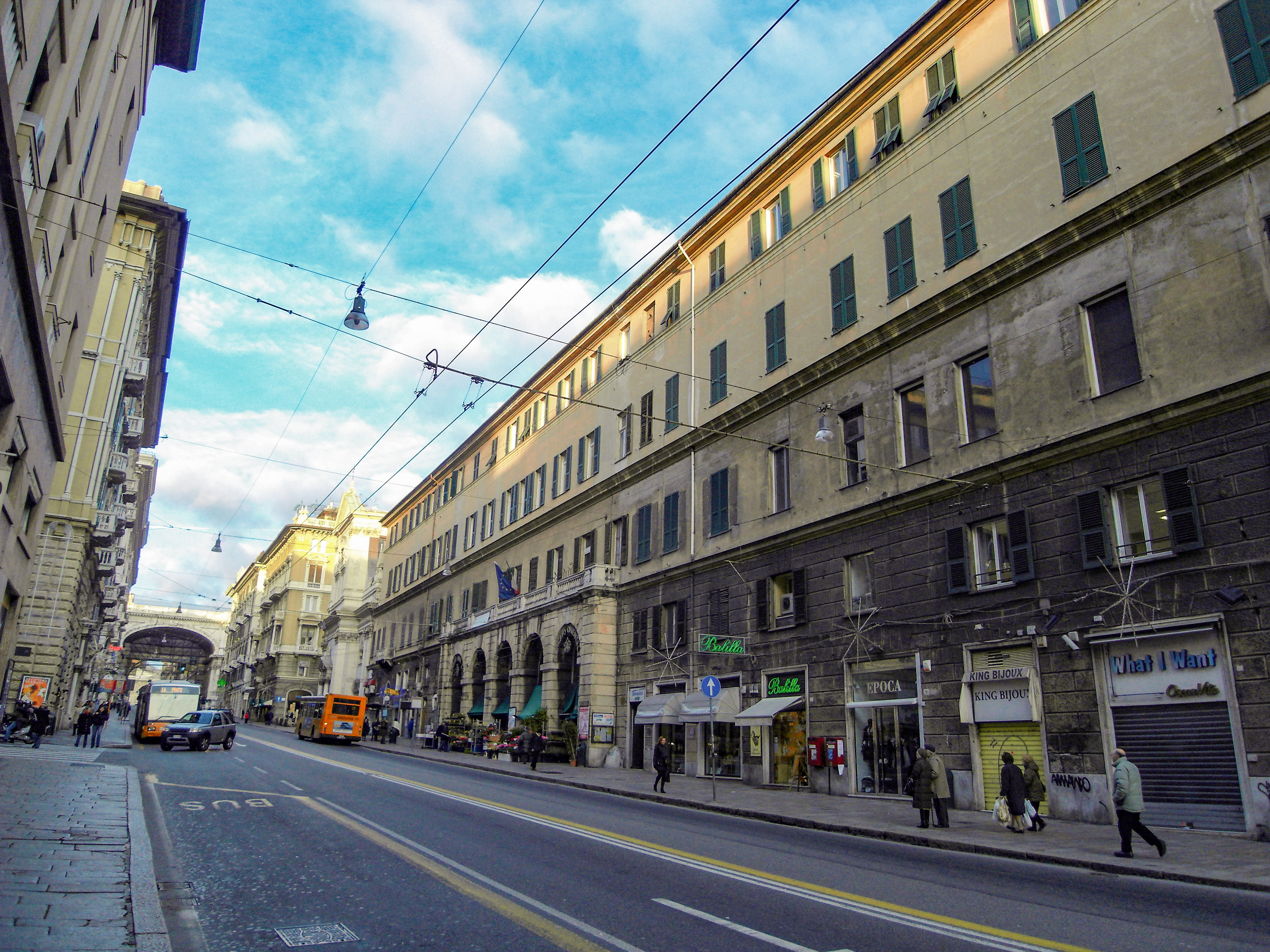
The Mercato Orientale building from the side of Via XX Settembre

The “Mercato Orientale,” named after its location, to the east of the city, although today it is in the city center, is located between Via XX Settembre, Via Galata and Via Colombo, with access from all these streets.

Designed by municipal engineers Verroggio, Bisagno and Cordoni to give a permanent home to the market for agricultural products arriving from the Bisagno Valley, which until then was held in Piazza De Ferrari, it was inaugurated in 1899.

The market occupies the area of the cloister of the Augustinian convent attached to the Consolation Church.

The building includes an underground floor divided into 42 warehouses and a first floor formed by a columned perimeter arcade that stretches for about 360 meters. Initially outdoors, the market was later covered by skylights to increase the available interior space. The building, the first in reinforced concrete built in Genoa, occupies an area of 5500 square meters. The interior decorations are in white marble, while the original stone floor is now partially covered by concrete. The wing of the building facing Via XX Settembre housed for years the financial offices, which since 1931 have been transferred to the new headquarters in Via Fiume.

==== National Institute for the Deaf-Mutes ====
The complex housing the Istituto Nazionale Sordomuti (now the Assarotti Foundation) is located in the upstream part of the district, at the corner of Via Serra and Salita S. Bartolomeo degli Armeni, a short distance from Piazza Corvetto.

The institute was founded in the early 19th century by Father Ottavio Assarotti (1753-1829), of the order of the Scolopians. The religious, impressed by a young deaf-mute, who despite his impairment and lack of education showed a lively intelligence, wanted to teach him to communicate with the help of gestures and later also with writing. Before long, he took in five more deaf-mutes, thus opening in Genoa in 1802 the first school dedicated to them, the third in Italy after those in Rome and Naples. The institute in 1805 obtained, through a decree of Emperor Napoleon Bonaparte, public recognition, and in 1811 it was given a home in the former monastery of the Bridgettines, which, renovated by Gaetano Cantone, began to function in December of the following year. Workshops were established to teach young deaf-mutes the trades most in demand at the time: shoemaking, blacksmithing, and carpentry for men, and sewing and embroidery for women. The institute was state-of-the-art at the time, and numerous scholars came from all over Italy to learn Assarotti's teaching methods. The teaching activity continued after the founder's death with his successors, following the evolution of teaching methods.

In 1927, the institute obtained recognition as a state public school, with new educational programs. The complex was severely damaged during World War II and rebuilt in 1946. In 2003, the historic institute changed its legal status and name to “Fondazione Padre Assarotti - Istituto Sordomuti ONLUS Genova.”

The complex also includes the church of Our Lady of Mercy, built together with the monastery in 1667. The interior, with a single nave, is devoid of decoration. The most significant work there is the altarpiece of the “Madonna with St. Lawrence and St. John,” painted by Bernardo Strozzi in 1629, shortly before his move to Venice. On the high altar is a Baroque machine depicting Our Lady of Mercy appearing to Blessed Botta. In the presbytery, in a 16th-century urn by Taddeo Carlone, rest the remains of Father Assarotti.

=== Religious architecture ===
Disappeared religious buildings

During the 19th century, the implementation of the city's eastward expansion plan resulted in the disappearance of two historic convent complexes: that of St. Mary of Peace and that of N.S. of Refuge.

- Church and convent of N.S. della Pace
- Conservatory of Our Lady of Refuge. The complex of N.S. del Rifugio, with the adjoining church, stood in what is now Piazza Brignole. It included the convent of the Sisters of Our Lady of Refuge in Mount Calvary, known as Brignolines, and the "Conservatory of the Daughters of N.S. of Refuge," where young girls from disadvantaged families were housed and trained. The complex was built in 1650 at the behest of Emanuele Brignole (founder of the Albergo dei Poveri), to give a permanent home to the institute founded by Virginia Centurione Bracelli, already present in the area since 1631 in a rented property. From the name of their benefactor, who personally financed most of the expense, the nuns were named “Brignolines.” In 1868, the nuns had to abandon the complex, which was demolished for the construction of the Brignole train station, and moved to its current location in Marassi. In 2009, during work on the construction of the Brignole subway station, the foundations of the building emerged, beneath which archaeological finds dating back to the Neolithic period were found.

==== Church of Our Lady of Consolation and St. Vincent ====
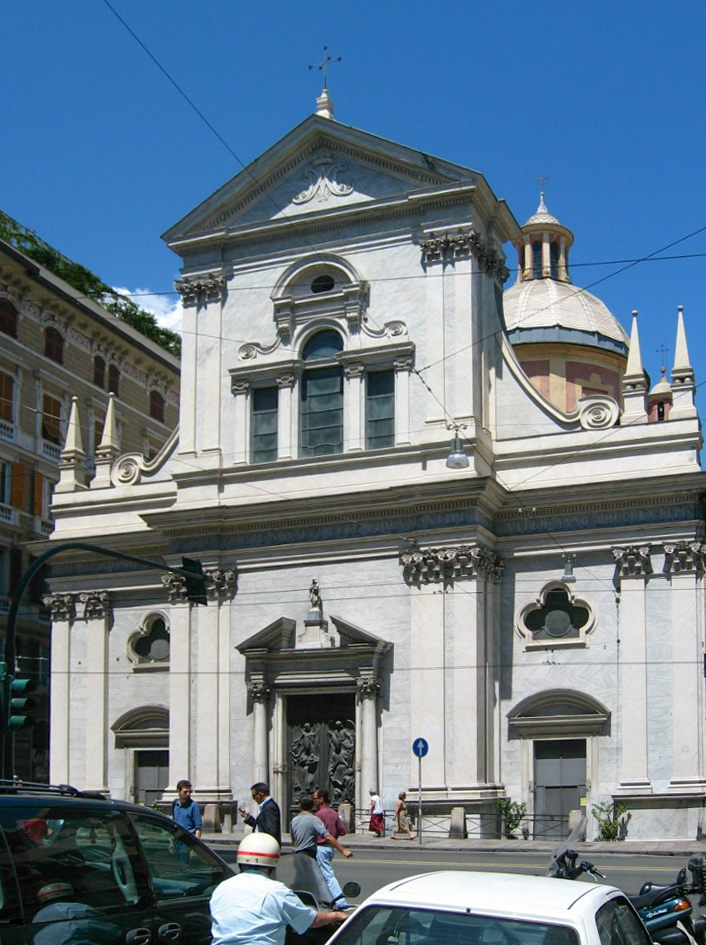
Church of the Consolation

The “Church of Our Lady of Consolation and St. Vincent the Martyr,” known simply as the “Church of Consolation” or also as the “Church of St. Rita,” is located on Via XX Settembre. Its parish is the seat of the Carignano-Foce vicariate of the Archdiocese of Genoa.

The church was built between 1681 and 1706 by the Augustinians, who had had to abandon the previous convent complex that had stood since 1475 on Zerbino Hill, demolished in 1681 because of its proximity to the New Walls, erected in 1632. Work was also begun to build a large cloister, which was never completed and would become the site of the Oriental Market in the late 19th century.

The new church was opened for worship as early as 1693, in 1769 the dome was built, designed by Simone Cantoni, and only in 1864 was the facade completed, by Carlo Biale.

Due to the Napoleonic suppression laws, the Augustinians had to abandon the convent in 1810. In 1813 the church became a parish church, adding to its title that of the defunct church of St. Vincent. The Augustinians, who still rule the parish, returned there in 1816.

Since the return of the Augustinians, throughout the 19th century, various artists helped complete the decoration of the church, which was consecrated in 1875 by Archbishop Paolo Micallef of Pisa.

The church has three naves, separated by quadrangular pillars, with several side chapels. The vaults of the naves, dome and chancel were entirely frescoed in the 19th century. The church preserves numerous works of art from periods ranging from the 15th to the 19th century and a fine 19th-century organ. A remarkable collection of paintings is preserved in the refectory of the adjoining convent.

==== Church of Saints Peter and Paul ====
The Church of Saints Peter and Paul stands upstream from Brignole station, on the Fieschine slope, on the Montesano heights. Its parish is part of the Carignano-Foce vicariate of the Archdiocese of Genoa.

It was built in 1874 to a design by Giovanni Novella as the chapel of the new ecclesiastical boarding school, inaugurated two years earlier on Montesano hill. Consecrated on June 21, 1874 by Archbishop Salvatore Magnasco, it was erected into an autonomous vicariate in 1961 and into a parish in 1968 by decrees of Cardinal Siri.

The modestly sized church has a round shape and is topped by a dome; it preserves some works by early 20th-century painters and a statue of Our Lady of the Guard by Antonio Canepa.

The Genoa Ecclesiastical Boarding School, housing elderly and sick priests, which still exists in the building adjacent to the church, was established in 1841 on the initiative of Archbishop Placido Maria Tadini and other members of the Genoese clergy, members of the congregation of “Secular Priests of Saints Peter and Paul.” It had several temporary locations until in 1848 it was housed inside the Brignoline convent; it was finally moved to its present location after the convent's demolition in 1868.

==== Former Church of the Holy Spirit ====
The church of Santo Spirito, now suppressed, whose earliest documented records date back to 1157, overlooks Via San Vincenzo. It later passed (it is not known at what time) to the Poor Clare nuns, who erected a monastery nearby, who were succeeded in 1579 by the Somaschi Fathers, who kept it until its closure due to the suppression laws enacted in the Napoleonic period (1798). The religious and literary scholar Bernardo Laviosa (1736-1810) lived in the convent of S. Spirito for some years.

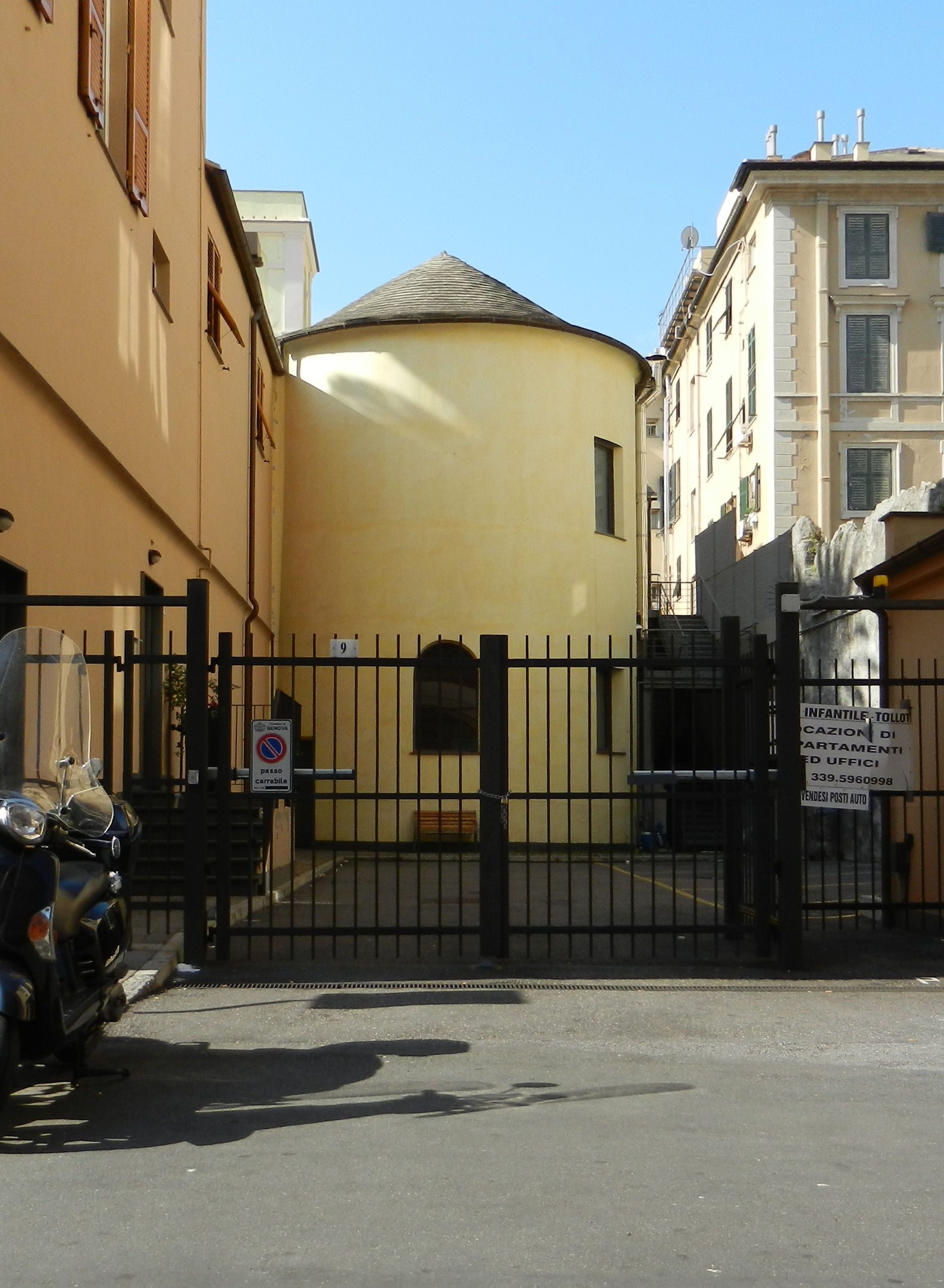
The former church of Santo Spirito, as seen from Tollot Street

In 1771 in some premises adjoining the convent the noblewoman Argentina Imperiale had founded the “Casa delle Addolorate,” where former prostitutes who intended to change their lives were housed.

After the suppression of the convent, the building, which today corresponds to No. 53 St. Vincent Street, changed its various uses: it first became a School of Charity, intended for the education of the neighborhood's children, then the site of educational institutions and more recently the headquarters of various businesses.

The church has a modest facade, squeezed between the houses on St. Vincent Street, with a small parvise enclosed by a gate. In a niche on the left is a marble statue of Our Lady of Loreto, dated 1730. From the rear of Tollot Street, the typical structure of a religious building is more evident, with a semicircular apse and a severed bell tower.

The interior, with a single nave, had six side chapels and two more in the chancel. One of the chapels, dedicated to St. John the Baptist, was commissioned by Doge Agostino Pinelli. Some marble bas-reliefs in the chapels and some frescoes in the sacristy remain inside, although the hall has been lofted. After the suppression, many works of art that were kept there were dispersed. In 1856, when the church had already been closed for some time, the altar, statues and marbles were transferred to the church of N.S. della Neve in Bolzaneto, where they can still be seen today.

==== Former church of San Vincenzo ====
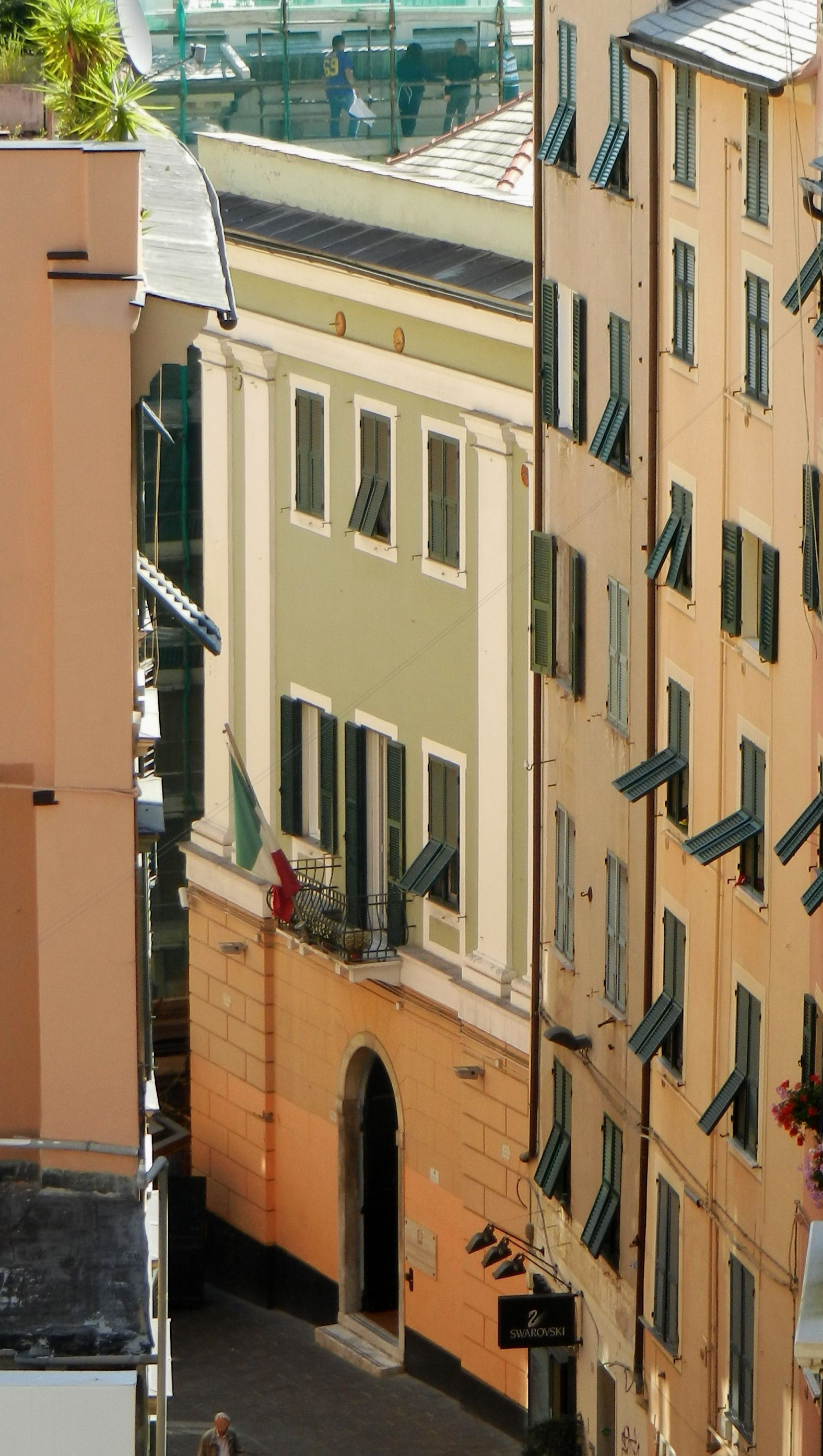
The former church of San Vincenzo, as seen from the Ponte Monumentale

The church of San Vincenzo, located on the street of the same name and also closed for worship in the 19th century, is first mentioned in a document from 1059. It was completely rebuilt in the early eighteenth century, as the original medieval church had become inadequate for the village's population; a century later, due to the further increase in inhabitants, the new church also became inadequate, so in 1813 Archbishop Giuseppe Spina transferred the parish title to the nearby church of the Consolation.

The church, with a single nave and five altars, held numerous works of art by 17th- and 18th-century Genoese artists, including Agostino Ratti, who was also buried there. After it was closed for worship, most of the works of art were transferred to the Consolation Church.

The building, after being decommissioned, was given to the state property; profoundly remodeled by architect Giovan Battista Resasco, who remodeled it in the neoclassical style, it became the seat first of the offices of the Military Engineers and then of the Military Court. It currently houses the “Army Officers' Club.”

==== Oratory of the Souls and the Belt ====
Adjacent to the former church of St. Vincent, overlooking a small square accessed by a narrow alley next to the church, closed by a small gate, is the “Oratory of the Souls of Purgatory and Our Lady of the Belt.”

The building was built in 1625 by the confraternity of the Rosary on the alleged ruins of the oratory "ad sanctos peregrinos," mentioned by Giustiniani. It then passed to the confraternity of the Souls in Purgatory, founded in 1767. At the end of the 19th century, it was joined by the confraternity of the Belt, whose oratory, which stood near the church of the Consolation, was destined for demolition for the opening of Via XX Settembre. From the union of these two ancient confraternities, both of Augustinian derivation, came the present “confraternity of the Souls in Purgatory and Our Lady of the Belt”

The cult of Our Lady of the Belt is an Augustinian devotion, based on a tradition according to which Our Lady offered St. Monica, and through her son Augustine, her own belt as a sign of conversion and union with God, asking the two saints to bind other souls to God with it. The Augustinians favored the birth of confraternities with this title: the first, in 1486, was the one established at the church of St. Augustine in Sarzano, then, toward the end of the sixteenth century, also at that of the Consolation in Artoria, which in the eighteenth century was moved to the present church.

The oratory, externally very simple, is decorated inside with frescoes in full Genoese Baroque style. A number of 17th-century paintings are preserved there, but the most significant work is the wooden statue of the “Madonna of the Belt,” by Giambattista Bissoni (c. 1640), formerly in the church of S. Agostino in Sarzano, purchased by the confraternity in 1834. The premises of the sacristy house the confraternity's endowment, including processional sticks, processional crucifixes, hoods and capes worn by the brethren during ceremonies and processions.

==== Monastery of Saints James and Philip ====
The monastic complex, located in the vicinity of Via Assarotti, was founded in 1266 (1253 according to Accinelli) by a group of Dominican nuns on the site of a primitive church dedicated to St. Peregrine, which had been built in 1224 by a certain Giovanni da Promontorio. It flourished until the 15th century, when it suffered a slow decline due to the nuns' behavior, which had provoked several interventions by the religious authorities of the time. Between the 16th and 18th centuries there was a flourishing of the community, which experienced moments of great prosperity, highlighted by new decorations and continuous improvements to buildings and furnishings. Remaining unscathed by the Napoleonic suppression laws, although nuns from other suppressed orders converged there, the complex was partially expropriated by the Savoy government in 1851 and some buildings were demolished for the opening of Via Assarotti. In 1859 the nuns abandoned the convent, which was converted into a school building, while the church became the seat of the Court of Assizes. The complex was severely damaged by bombing during World War II. A plaque in the chapter house recalls that Pope Pius VII in 1815 celebrated a mass in the church inside the convent. The complex was completely renovated between 2010 and 2015 and used for office and residential purposes.

=== Military architecture ===
The district, as already mentioned, once outside the sixteenth-century walls, was later included in the seventeenth-century "New Walls." What remains of the two circles of walls delimits the present neighborhood.

“From the interior of the city one enters the sestiere of S. Vincenzo through five gates: of the Arco, or S. Stefano; of Portoria; of Acquasola; of Portello; and of Carbonara. One could add the sixth, called Santa Chiara, which was opened around 1819; but since from 1822 onward it has only opened for public service, it is not for the use of the inhabitants of the area. To those who wish to go outside the city five gates are wide open: Pila, Romana, Montaldo, S. Bernardino, and Chiappe.”

— Goffredo Casalis, "Geographical, historical, statistical and commercial dictionary of the states of HM the King of Sardinia", 1840

==== Sixteenth-century walls ====
A section of the sixteenth-century walls, from the Acquasola bastion to the Cappuccine walls, passing through the Mura di S. Chiara and the Mura del Prato, delimits the area of S. Vincenzo from those of Portoria and Carignano. These walls are still well preserved: above them runs the present Corso A. Podestà, which bypasses Via XX Settembre passing over the Monumental Bridge. Open in these walls were the gates of Acquasola (which disappeared with the construction of Piazza Corvetto), Portoria (also called Olivella or S. Caterina), which still exists and connected the village of S. Vincenzo, through the Salita della Tosse, with the center of Piccapietra, near the old Pammatone Hospital, and finally the main one, Porta degli Archi or S. Stefano, which stood where the Monumental Bridge is today.

===== Gate of the Arches =====
Built in 1539 to a design by Giovanni Maria Olgiati, it was decorated on the outer side with Doric travertine columns and surmounted by a statue of St. Stephen, made by Taddeo Carlone. In 1896, following the construction of Via XX Settembre and the construction of the Monumental Bridge, it was dismantled and rebuilt at the Mura del Prato, on Via R.Banderali, near the D'Oria High School. A plaque commemorates the relocation of the gate.

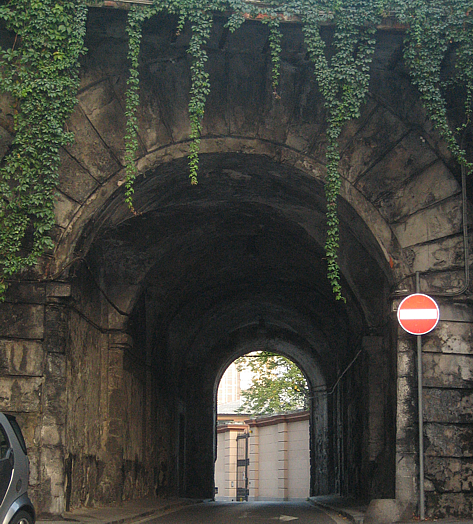
St. Catherine's Gate

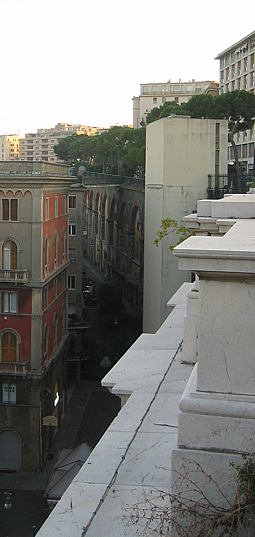
Walls of St. Clare, near the Monumental Bridge

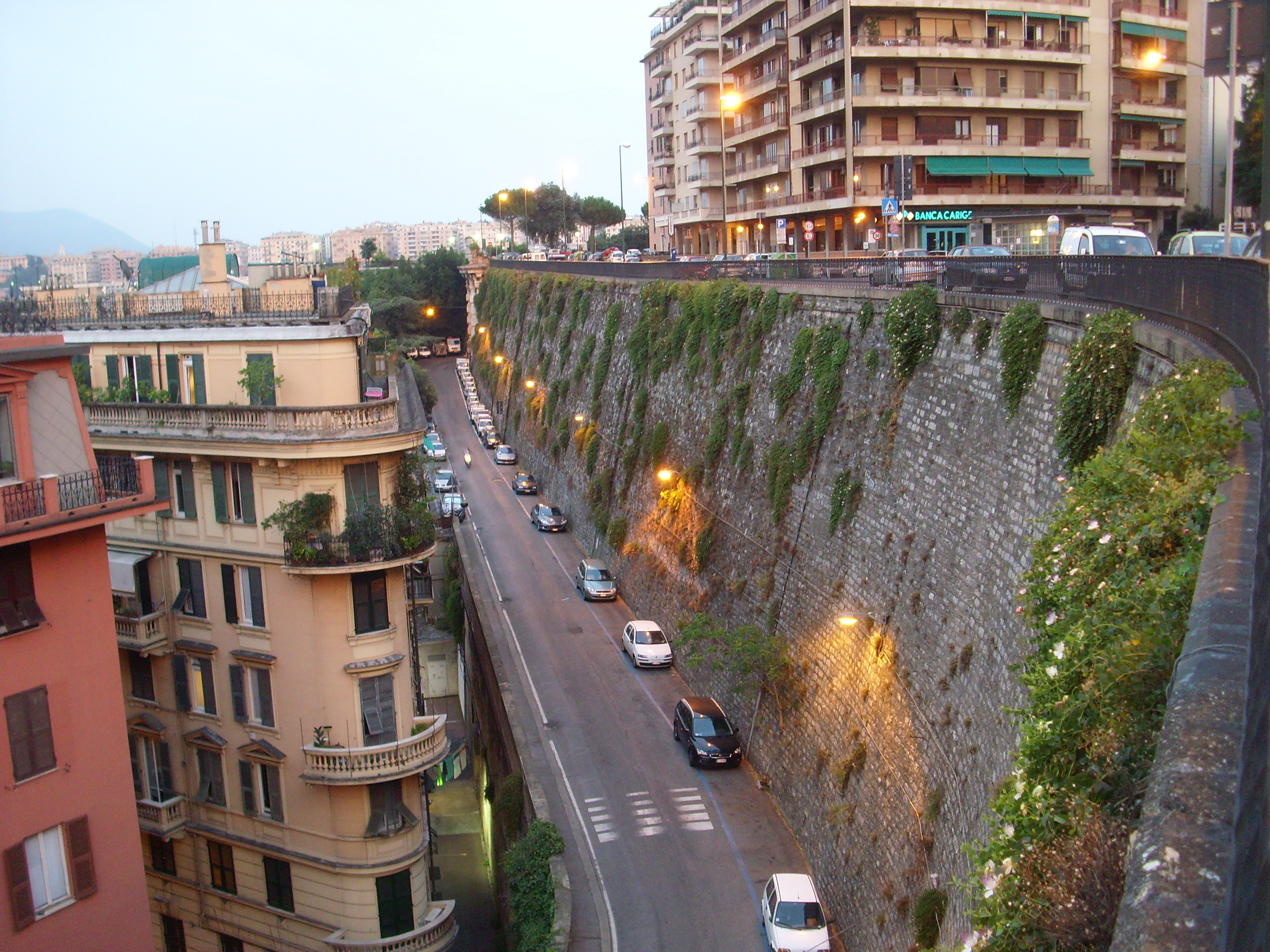
Mura del Prato (at the end of the street one glimpses the Porta degli Archi in its current location)

==== New Walls ====
Almost nothing remains of the 17th-century walls in the S. Vincenzo area. The mighty wall that descended from the Zerbino hill ends today on the Montesano heights, while the entire section placed in defense of the city along the right bank of the Bisagno, the so-called Fronti Basse, was completely dismantled in the late nineteenth century to allow the urban development of the city towards the east. Two gates opened between these ramparts, the monumental Porta Pila and the more modest Porta Romana. The latter, so named because it was located along the medieval via “Romana” which, crossing the Bisagno River, continued eastward, was located at the entrance of via San Vincenzo, corner of via Fiume. It was demolished in 1891 along with the Fronti Basse.

===== Porta Pila =====
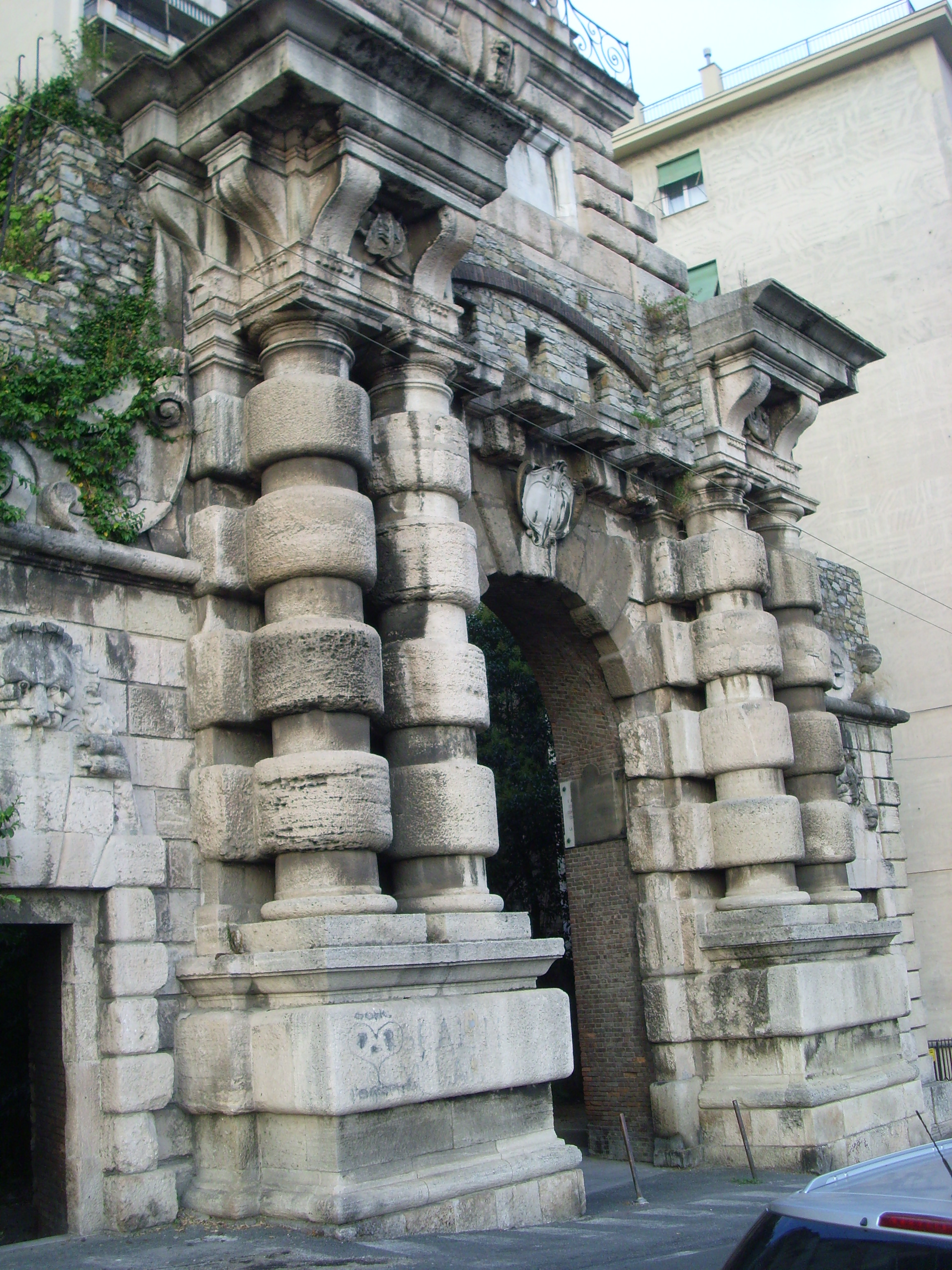
Porta Pila in its current location

The monumental Porta Pila, access into the city for those coming from the eastern suburbs, stood at the intersection of today's Via XX Settembre and Via Fiume. Designed by Bartolomeo Bianco, according to some sources it was built in 1633; according to others the gate, originally intended for the fortifications of Porto Maurizio, was transported to Genoa between 1647 and 1649.

When the demolition of the Fronti Basse was decided in 1891, the gate remained for a few years to mark the entrance to Via XX Settembre; in 1898 its demolition was decreed, but due to the opposition of many citizens it was decided to dismantle it and relocate it in the Montesano Bastion, behind the Brignole train station. In 1951, for the expansion of the railway park, it was again disassembled and moved to its present site along Montesano Street. The gate is surmounted by a statue of the Madonna, made by the Lombard sculptor Domenico Scorticone from Lombardy to a design by Domenico Fiasella.

== Society ==
=== Education ===
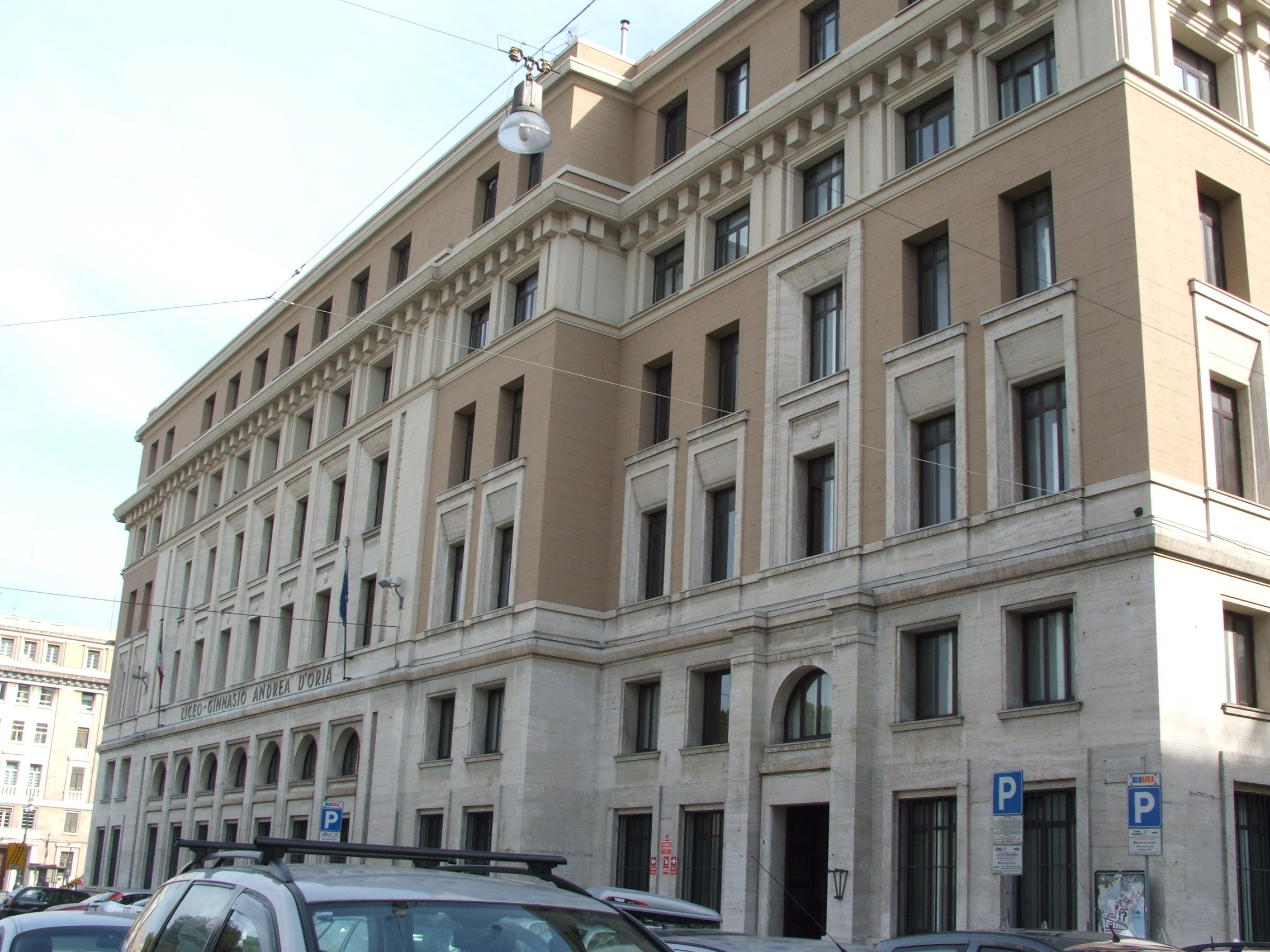
The Liceo-Ginnasio “Andrea D'Oria”

A number of ancient Genoese educational institutions are located in the S. Vincenzo district.

- Liceo-Ginnasio Andrea D'Oria. Founded in 1824 as a school of higher studies, in its first location in Stradone Sant'Agostino, in the Sarzano area, it assumed its present name in 1849. In 1937 it was moved to its current location on Via Diaz.
- Gian Domenico Cassini Scientific High School. Founded in 1923, since the early 1960s it has been based in Viale Sauli, in a newly constructed building built within the grounds of Villa Serra. In the panorama of Genoese anti-fascism, it is remembered because it was attended by some members of the Resistance (Buranello, Issel and Fillak, the latter of whom was expelled from the high school for his antifascist militancy).
- Vittorino da Feltre Institute. The institute named after the Venetian humanist was founded in 1876 by the Barnabite Fathers, and was located at no. 10 Salita S. Caterina. Purchased in 1895 by the Da Passano marquises, in the early 20th century it was moved to its current location in Via Maragliano, near Via XX Settembre, built on part of the area of the former Franciscan convent of S. Maria della Pace. The institute, which today belongs to a private company, is still run by the Barnabites, who have always maintained its management even after changes in ownership. It includes the entire primary and junior high school cycle and a scientific high school.

== Infrastructure and transportation ==
=== Urban roads ===
Of the urban streets in the district today, only Via XX Settembre, with its neighboring Via Fiume and Via Brigata Liguria, still partially plays a role as an urban link between the city center and the east, while the other streets are only functional for homes and businesses that overlook them.

=== Highways ===
The nearest highway exit is Genova-Est on the A12 Genoa-Livorno freeway, which is located in the Staglieno district, 5 km away.

=== Railways ===
Genova Brignole railway station is located a few hundred meters from the center of the district.

=== Urban transportation ===
- Subway. The neighborhood is served by Brignole station, the eastern terminus of the Genoa Metro. Adjacent to the train station of the same name, this station entered service on December 22, 2012, with the opening of the De Ferrari-Brignole section.
- Buses. Numerous AMT city bus lines run through the district, connecting the city center with Sampierdarena, the Levante, Val Bisagno, and the hilly areas.
- Public elevators. The Ponte Monumentale public elevator has been in operation since 1959, connecting Via XX Settembre to Corso A. Podestà.

=== Airports ===
- Genoa Cristoforo Colombo Airport - 12 km.

=== Hospitals ===
- Galliera Hospital - less than 1 km
- San Martino Hospital - 3 km.

== See also ==
- Portoria
- Carignano

== Bibliography ==
- Guida d'Italia - Liguria [Italy Guide - Liguria] (in Italian). Milano: TCI. 2009.
- Caraceni Poleggi, Fiorella (1984). Genova - Guida Sagep [Genoa - Sagep Guide] (in Italian). SAGEP Editrice - Automobile Club di Genova.
- Alizeri, Federico (1846). Guida artistica per la città di Genova [Artistic guide for the city of Genoa] (in Italian). Genova: Gio. Grondona Q. Giuseppe.
- Casalis, Goffredo (1840). Dizionario geografico, storico, statistico e commerciale degli stati di S.M. il Re di Sardegna [Geographical, historical, statistical and commercial dictionary of the states of HM the King of Sardinia] (in Italian). Torino: G. Maspero.
- Finauri, Stefano (2007). Forti di Genova: storia, tecnica e architettura dei fortini difensivi [Forts of Genoa: history, technique and architecture of defensive forts] (in Italian). Genova: Edizioni Servizi Editoriali. ISBN 978-88-89384-27-5.
