= Daniello =

Daniello is both a masculine Italian given name and a surname. Notable people with the name include:

== Given name ==
- Daniello Bartoli (1608–1685), Italian Jesuit writer and historiographer
- Daniello Concina (1687–1756), Italian Dominican preacher, controversialist and theologian
- Daniello Marco Delfino (1653–1704), Italian cardinal
- Daniello Porri (died 1566), Italian Renaissance painter
- Daniello Solaro, Italian Baroque sculptor

== Surname ==
- Joe Daniello, American animation director
- Ralph Daniello (1886–1925), American mobster
