= Santa Maria delle Vigne =

Basilica church in Genoa, Italy

Coordinates: 44°24′34″N 8°55′53″E

Basilica di Santa Maria delle Vigne
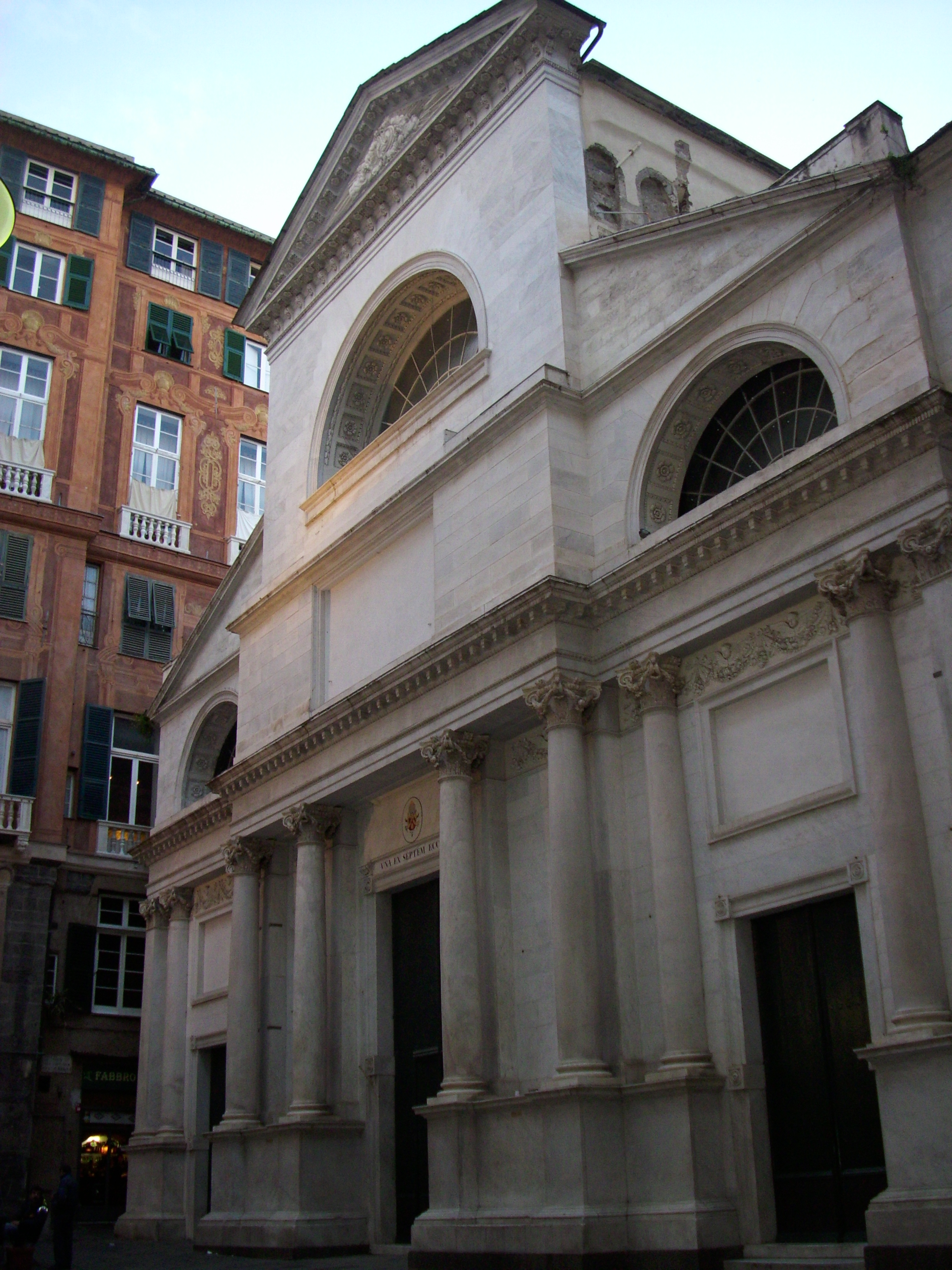
- The façade of the Basilica

Religion
- Affiliation: Roman Catholic
- Province: Genoa
- Ecclesiastical or organisational status: National monument
- Status: Active

Location
- Location: Genoa, Italy
- Interactive map of Basilica di Santa Maria delle Vigne

Architecture
- Type: Church
- Style: Romanesque; Baroque; Neoclassical

Santa Maria delle Vigne is a Catholic basilica in Genoa, Italy. It was built in the 10th century. The church is the final resting place of the leading early Italian composer Alessandro Stradella, who was murdered in 1682.

== History ==
Situated outside of the Carolingian-era walls, in what is now the heart of the historical center, a short distance from the cathedral of San Siro, the basilica is considered the most ancient shrine to the Virgin Mary in Genoa. A chapel dedicated to the Virgin Mary had been built in this place by the 6th century, as a response to a Marian apparition to Argenta of the Grillo family.

On the site of this first sacred building, shortly before the year 1000, a church was built, named Santa Maria delle Vigne because it was located in the center of an area containing vineyards.

In the middle of the 10th century, the farm where the chapel was built belonged to a viscount, Idone, who gave it to his son Oberto. Around 980, Oberto, together with Guido di Carmandino, promoted the construction of the new church on the site of the ancient chapel. The first official reports of the new building date back to the Registrum Curiae of 1083. A collegiate church was also founded, which appears in a document of 1061, where it was mentioned as having existed for a long time. In 1222, Pope Honorius III issued a papal bull, fixing the number of canons at 12 and establishing the rules of the community. The provost of the chapter still holds the title of Prelate of Honour of His Holiness.

A town arose around the church in the 12th century, and was incorporated together with San Siro in the urban fabric of a city which was growing and now extended outside its early Carolingian walls. It was consecrated in 1117, and in 1147, shortly before the new "Barbarossa walls" contained it within the town limits, the church became the parish church of what would shortly become one of the liveliest commercial districts near the Port of Genoa. The construction of the campanile, the only Romanesque structure remaining after the renovations of future centuries, also dates to this period.

Additional work was done in the 13th century, including to the roof. The first major alterations to the original Romanesque complex began in 1585, financed by Agapito Grillo, when it was decided to extend the apse up to the area of the cemetery behind it, and expand the side apses with chapels on either side of the main altar. The extensions were carried out by the architect Gaspare della Corte. The Chapel of the Crucifix has a marble covering, added by Taddeo Carlone in 1587.

In 1646, during a pastoral visit by cardinal Stefano Durazzo, the cardinal arranged for additional renovations. These renovations included the opening of three semicircular windows and an overhaul of the naves, with the replacement of the columns and the construction of the cupola, and were entrusted to the architect Daniele Casella. With the transformation of the interior in Baroque style, the chapels and side altars were also enriched with paintings and sculptures by the confraternities and noble families.

Around 1820 the frescoes in the vaults were completed. Between 1841 and 1848, a new marble facade, done in Neoclassical style, was added to the church; it was designed by Ippolito Cremona. Since the addition of the facade, the building has not undergone any substantial modifications.

On January 8, 1983, Pope John Paul II issued a papal brief, bestowing on the church the title of minor basilica.

== Interior decoration ==
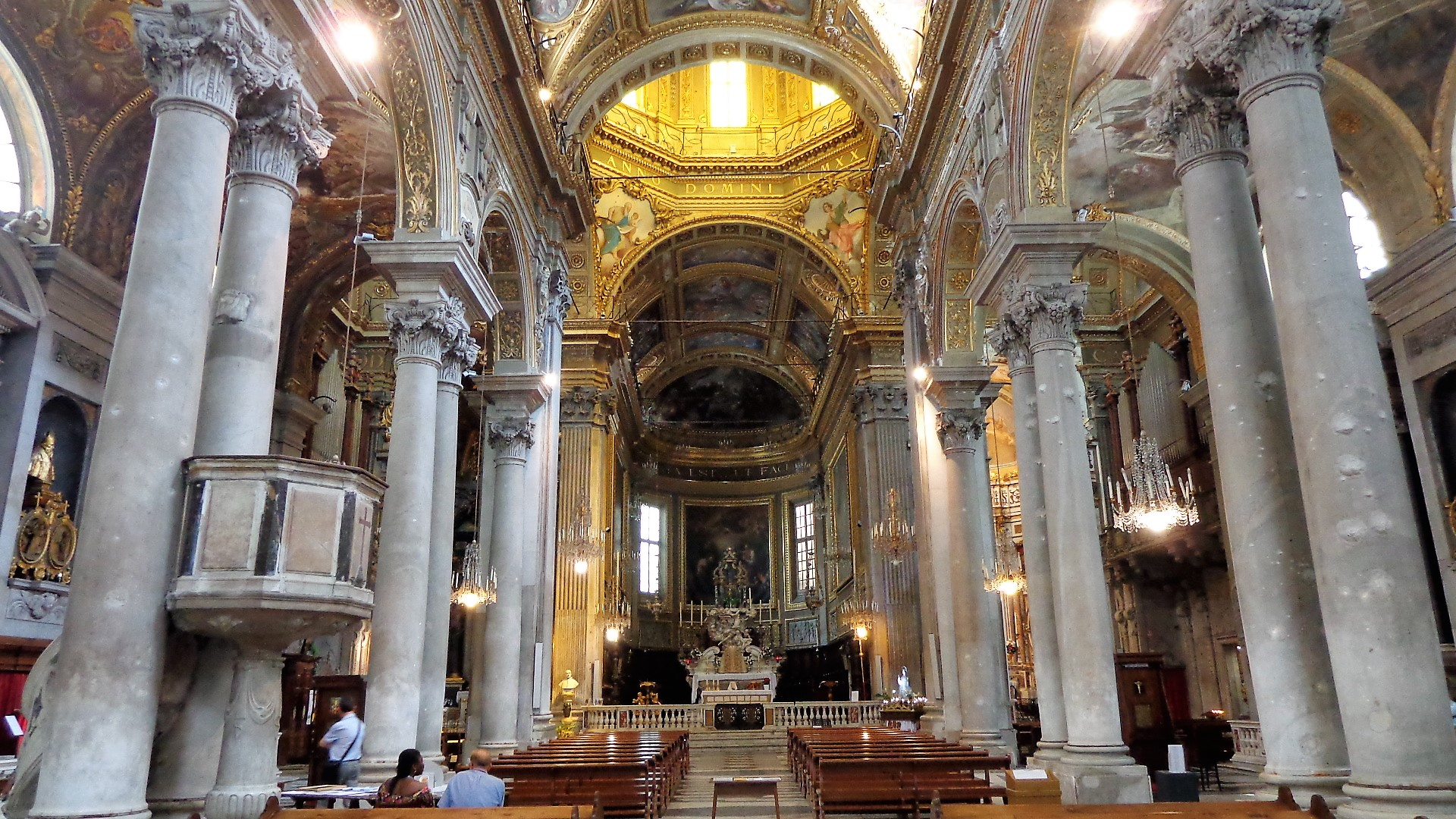
Interior of the basilica

- Madonna with Saints Leonardo and Stefano (18th century) by Domenico Parodi
- Madonna, Child, and Angels (c 1465) attributed to Giovanni Mazone
- San Michele (c. 1680) by Gregorio De Ferrari
- St Catherine (central panel of polyptych 1476 and 1494, by Francesco da Pavia
- Ten Thousand Crucifixions (1580) by Bernardo Castello
- Last Supper (17th century) derived from Oratory of San Giacomo delle Fucine by Simone Balli
- Birth of the Virgin (1784) by Giuseppe Cades
- A Crucifix, Madonna, and St John, statues attributed to Anton Maria Maragliano
- Triumph of the Cross (c. 1690) and Vision of St John of the Cross (c. 1685) by Domenico Piola
- Madonna and child (Late Gothic statue in right portal)
- Epiphany (1819) and Apparition of Christ before his Mother (1820) by Santo Tagliafichi
- Madonna and Child (1616) by Giovanni and Tommaso Orsolino
- Statues of Christ and St. Peter by Michele Sansebastiano
- Annunciation (1787) in the presbytery, by Carlo Giuseppe Ratti
- Repose during Escape to Egypt (c. 1820) by Felice Vinelli
- Madonna (1397) attributed to Taddeo di Bartolo
- Presentation of the Virgin (1785) by Giovanni David
- Visitation (c. 1820) by Giuseppe Passano
- Trinity and Saints (1770) by Carlo Giuseppe Ratti
- Annunciation (1690) by Giovanni Andrea Carlone
- Virgin with Saints Lawrence, Liborio, and Phillip Neri (1681) by Giovanni Battista Casone
- Tomb of Doctor Anselmo (1304); sarcophagus with second century with reliefs of Death of Phaedra
- Marble relief by Saints John the Baptist and Rocco intercede for souls in Purgatory (1670) by Daniello Solaro

== People connected to the basilica ==
Musician Alessandro Stradella (1644-1682) is buried in the church. On February 25, 1682, he was fatally stabbed during his stay in Genoa by hired assassins. A nobleman, Giovan Battista Lomellini, was suspected of responsibility, but was acquitted due to insufficient evidence. Lomellini's presumed motive was a belief that Stradella, who was giving Lomellini's sister music lessons, was also in a relationship with her.

On April 16, 1815, while taking refuge in Genoa during Napoleon's Hundred Days, Pope Pius VII visited the church and celebrated Mass there.

Giacomo della Chiesa, the future Pope Benedict XV, was baptized in the church in 1854. He lived nearby in his family's mansion on Salita Santa Caterina, and was always particularly connected to his parish church.

Other people connected to the basilica include: Sister Elisa Giuseppina Mezzana, co-founder of the Sisters of the Divine Will; Eugenia Maria Ravasco, founder of the Daughters of the Sacred Hearts of Jesus and Mary (beatified in 2003); Itala Mela, mystic and Christian apologist (beatified in 2017); Cardinal Gaetano Alimonda; and Rosa Maria Benedetta Gattorno Custo, founder of the Daughters of Saint Anna (beatified in 2000).
