= Simone Balli =

Italian painter

Simone Balli (born c. 1580 in Florence) was an Italian painter of the 17th century. He settled in Genoa in 1600, where he mainly painted. He trained with Aurelio Lomi, and painted often small cabinet pieces on copper, for example for the Spinola palace in Cornigliano (Genoa). He also painted for the church of Santa Maria delle Vigne, the Carmine, and the Oratory of St. Bartholemew in Genoa.
