= Anilio =

Anilio (Greek: Ανήλιο) may refer to several villages in Greece:

- Anilio, Elis, a village in Elis
- Anilio, Ioannina, a village in the Ioannina regional unit
- Anilio, Magnesia, a village in Magnesia
