= Ianniello =

Ianniello is a surname of Italian origin. Notable people with the surname include:

- Joseph Ianniello (born 1968), American media executive
- Matthew Ianniello (1920–2012), New York mobster with the Genovese crime family
