= Aniello Portio =

Aniello Portio was an Italian engraver, who worked at Naples from 1690 to 1700.
