= Faniello =

Faniello is a surname. Notable people with the name include:

- Claudia Faniello (born 1988), Maltese singer
- Fabrizio Faniello (born 1981), Maltese singer
