= Daniello Porri =

Italian painter of the Renaissance from Parma

Daniello Porri (died 1566) was an Italian painter of the Renaissance, active in his native Parma as a portrait and historical painter in the early years of the 16th century. His family was Milanese by origin. He worked under both Correggio and Parmigianino, and afterwards in collaboration with Taddeo Zuccari in the church of Santa Maria d'Alvito. Of their combined work only a Madonna and child between St. Francis and St. Nicholas of Bari remains. He is also called de Por or Porr or Porro and also as da Parma.
