= Anielew =

Anielew may refer to:

- Anielew, Greater Poland Voivodeship, a village in the Gmina Kramsk, Konin County, Poland
- Anielew, Masovian Voivodeship, a village in the Gmina Mińsk Mazowiecki, Mińsk County, Poland
