= Michele Sansebastiano =

Italian sculptor (1852–1908)

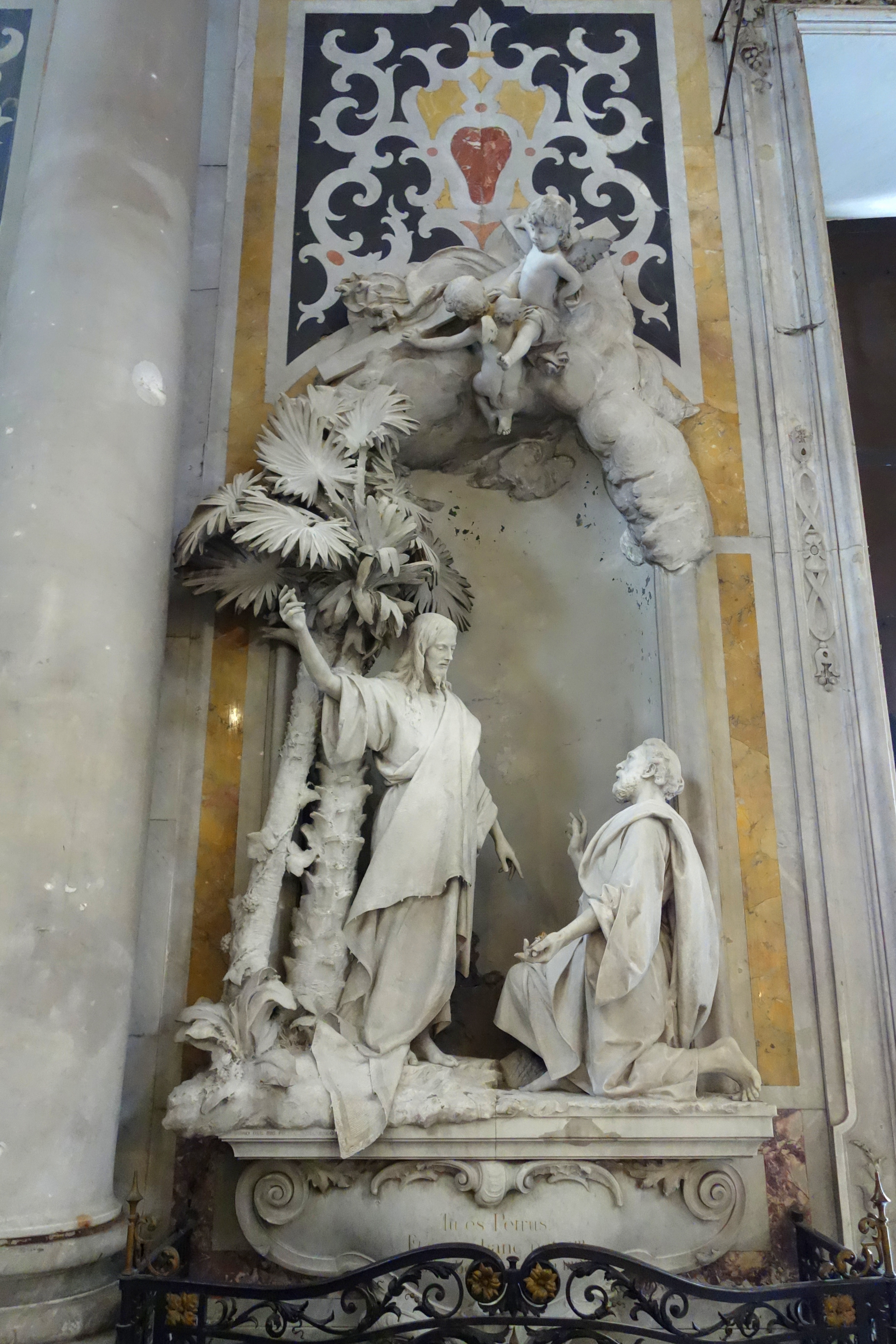
Christ and St. Peter by Michele Sansebastiano, 1896, in Santa Maria delle Vigne, Genoa

Michele Sansebastiano or Vincenzo Michelangelo Sansebastiano (Novi Ligure, September 26, 1852 – Genoa, 1908) was an Italian sculptor, mainly of terra cotta and stucco.

He was first educated in the Accademia Ligustica of Fine Arts of Genoa, and later trained in Florence under Augusto Rivalta. In 1881 he sent to the Genoese Exposition of Fine Arts, a stucco group depicting: I più bei fiori del mio giardino; and 1885 to the same Exhibition, a terra cotta Venus statuette, a small bust depicting the Emperor of Germany, a terracotta Paura ingenua, and the other two titled: Fabbro. Among other works are:

- Monument to the Republic of Brazil, set up in Belém, State of Parà, Brazil.
- Statues of Christ and St Peter (Church of Santa Maria delle Vigne, Genoa)
- Telemons of the "Palazzo dei Giganti" (Genoa, Via XX Settembre)
- Cippo Tagliaferro, Cippo Romanengo-Bussa, Barbieri Tomb (Genoa, Monumental Cemetery of Staglieno)
- Fountain with Putto (Via Roma, Novi Ligure)
- Vernetti and Cambiaggio-Minetto Tomb (Cemetery of Novi Ligure)

Along with Cesare Moreno, he founded in 1883 a factory for the production of ceramic sculpture. In 1898, he was named Academic of Merit of the Accademia Ligustica.
