= Daniello Solaro =

Italian sculptor

Daniello Solaro (circa 1649–1726) was an Italian sculptor of the Baroque period. He was active in Genoa and France. He trained under the Genoese artist Domenico Parodi.
