= Old Harbour (Genoa) =

Historical Landmark of Genoa, Italy

Porto Antico di Genova (Old Harbour of Genoa)
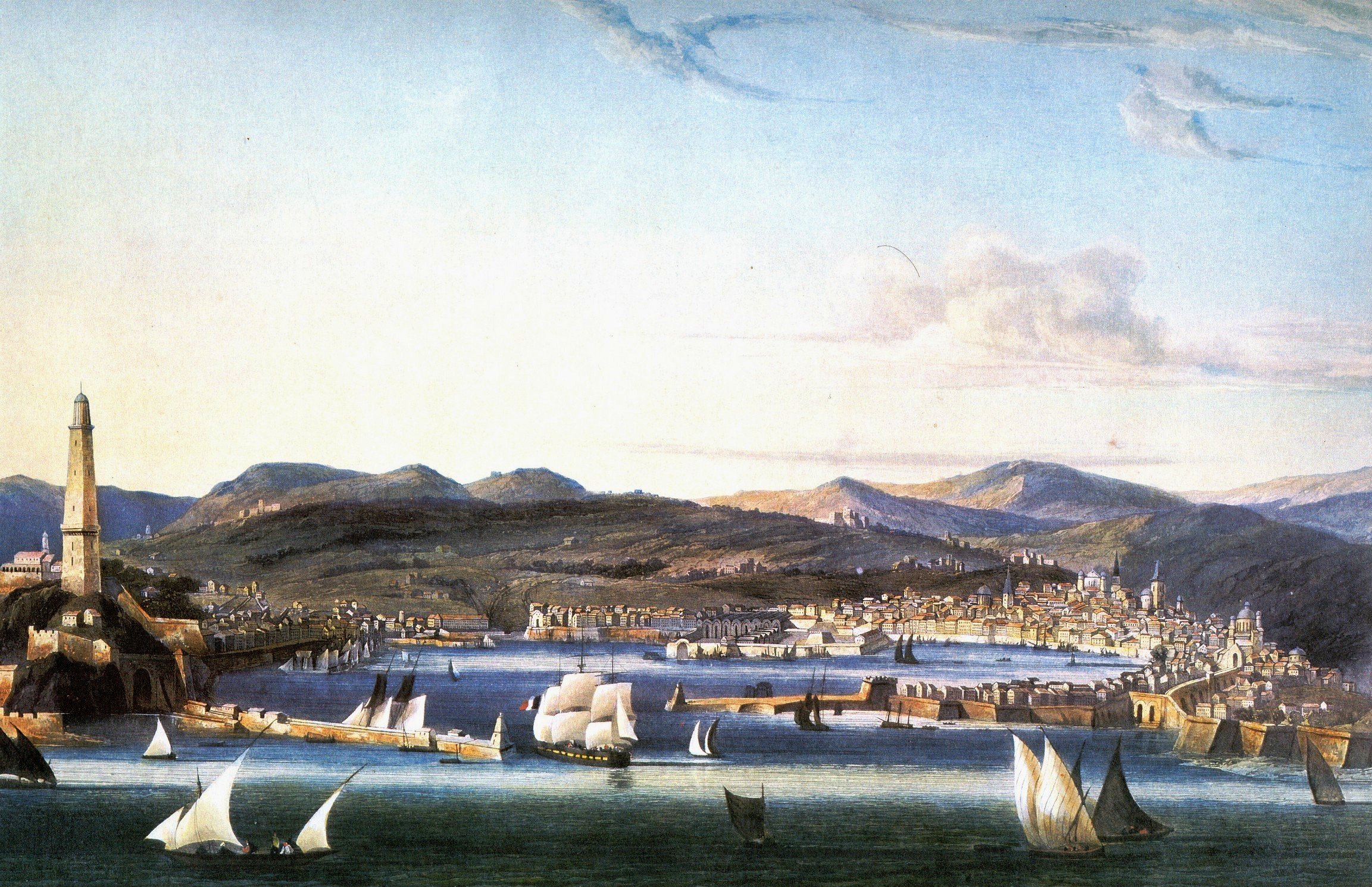
- The area of the Old Port of Genoa in an aquatint by Ambroise Louis Garneray from around 1810. In the foreground, sailing ships can be seen entering and exiting the basin. On the left is the Lanterna, and on the right, the ancient city walls.
- Interactive map of Porto Antico di Genova (Old Harbour of Genoa)

Location
- Country: Italy

Details
- Type of Harbor: Residential, tourist, and cultural center

The Porto Antico (Italian for Old Harbour) is the historic port area of Genoa, Italy. After a period of disuse, the area was redeveloped in 1992 and transformed into a hub for tourism, culture, and public services.

Today, the Porto Antico consists of a series of interconnected quays that form a waterfront promenade covering over 230,000 square meters. It is home to numerous attractions, including:

- The Aquarium of Genoa
- The Galata Museo del Mare
- The Biosphere, a glass and steel spherical structure
- The Bigo, a panoramic lift with a design inspired by shipyard cranes

The management of the area is divided into sections. Two are operated under state concession by the companies Porto Antico di Genova S.p.A. and Marina Porto Antico S.p.A., while a third section is managed directly by the Municipality of Genoa.

== Description ==
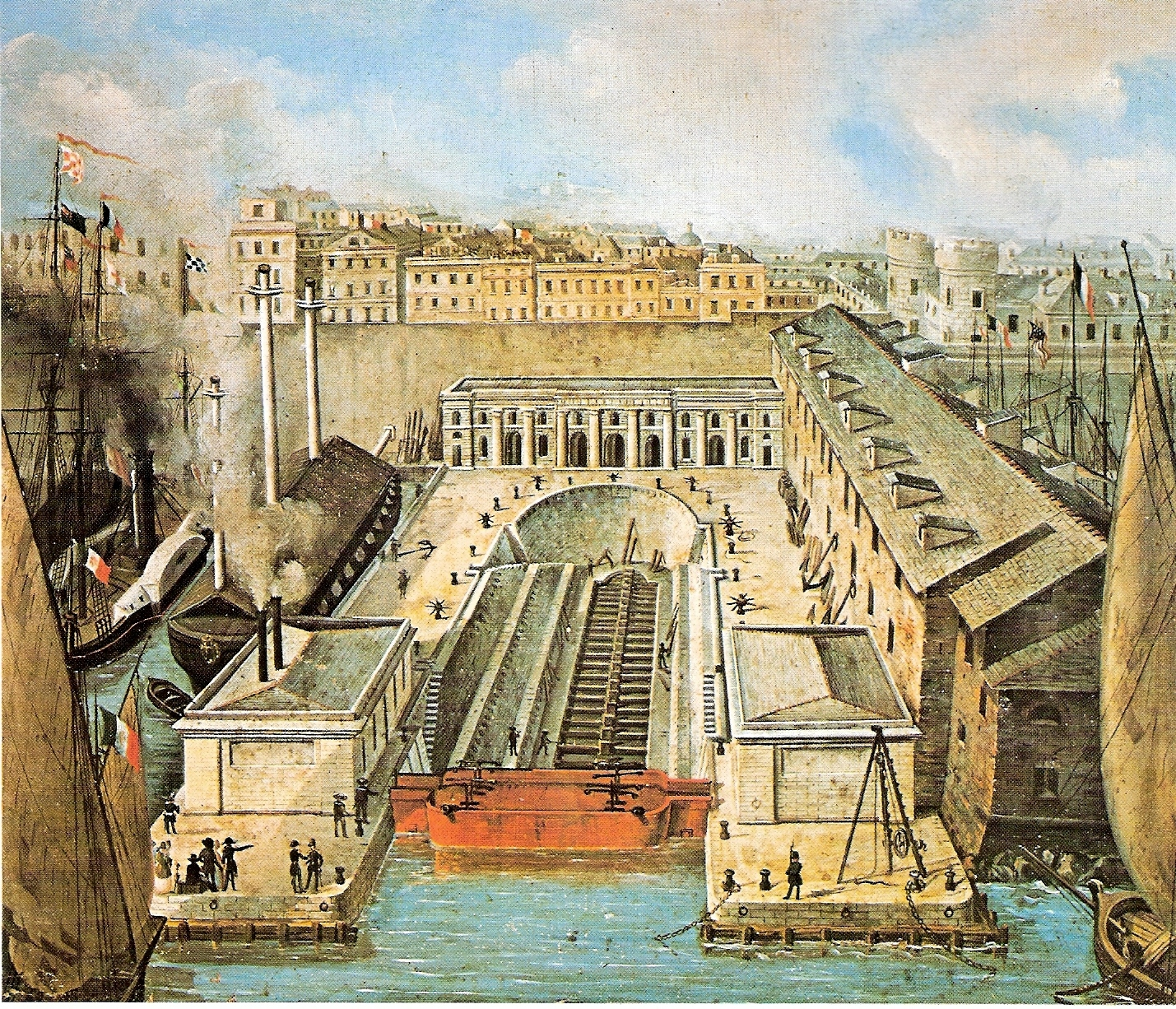
The Darsena dry dock in the port of Genoa. It opened in 1851 based on a design by Damiano Sauli.

The area, often called the "Expo" because it hosted the Genoa Expo '92, stretches from Piazza Cavour to Ponte Parodi. Inland, it is bordered by the Aldo Moro elevated highway.

The entire area was completely redeveloped in 1992 based on a design by architect Renzo Piano. The project was part of the city's celebration of the 500th anniversary of the discovery of America. A dedicated company, Porto Antico di Genova S.p.A., was established to manage the area. The company, a public-private partnership controlled by the Municipality of Genoa, oversees what is considered Genoa's new waterfront for the 21st century. In 2019, Porto Antico di Genova S.p.A. merged with Fiera di Genova S.p.A.

In recent years, the Porto Antico has become a major hub for tourist, musical, cultural, and sporting events. It served as the starting point for The Tall Ships' Races in 2007 and 2010. It also hosted the MTV Days music festival in 2008 and 2009, and the TRL Awards in 2010, another event produced by MTV Italia. Every year, the area is also home to two popular events: the Festa dello Sport (Sports Festival) in the spring, and Porto Antico EstateSpettacolo, a summer music, theater, and dance festival held at the scenic Arena del Mare plaza.

A tourist information office, now part of the city's IAT network, has long been located in the area to welcome and provide information to the many visitors. The Porto Antico is one of Genoa's main attractions.

In 2017, Piano donated the design for the Waterfront di Levante (Eastern Waterfront) to the Municipality of Genoa. Conceived as a natural eastward expansion that completes the Porto Antico project, work began on this new phase in 2019.

=== Presidents ===
- Renato Picco (1995–2006)
- Pier Luigi Assirelli (2006)
- Giuseppe Pericu (2006–2007)
- Bruno Giontoni (2007–2009)
- Ariel Dello Strologo (2009–2017)
- Giorgio Mosci (2017–2019)
- Luca Nannini (2019)
- Mauro Ferrando (since 2019)

== Structures and Places ==
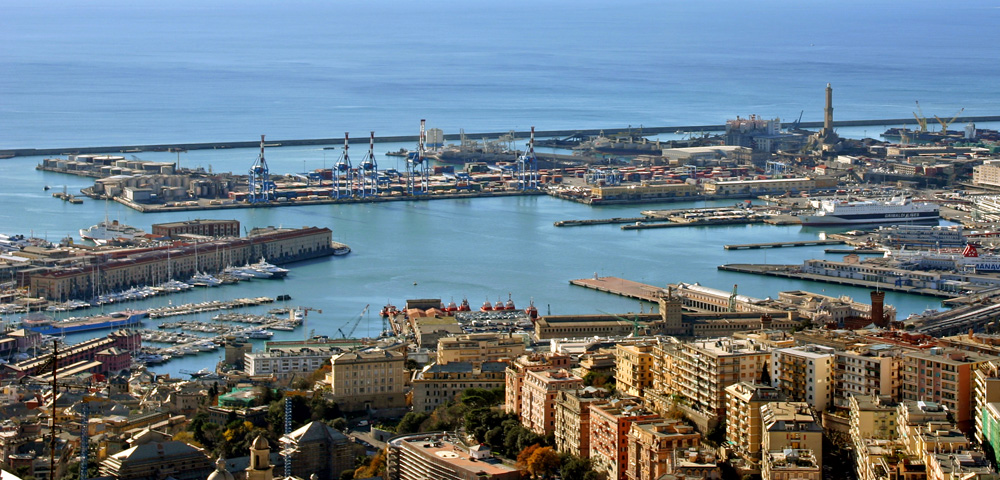
Aerial panorama of the Harbour

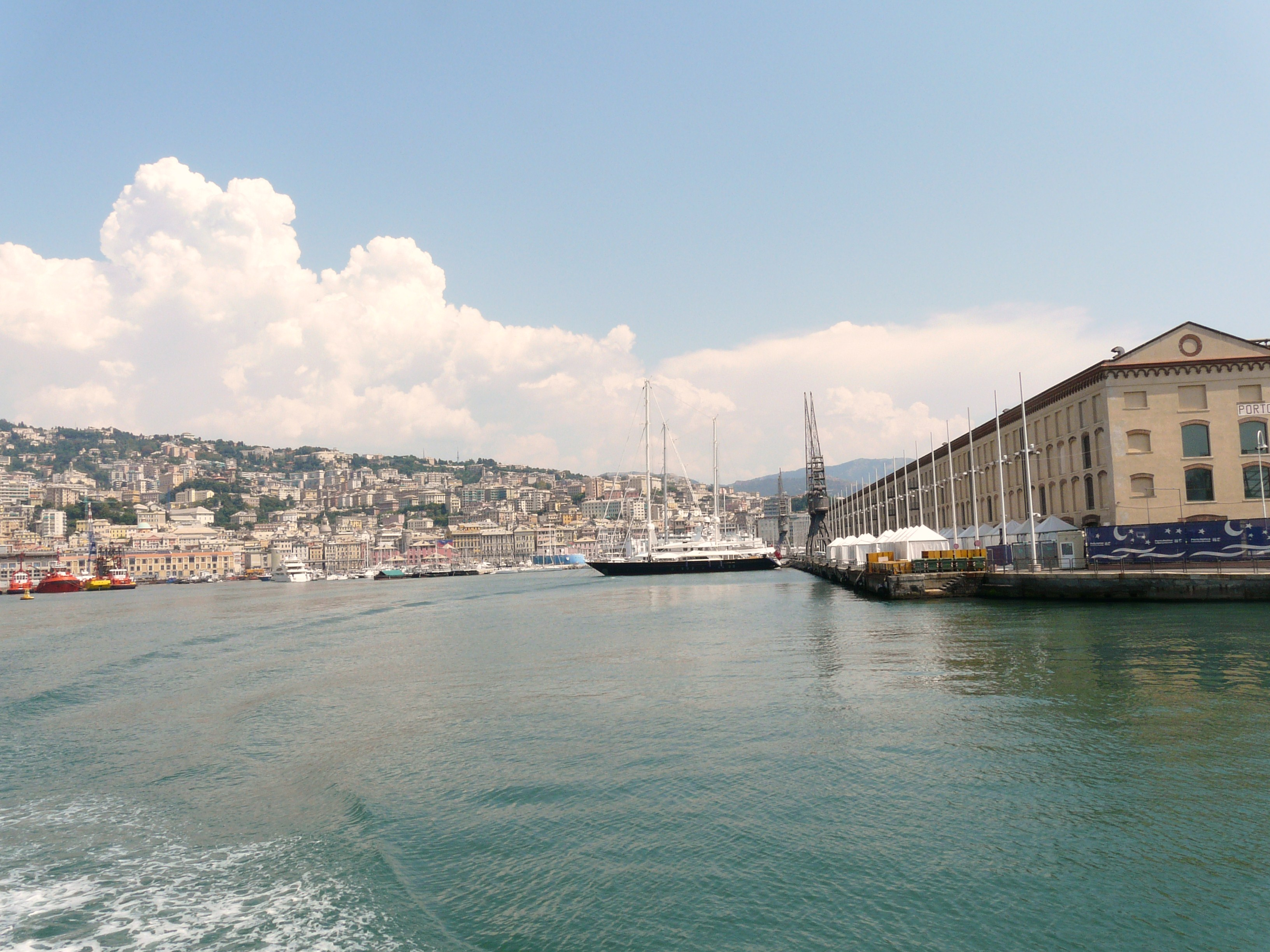
The entrance

The district contains numerous buildings of artistic and cultural interest, including several 17th-century palazzine representing Genoese Baroque and late-Renaissance architecture. Many of these were demolished in the 1960s during the construction of the Sopraelevata Aldo Moro, an elevated highway extending for about six kilometers along the port area from Sampierdarena to Foce. Although the project improved urban traffic, it significantly altered the historic waterfront. In recent years, restoration and redevelopment initiatives have aimed to preserve the remaining architectural heritage and integrate it with modern infrastructure.

The main structures present are:

=== Area managed by Porto Antico di Genova S.p.A. ===
Submarine S 518 Nazario Sauro.

- Genoa Aquarium (Ponte Spinola), The City of Children and Young People, Bigo panoramic lift, and the Biosphere, managed by Costa Edutainment S.p.A.
- Mandraccio play area.
- Edmondo De Amicis Library (Cotton Warehouses): one of the first in Europe dedicated to young people from 0 to 18 years old.
- Nave Blu (Ponte Spinola): Originally named Nave Italia, this hull was built for Expo '92 and is now an extension of the Genoa Aquarium, to which it is internally connected. It contains tanks and reproductions of natural environments.
- IAT Tourist Information and Welcome Office, located at the green hub in front of the aquarium ticket offices.
- Genoa Store.
- Tourist boat docks.
- The City of Children and Young People: the largest permanent space in Italy for children and young people aged 2 to 14 for the diffusion of science and technology through stimulating learning methods.
- Piazza delle Feste (Festival Square).
- Porto Antico Swimming Pool (open from June to September).
- The Space Cinema multiplex.
- Various commercial establishments.
- Various restaurants, bars, ice cream parlors, and nightlife venues.
- Marina Molo Vecchio berths.

=== Area managed by Marina Porto Antico S.p.A. ===
- Marina Porto Antico berths.
- Neptune
- NH Marina Hotel
- Various commercial establishments
- Various restaurants, bars, and ice cream parlors

=== Areas managed by the Municipality of Genoa ===
- Genoa Port authority (Palazzo San Giorgio)
- Dry dock
- Fishing boat moorings
- Faculty of Economics of the University of Genoa
- San Giorgio State Nautical Technical Institute

=== The Aquarium ===
The Acquarium of Genoa is a large and renowned living museum that houses approximately 6,000 specimens representing around 600 different marine species, including fish, marine mammals, crustaceans, reptiles, and aquatic plants. Located on the Ponte Spinola in the Porto Antico area of Genoa, it is one of Europe’s major aquariums. With about 10,000 m² of exhibition space and dozens of tanks recreating environments from the Mediterranean to tropical seas and polar waters, it hosts around 600 different species (and up to 12,000 specimens, depending on counting) and emphasizes marine biodiversity, education and conservation.

The large Cetacean Pavilion, inaugurated in 2013, allows visitors to observe dolphins from multiple perspectives through four large open tanks, both above and below the water surface. The pavilion also includes a section dedicated to the Pelagos Sanctuary, the largest marine protected area in the Mediterranean, with opportunities for educational excursions organized in collaboration with Whale Watch Genoa.

=== The Biosphere ===
The biosphere of Genoa is a glass and steel sphere located in the sea next to the aquarium, hosting butterflies, iguanas, ferns, and various species of tropical plants that thrive thanks to an automated system of blinds on the inner walls, which allow the right amount of solar heat to penetrate from the outside.

Designed by architect Renzo Piano, the structure was constructed in 2001, initially for the G8 summit held in the city. The sphere is suspended over the sea at Ponte Spinola, positioned immediately adjacent to the Aquarium of Genoa.

Functioning as a greenhouse, the Biosfera recreates a complex micro-climate, housing a small tropical rainforest ecosystem with over 150 species of plants and animals, including tree ferns, palms, and various birds, turtles, and fish.

=== The Bigo ===
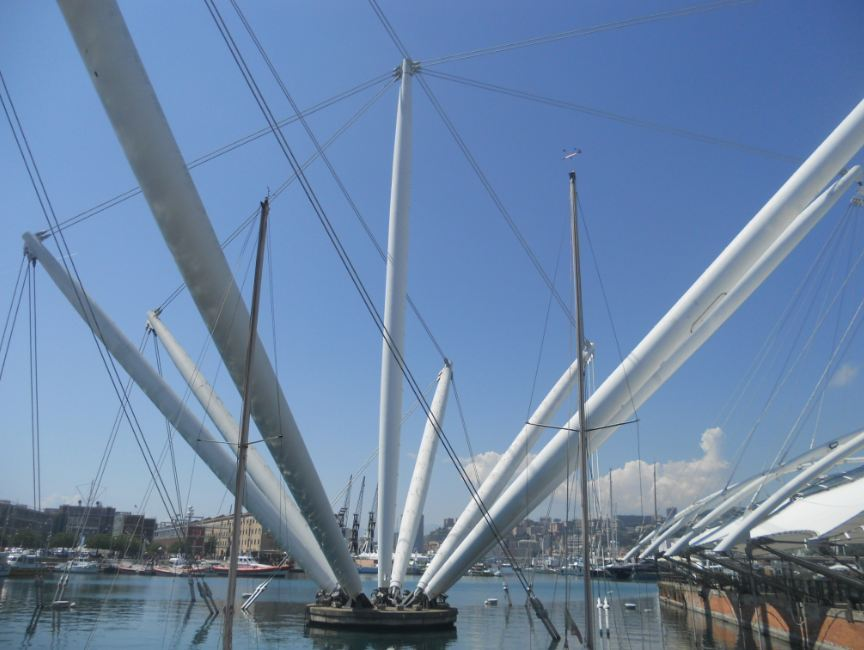
The Bigo

The Bigo is a modern metal monument designed by Renzo Piano for Expo '92 Genoa. It replicates, on a large scale, a large loading crane like those mounted on ships. It is a design experiment created as a scenic element for the old port. Its base is in the water. Its structure supports a large, circular, rotating panoramic elevator that offers a 360° view of the port area from a height of about 40 meters, with departures from the ground every 10 minutes. Next to the Bigo are the Columbus' Wind sculptures, designed by the Japanese artist Susumu Shingu.

=== Porta Siberia ===
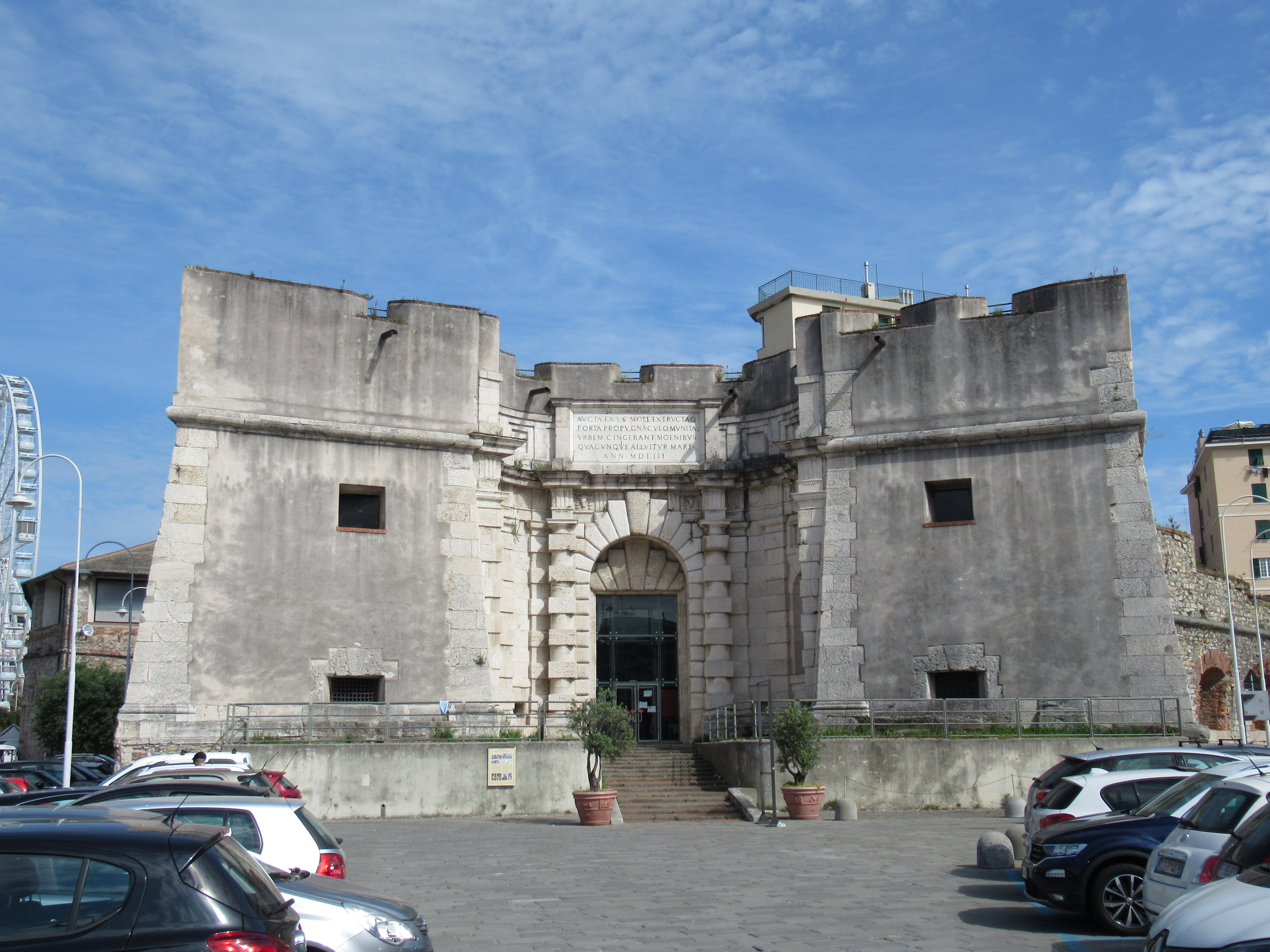
Porta Siberia

This gate was part of the 16th-century walls built between 1551 and 1553 by Galeazzo Alessi. It was the access point to the Molo Vecchio (Old Pier), built as an extension of the Mandraccio, the peninsula once used as a natural harbor. Its historically documented name is Porta del Molo, while the name commonly used today is borrowed from an adjacent, more recent gate, which has given its name to the entire complex.

The term "Siberia" is believed to derive from cibaria (foodstuffs), as food supplies arriving by sea and those departing for other Mediterranean ports passed through this gate. It was formerly a place for collecting customs duties. After the redevelopment of the old port, in 2001, a museum dedicated to the painter and set designer Emanuele Luzzati was opened inside, featuring temporary exhibitions by the Genoese artist and major contemporary illustrators. Part of the museum has since been moved to Palazzo Ducale. Today, Porta Siberia hosts temporary exhibitions.

=== Cotton Warehouses ===
The Cotton Warehouses (Italian: Magazzini del Cotone) are a historic landmark in the Porto Antico (Old Port) of Genoa, Italy. Originally built at the turn of the 20th century, they were designed as general warehouses to serve the city's bustling maritime trade.

A product of British engineering and Genoese construction, the warehouses were designed in a functionalist style, with a striking exposed iron and steel framework. The first building on the northern side was completed in 1901. Initially known as the Magazzini Generali Genovesi – Molo Vecchio Genova, the complex was used to store all kinds of goods awaiting shipment.

The complex earned its current name in 1926, when a second building was added to the south, specifically for storing cotton. After sustaining damage during World War II, the warehouses were repaired and repurposed exclusively for cotton storage in the post-war era.

The warehouses underwent a major transformation in 1992 as part of a large-scale redevelopment of the entire Old Port. The project was led by renowned Genoese architect Renzo Piano for the celebrations of the Columbian Exposition. Piano repurposed the historic industrial buildings into a modern, multipurpose center. Today, the Cotton Warehouses are a vibrant part of Genoese life, housing the Porto Antico Conference Center, along with exhibition spaces, shops, restaurants, bars, and a multiplex cinema.

=== Millo Building ===
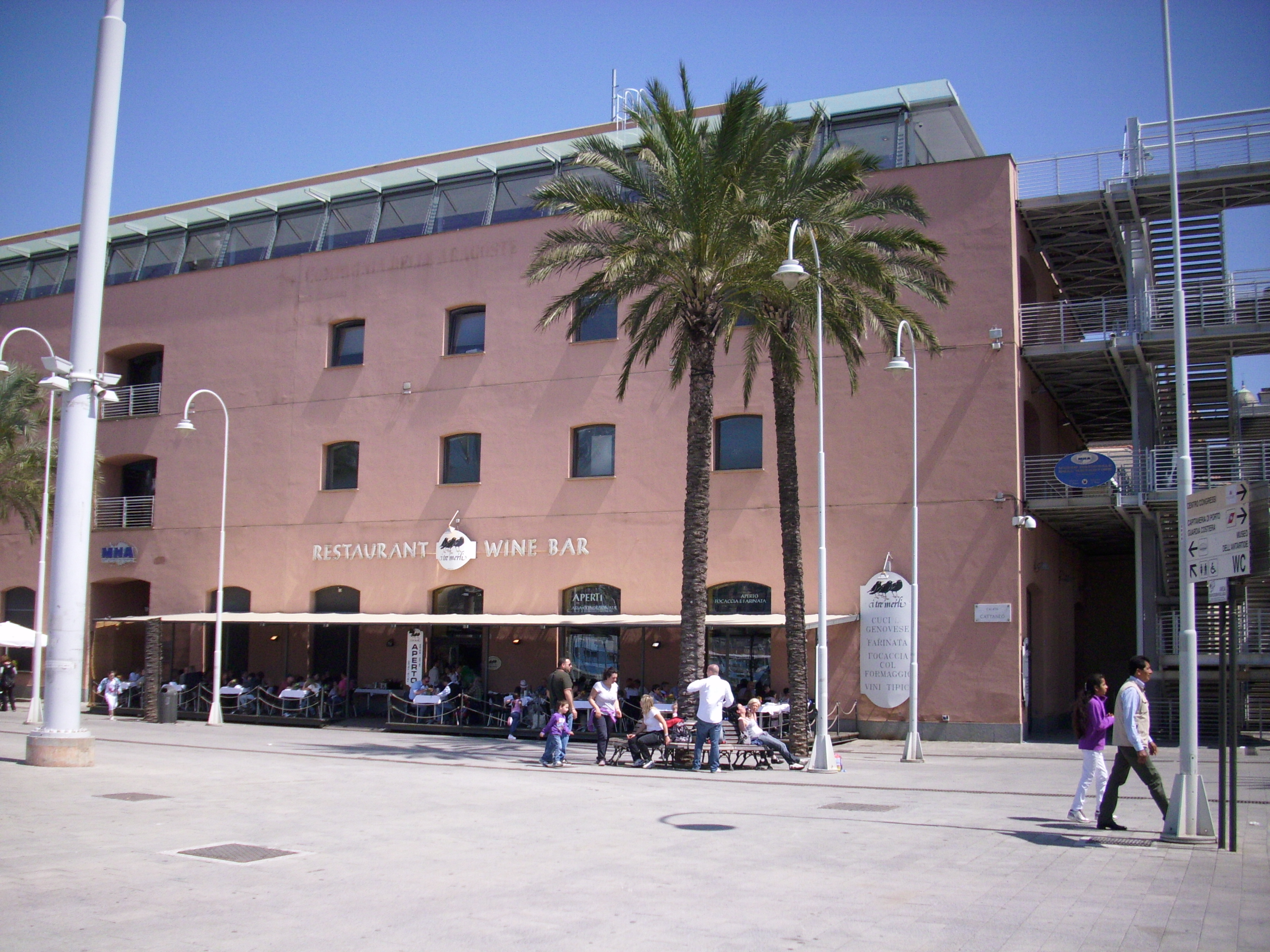
The portion of the Millo Building where the National Antarctic Museum was located on the first floor.

Built in 1876, it now houses restaurants, bars, shops, and the Genoa branch of Eataly.

=== 17th-Century Buildings ===
Next to the Millo are four restored small palaces dating back to the 17th century. They were part of a complex of buildings, progressively demolished in the 20th century, that, together with the Millo, formed the "Portofranco" (Free Port).

=== Piazza delle Feste ===
This is the largest space on the pier in front of the Millo building. A versatile and multi-functional tensile structure, it can host various events (musical, cultural, commercial, and sporting) from April to October. During the winter, it becomes an ice-skating rink. Since 2015, it has been the main venue for the Supernova Festival Genova music festival.

=== Mandraccio ===
The Mandraccio is an area within Genoa's Porto Antico (Old Port), known as a hub for recreation and public art. The main quay is the departure point for whale-watching excursions into the Pelagos Sanctuary for Mediterranean Marine Mammals, as well as for ferries to scenic destinations along the Riviera di Levante. The square in front of the building features an inclusive playground, designed for children with and without disabilities to play together. The area is also home to several notable landmarks. A large, cylindrical art installation called The Cord has been a permanent feature since 2003. Originally part of the Venice Biennale, the 200-meter-long structure was initially planned as a temporary exhibit but remained in Genoa. In 2018, its exterior was temporarily decorated in the style of Vincent van Gogh's painting The Starry Night for a special exhibition. Nearby stands a statue of Mahatma Gandhi, which was installed in 2006.

=== Vascello Neptune, Darsena, and Galata – Museo del mare ===
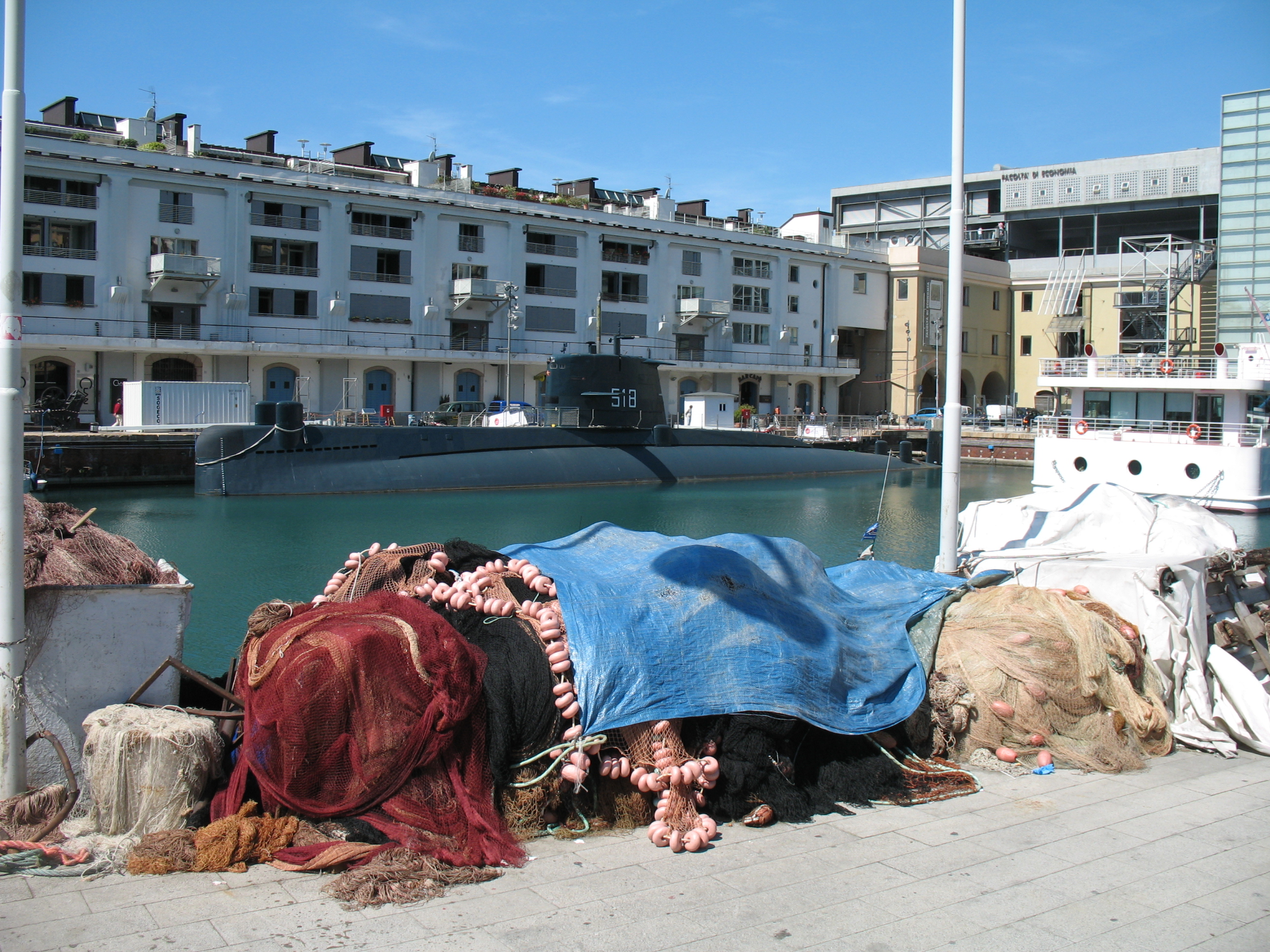
The Darsena with the submarine Nazario Sauro

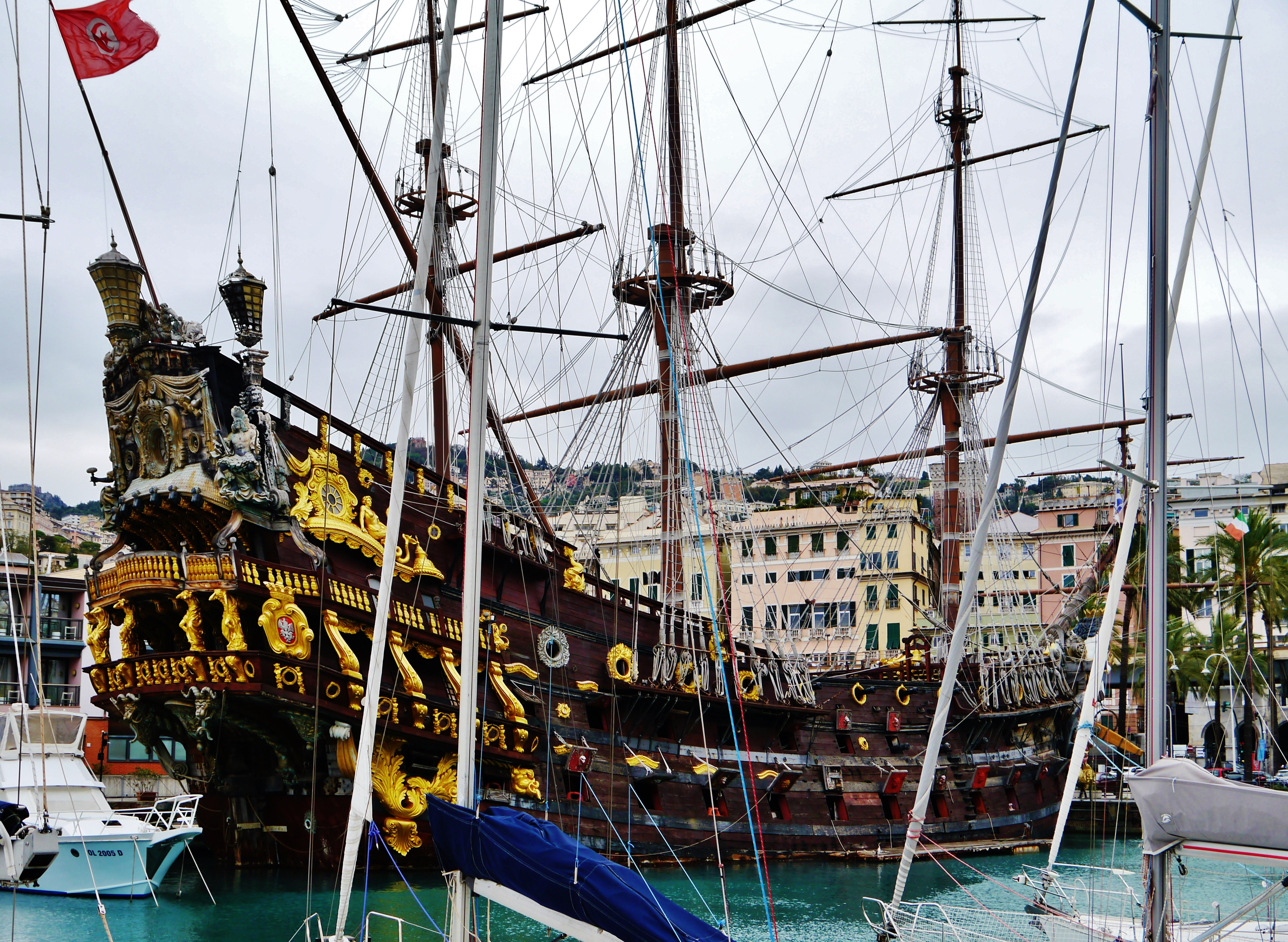
Part of the Neptune's side

The Darsena (dockyard) effectively closes the western end of the old port. It hosts dry docks and small fishing boats. Adjacent to the Galata - Museo del mare and the building housing the Faculty of Economics is the museum submarine Nazario Sauro (S 518).

The Neptune is a full-scale, seaworthy (its maximum speed is 5 knots) replica of an old pirate galleon, built as the main set for Roman Polanski's 1986 film Pirates. The ship is now open to the public and is moored next to the aquarium.

=== Arena del Mare ===
The Arena del Mare (Arena of the Sea) is an open-air venue located at the end of the Magazzini del Cotone pier in the Porto Antico of Genoa. During the summer, it transforms into a spectacular "square on the sea," hosting concerts, theatrical shows, and other cultural events.

Performances are set against a unique backdrop of Genoa's illuminated skyline, the iconic Lanterna lighthouse, and passing ships. The arena is the main stage for the Porto Antico EstateSpettacolo, one of the city's most popular summer festivals, featuring a mix of music, theater, and dance. The venue's capacity is flexible, holding up to 5,250 spectators for large concerts or providing a more intimate arrangement with 1,260 seats for events like opera and ballet.

=== Sea Link via Navebus service ===
A ferry service, managed by AMT Genova, connects the old port area with the seaside promenade of the Pegli district.

=== The Old Port in Figures (2007 data) ===
In 2007, the structures in the old port managed by the Costa Edutainment company recorded a total of 1,670,000 visitors (for a turnover of nearly 24 million euro), with results in line with those achieved during Genoa European Capital of Culture 2004. These are the figures for the number of visitors to the main attractions, as reported by the Genoese newspaper Il Secolo XIX

| Attraction | No. of visitors |
|---|---|
| Galata - Museo del mare | 130,000 (of which 75,000 paying) |
| Aquarium | 1,330,000 |
| Biosphere | 60,000 |
| Bigo | 77,000 |
| Città dei bambini (City of Children) | 120,000 |

In 2011, attendance in the Porto Antico area was estimated at approximately 4,070,000, broken down as follows:

| Activity | No. of visitors |
|---|---|
| Genoa Aquarium | 1,110,000 |
| Recreational/Cultural Spaces | 580,000 |
| Congress Activities | 108,000 |
| Events and Shows | 432,000 |
| Commercial, relaxation, and leisure activities | 1,800,000 |
| Recreational Boating | 40,000 |

== Image gallery ==
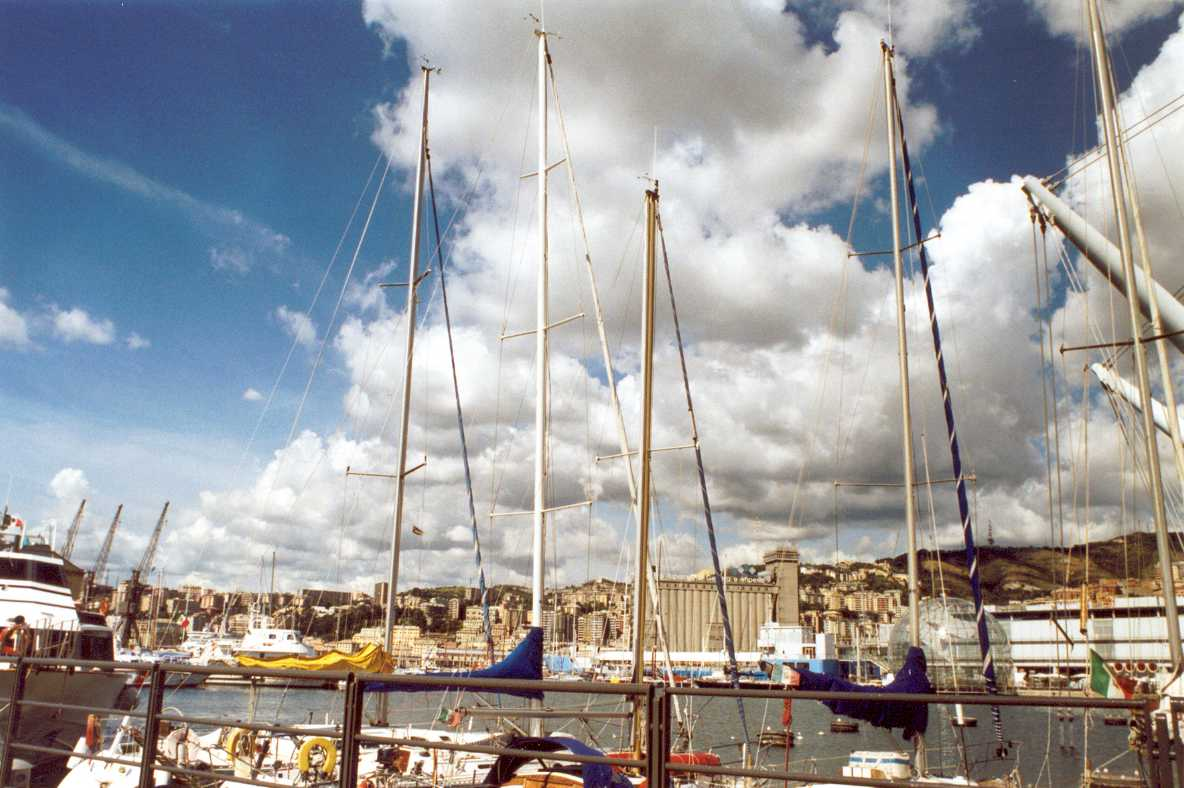
The Old Port

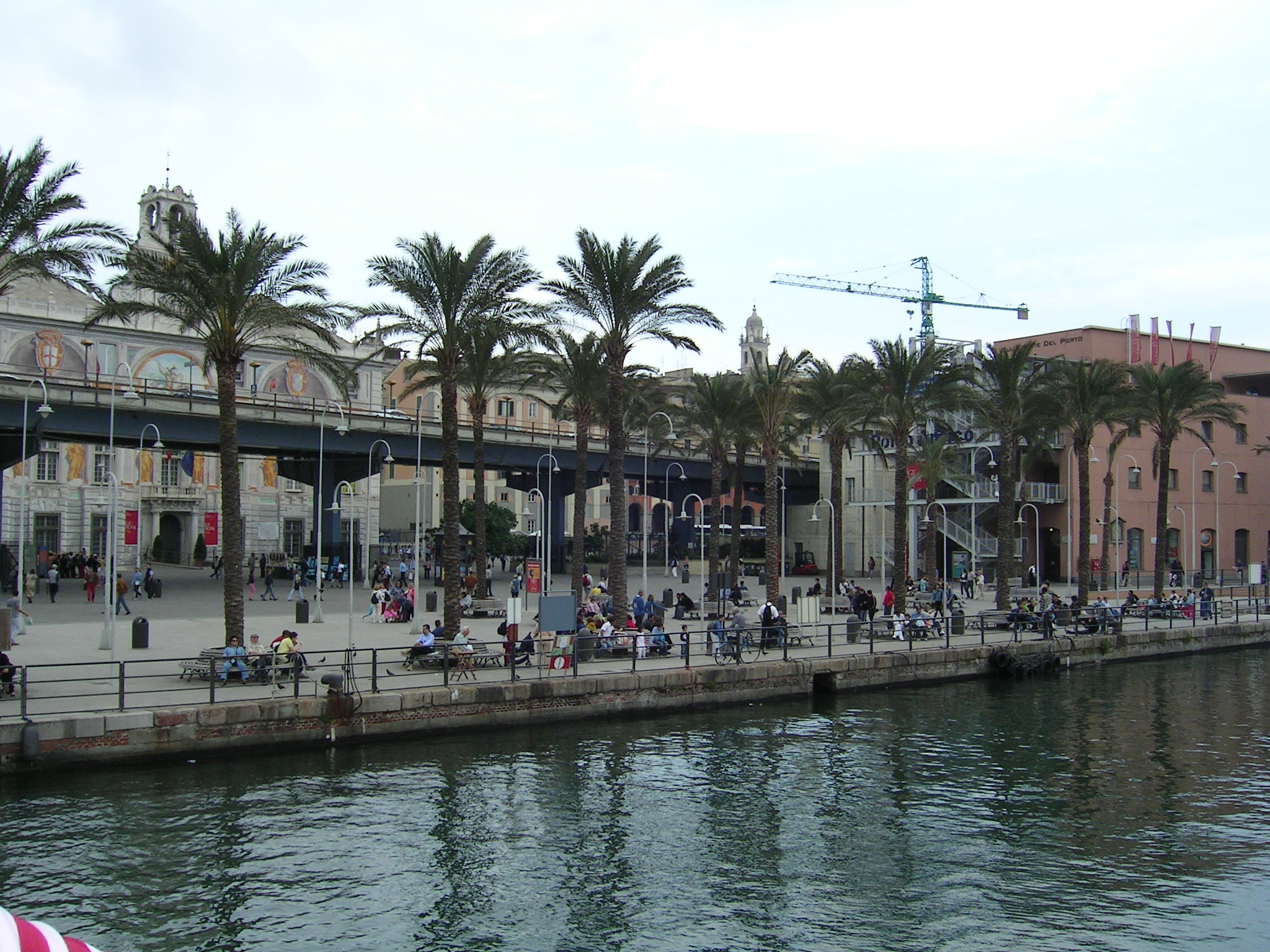
Walkway alongside the Palazzina Millo

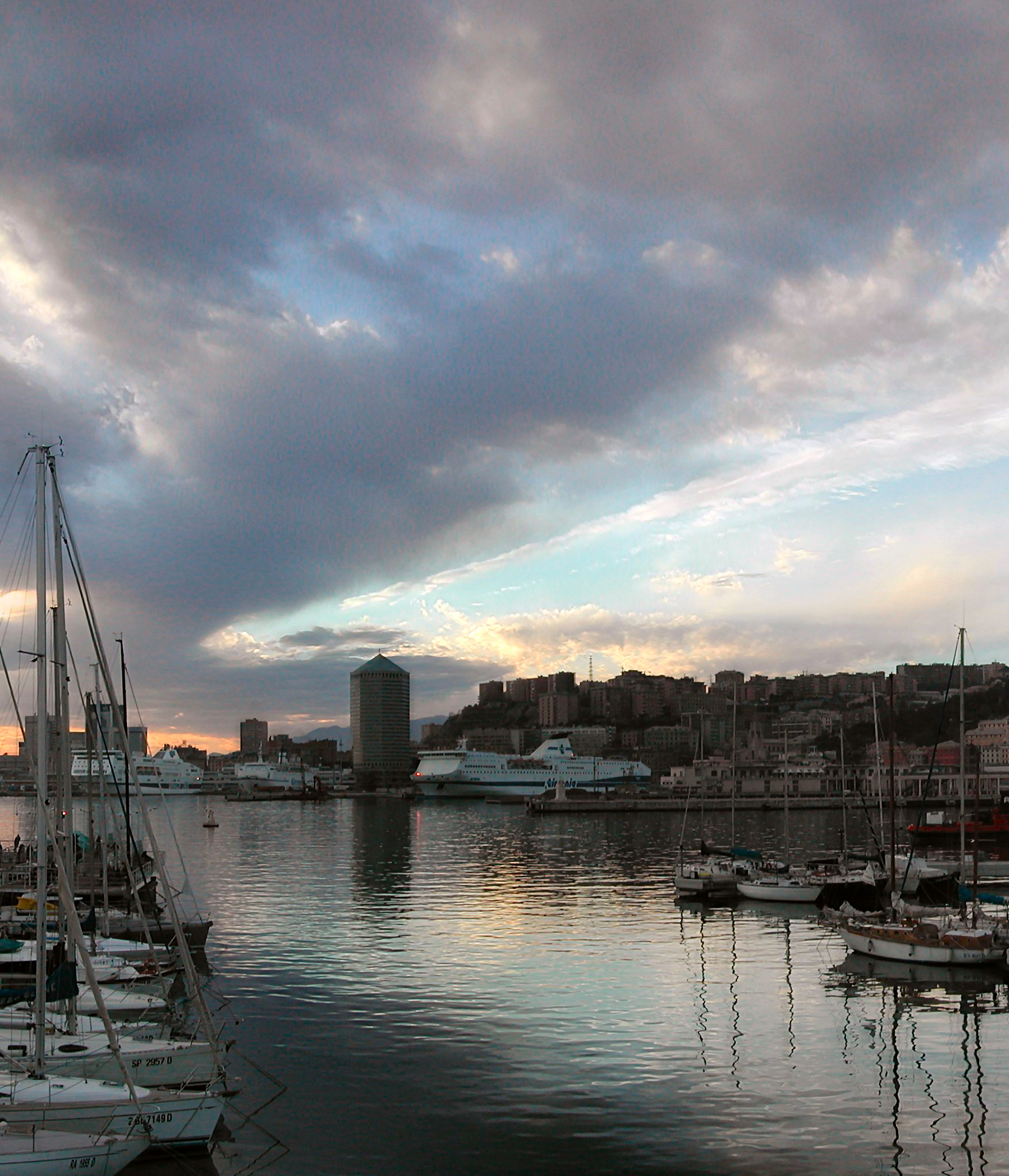
View of the port from the Aquarium

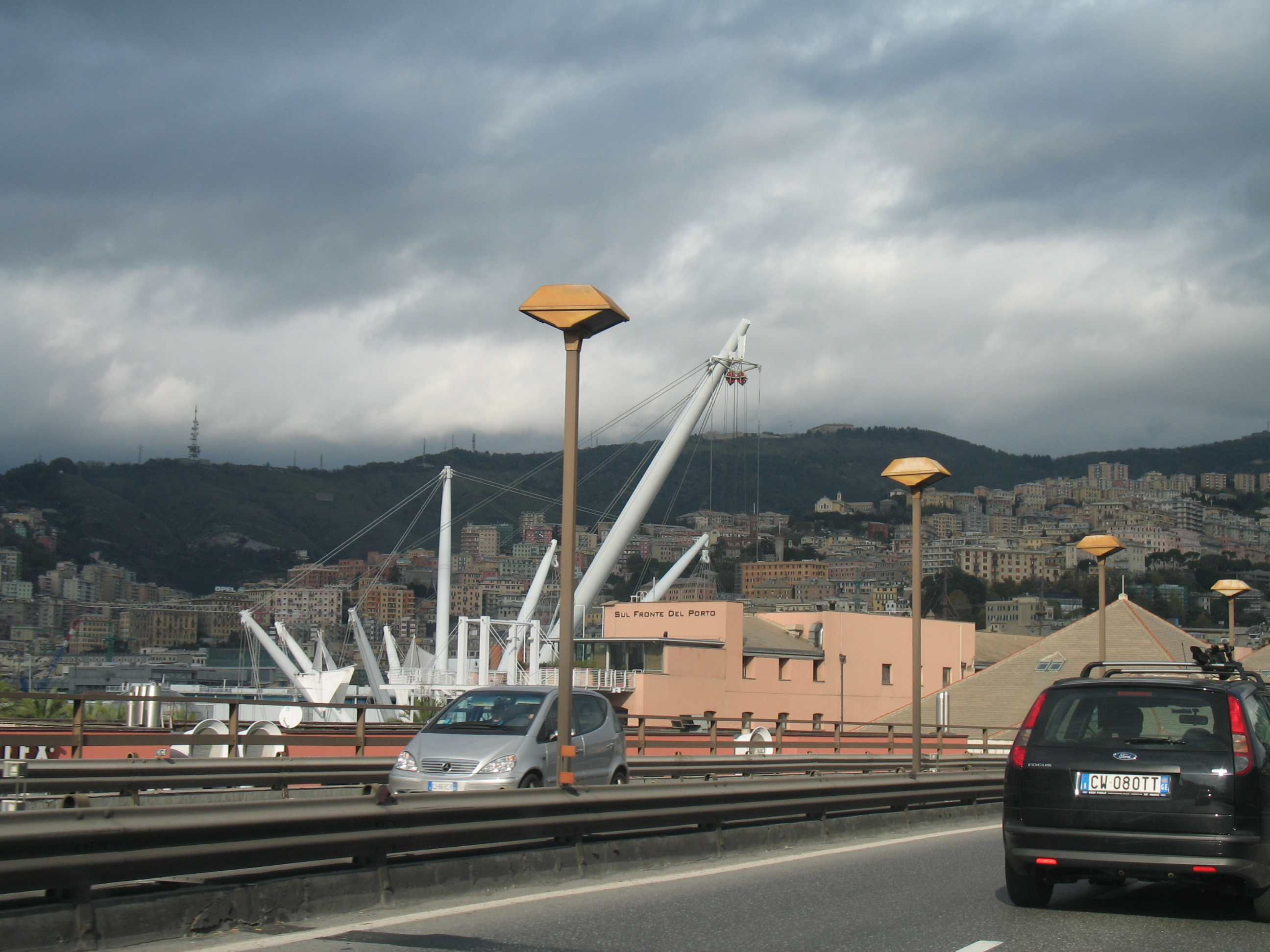
The Old Port seen from the Sopraelevata Aldo Moro

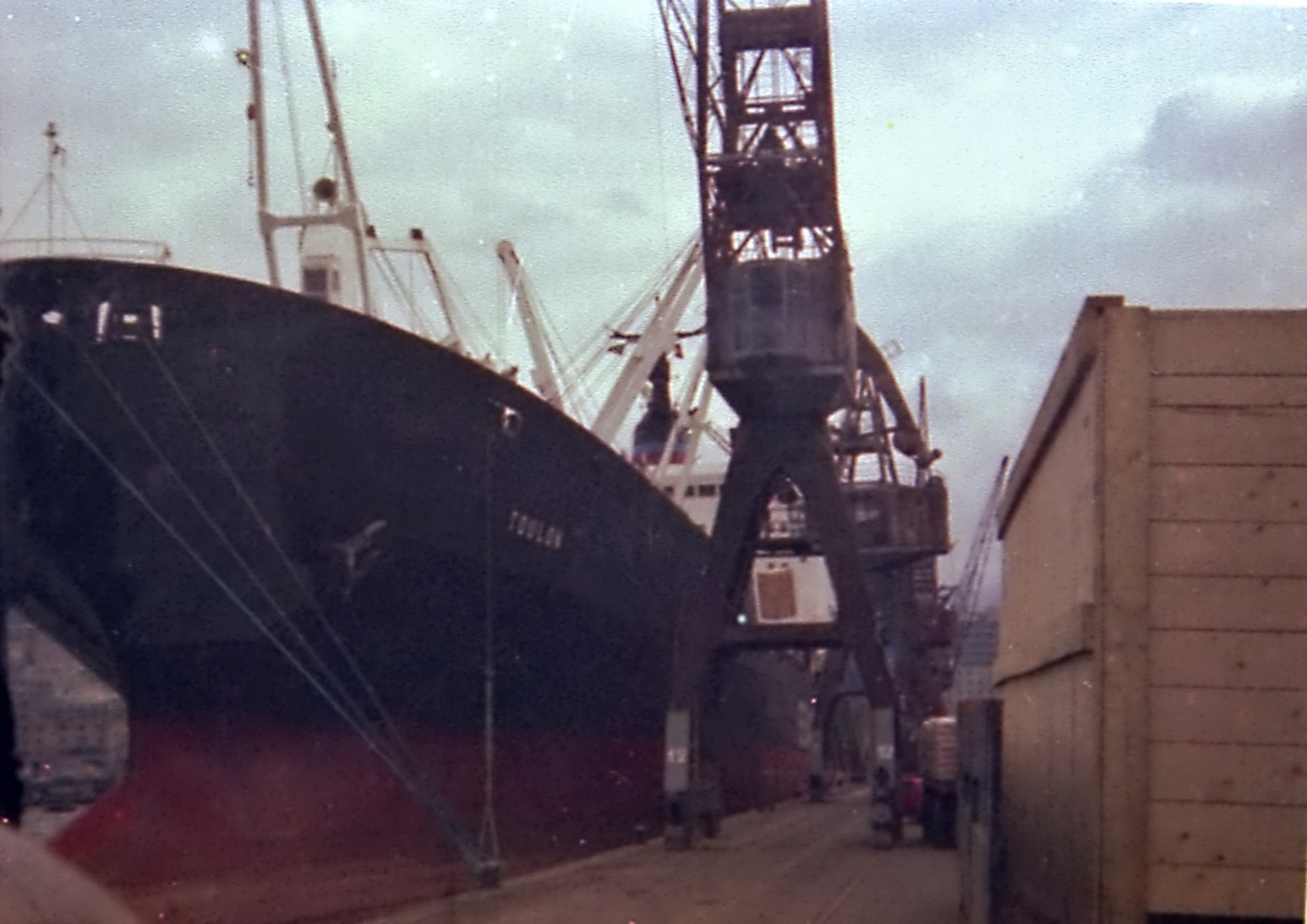
The quay next to the Cotton Warehouses, still used for loading and unloading goods in the mid-1980s

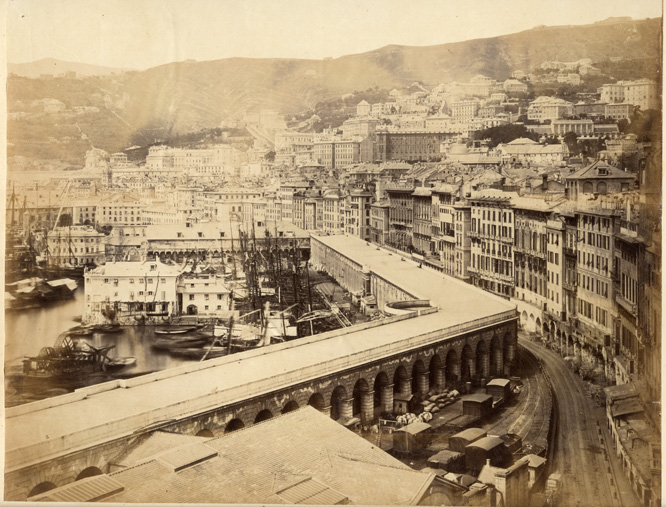
The historic port of Genoa, with the Terrazze di marmo, in a photograph (c. 1880) by Alfred Noack
