= Waterfront di Levante =

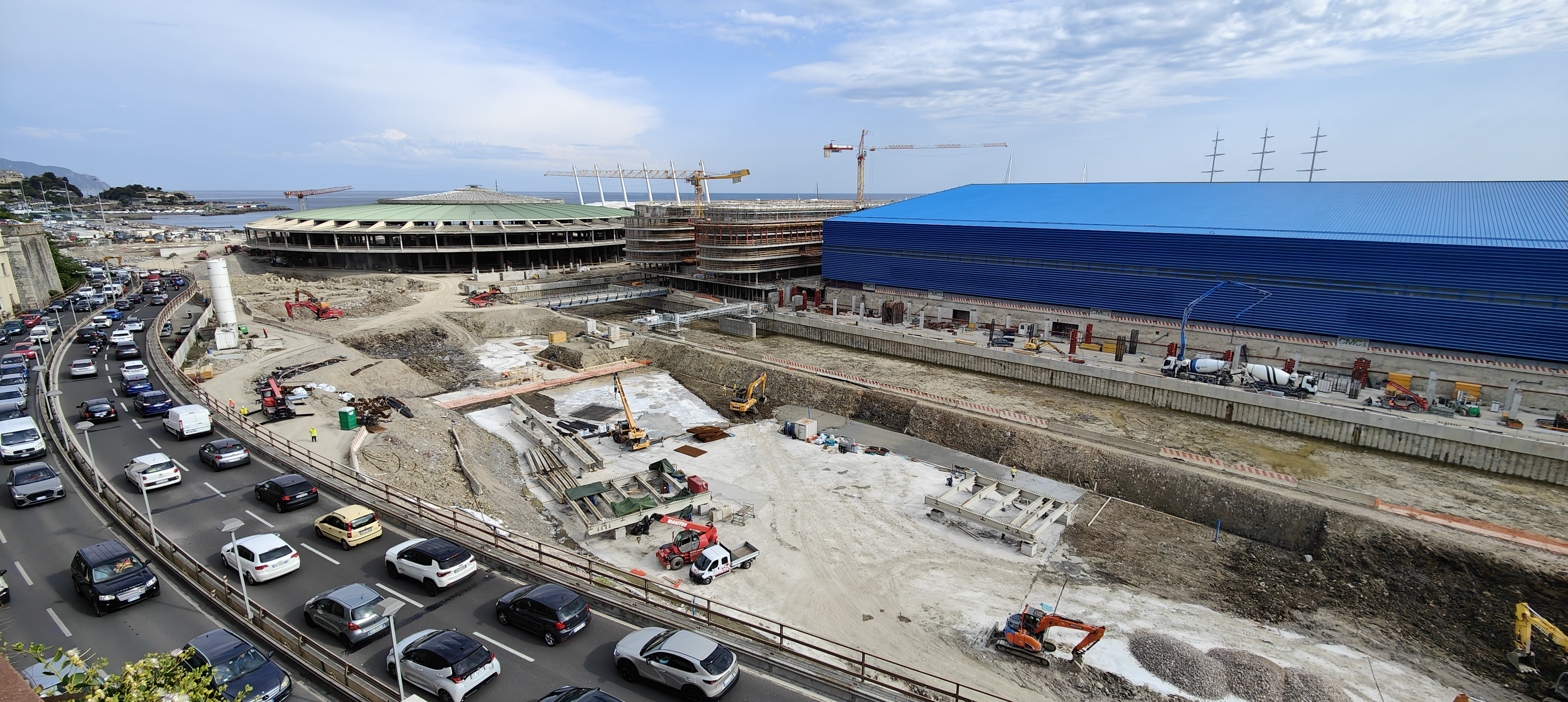
- Waterfront di Levante in 2023
- Interactive map of Waterfront di Levante
- Location: Genoa, Italy
- Coordinates: 44°23′48.11″N 8°56′21.91″E

Waterfront di Levante is an area of Genoa at the center of a large urban regeneration project aimed at transforming the city's eastern shoreline. The project seeks to enhance former exhibition and port areas by creating a new urban hub through the introduction of residential functions, offices, commercial spaces, and public areas, thereby giving the city a renewed seafront access.

== History ==
The area involved in the project was created in the early 1960s through a major land reclamation intervention that filled in the former beach located along the coast between the Carignano and Foce districts.

The new project stems from the urban vision of Genoese architect Renzo Piano, formalized in a masterplan donated on October 31, 2017, to the Municipality of Genoa, the Liguria Region, and the Western Ligurian Sea Port Authority, with the aim of returning the sea to the city. This vision is part of a broader strategy to reactivate the relationship between the city and the sea, initiated decades earlier with the redevelopment of the Old Harbour.

In the following years, the area was progressively transformed through demolitions, excavations for new canals, and other preliminary works. During 2019, the former NIRA building was demolished, while in 2020 the old Fiera di Genova ticket offices were torn down; in 2021, pavilions C and D were also demolished. In August 2020, the first section of the newly created canals were filled in with water.
