= Bigo (Genoa) =

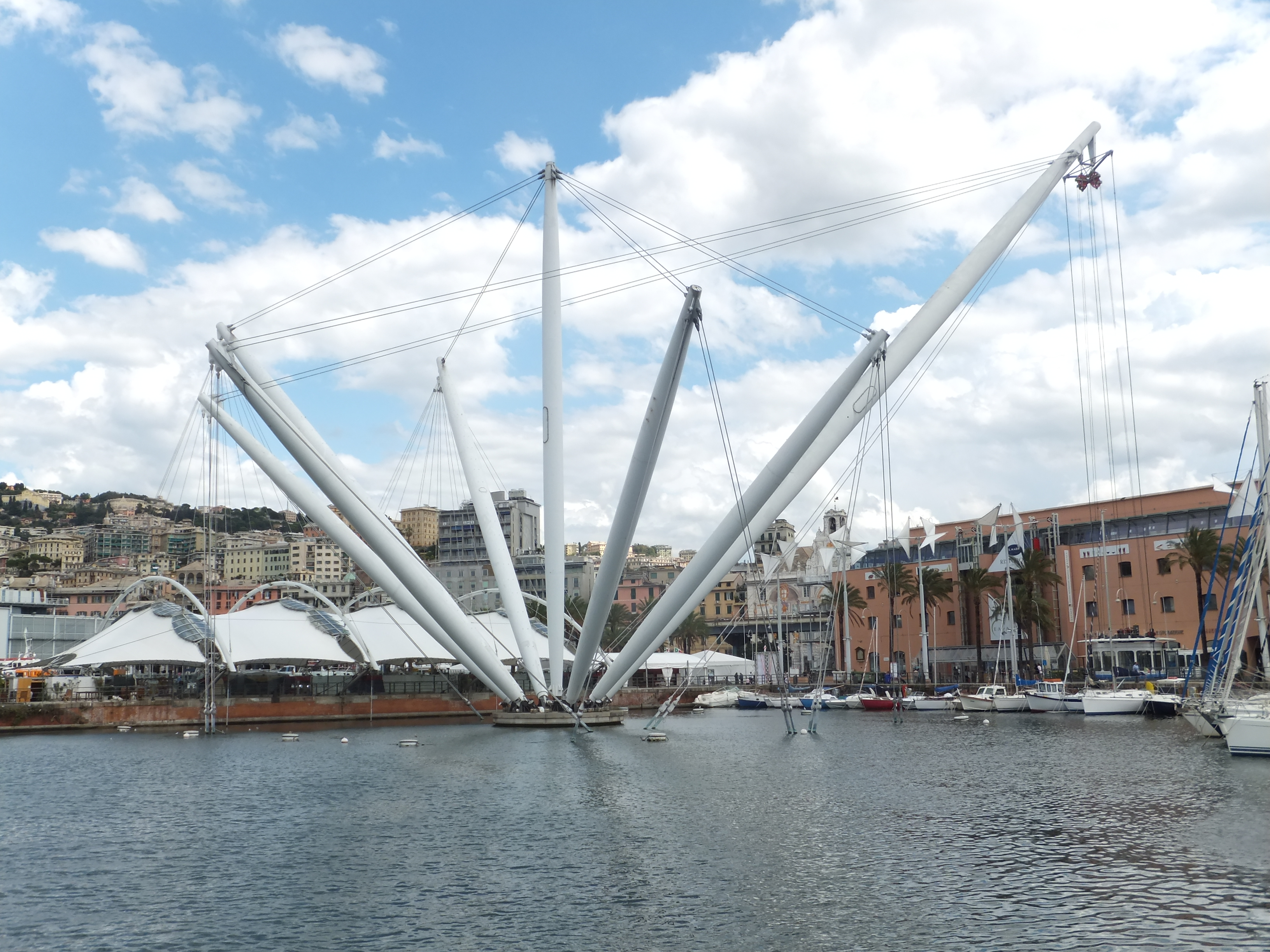
- The Bigo in the Old Port of Genoa
- Interactive map of the Bigo area

General information
- Status: In use
- Type: Panoramic elevator and structural centerpiece
- Architectural style: Contemporary architecture
- Location: Old Port of Genoa area, Calata Cattaneo, Genoa, Italy
- Opening: 1992
- Client: Municipality of Genoa
- Management: Porto Antico di Genova S.p.A.

Design and construction
- Architect: Renzo Piano
- Structural engineer: Ove Arup & Partners (Peter Rice)

The Bigo is an architectural structure located in the Old Port of Genoa, designed by architect Renzo Piano. Built for the Genoa Expo '92 (also known as "Colombiadi," the Columbus Celebrations), it has become one of the main symbols of the urban redevelopment of the Ligurian capital.

Inspired in both its form and name by the bighi (traditional ship-loading cranes), the structure serves a dual purpose: it houses a rotating panoramic elevator offering a 360° view of the city and simultaneously acts as the support structure for the canopy of the underlying Piazza delle Feste (Festival Square). Due to its symbolic value, the Bigo is featured in the official logo of the Old Port of Genoa.

== History and project ==
Created as part of the broader redevelopment project of the Old Port, entrusted to Renzo Piano for the celebrations of the 500th anniversary of the discovery of America, the Bigo was inaugurated on May 15, 1992, to coincide with the opening of the Expo.

Its architectural design was handled by the Renzo Piano Building Workshop, while the complex structural calculations were carried out by the engineering firm Ove Arup & Partners, under the leadership of Peter Rice, a celebrated engineer who had previously collaborated with Piano on projects such as the Centre Pompidou in Paris.

Over the years, the structure has undergone maintenance to counteract wear caused by weathering and salt corrosion. A major restoration and repainting project began in 2025 to preserve its integrity and original appearance.

== Description and structure ==
The Bigo is a complex cable-stayed steel structure, consisting of a central inclined mast and a series of seven arms of varying lengths and functions that radiate outwards. Its multifunctional design makes it a central element of the Old Port. From an engineering perspective, it is classified as a complex hybrid structure, simultaneously falling into multiple categories: a cable-stayed mast, a suspended cable-and-arch structure, and a suspended cable-stayed roof structure supporting tent membranes.

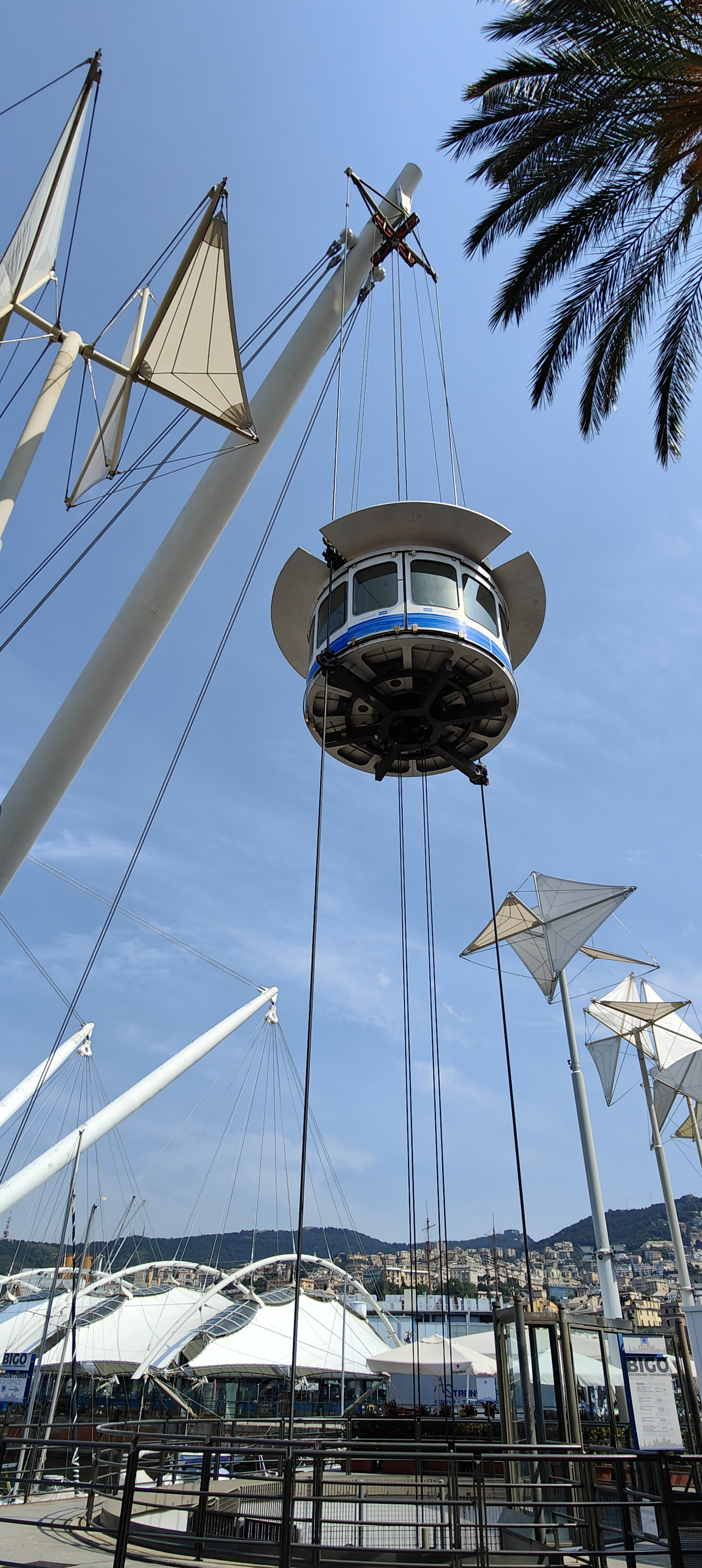
The panoramic elevator of the Bigo. Some of its arms support the canopy of Piazza delle Feste.

=== The panoramic elevator ===
The most famous feature of the Bigo is its panoramic elevator, built by the company Sabiem. The cabin, which can carry up to 30 people, slowly ascends to a height of 40 meters while completing a 360° rotation, allowing visitors to admire the port, the historic city center, and the surrounding hills. The ride is accompanied by a multilingual audio guide and descriptive panels that help identify key buildings and monuments.

The lifting system, based on a rack and pinion mechanism with tensioned cables, ensures stability even in strong winds. The structure is equipped with dual braking systems and automatic safety devices for emergency maneuvers.

=== Support for the Piazza delle Feste ===
In addition to its tourist function, the Bigo plays a fundamental structural role. Its two longest, inclined arms support, via a system of tension cables, the large polyester and PVC tensile structure that covers Piazza delle Feste. This integration of a scenic element with a functional infrastructure is one of the most innovative aspects of the project.

Sixteen cables support a series of slender, curved ribs, which in turn hold the canopy. The canopy is composed of five panels of PTFE-coated fiberglass membrane, kept under constant tension. The gaps between the panels are sealed with glass panes mounted on a mobile mechanism, allowing them to adapt to structural movements caused by variable loads, such as wind.

Piazza delle Feste is a multipurpose venue used for events, concerts, and an ice skating rink in the winter.

== Architectural significance and symbolism ==
The Bigo is considered one of the most representative works of Renzo Piano's architectural philosophy, which is based on the integration of technology, structural simplicity, and respect for the site's historical memory. The architect himself described the port interventions as "very simple gestures that, precisely because of their calmness, gain more strength."

The name and design are a direct homage to the bighi, the metal cranes that once populated the port's docks for cargo handling, creating a strong link between the new urban landscape and Genoa's industrial and maritime past.

The work has been described as a "sculpture-infrastructure," as it successfully combines an aesthetic and symbolic dimension with a purely technical function. Today, along with the Aquarium of Genoa and the Biosfera, the Bigo is one of the most recognizable symbols of contemporary Genoa and the successful regeneration of its waterfront.

== See also ==
- Genoa Expo '92
- Renzo Piano
- Biosfera
- Aquarium of Genoa

== Bibliography ==
- Colombo '92. Milan: Lybra Editore. 1992.
- Giovanna Rosso Del Brenna (2014). Dalla Fiera del Mare all'Aeroporto. Archeologia industriale e architettura contemporanea nel Porto di Genova. Collana "per mare". Vol. 3. Sagep editori srl. ISBN 9788863732344.
