= Neptune (galleon) =

1986 ship replica in Genoa, Italy

Coordinates: 44.4110°N 8.9271°E

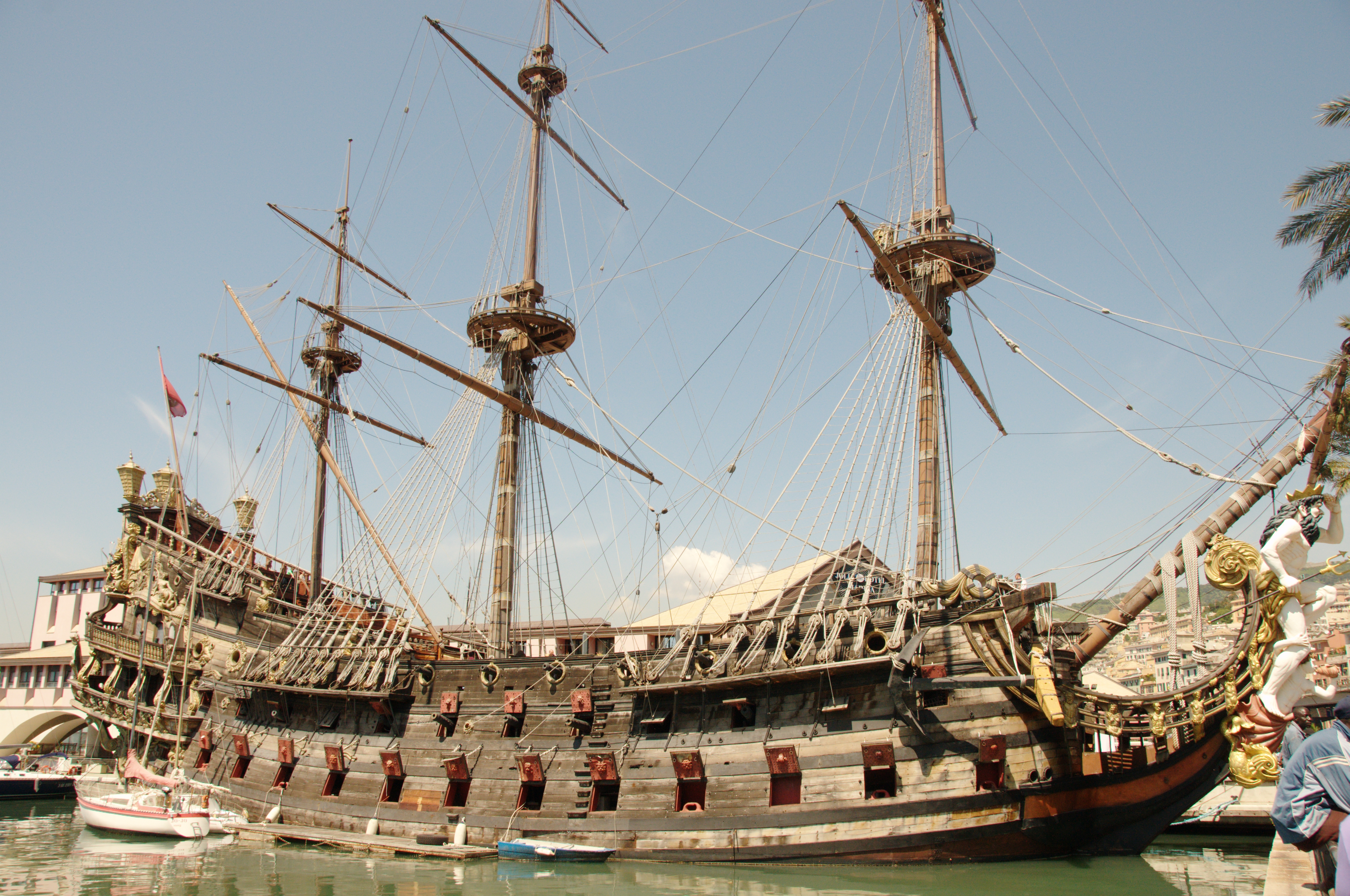
- Neptune docked in Genoa

History

Italy
- Name: Il Galeone Neptune
- Port of registry: Tunisian Naval Registry
- Builder: Port El Kantaoui, Tunisia
- Launched: 1986
- Homeport: Genoa, Italy

General characteristics
- Tonnage: 1,500 t (1,500 long tons)
- Length: 65 m (213 ft 3 in)
- Beam: 16.40 m (53 ft 10 in)
- Draft: 2.2 m (7 ft 3 in)
- Propulsion: Full-rigged ship
- Speed: 5 knots (9.3 km/h; 5.8 mph)

Neptune is a ship replica of a fictional 17th-century galleon designed by naval architect David Cannell. The ship was built in 1985 for Roman Polanski's film Pirates, where she portrayed the Spanish ship of the same name. The ship is an accurate replica above the waterline, but sporting a partly steel hull, planked in timber and two main engines with Schottel drive.

The Neptune is currently a tourist attraction in the port of Genoa, Italy, where its interior can be visited for a 6-euro entry fee for adults and 4 euros for children. In 2011, she portrayed the Jolly Roger, the ship of Captain Hook, in the TV miniseries Neverland.

== Gallery ==
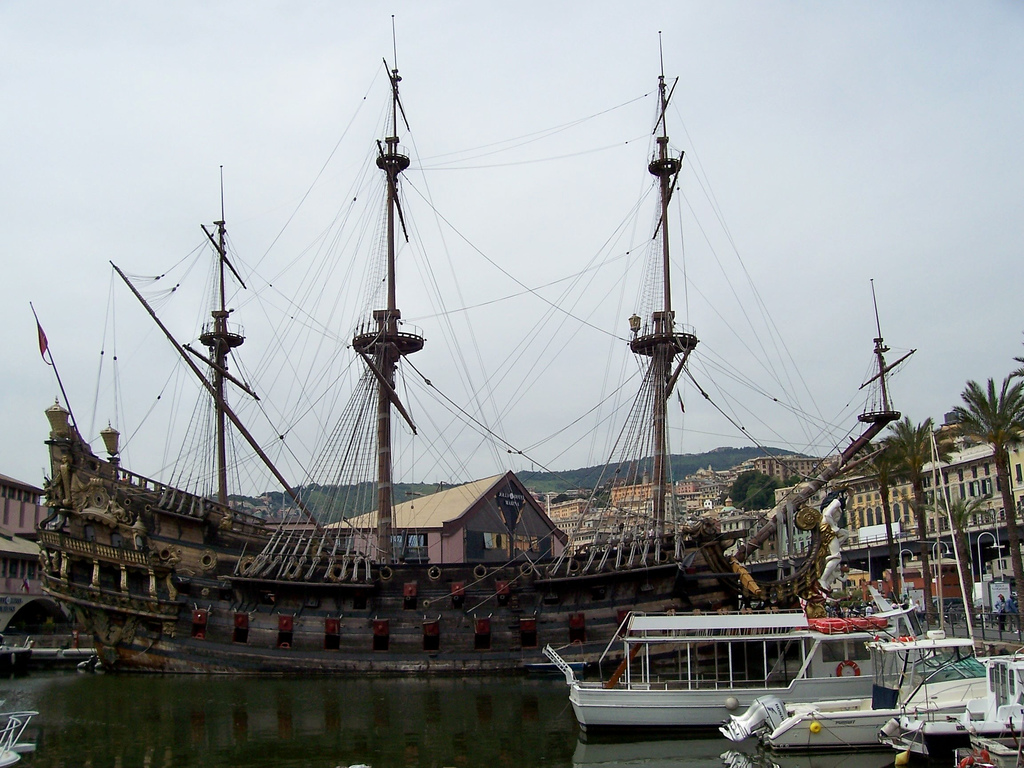

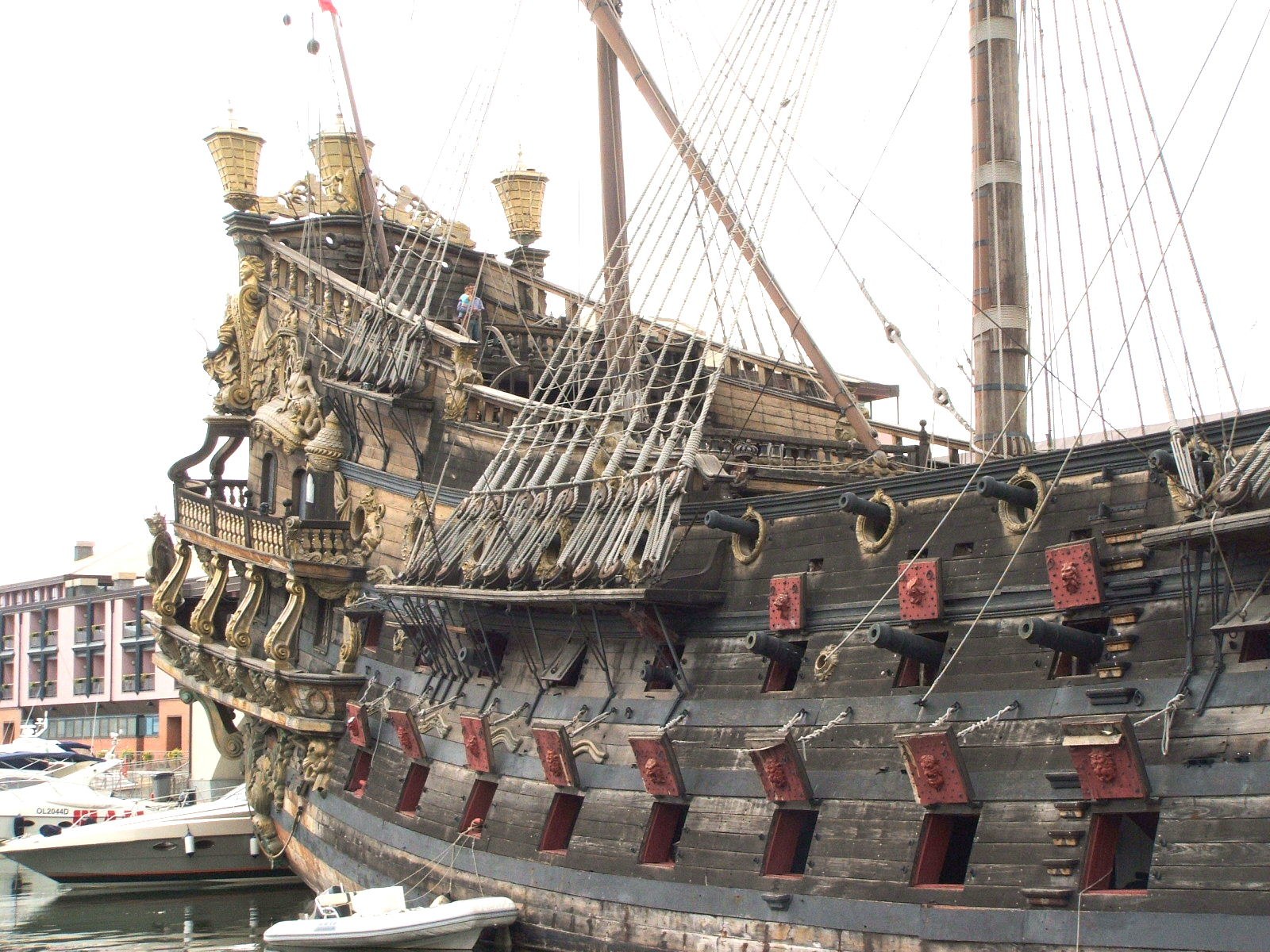

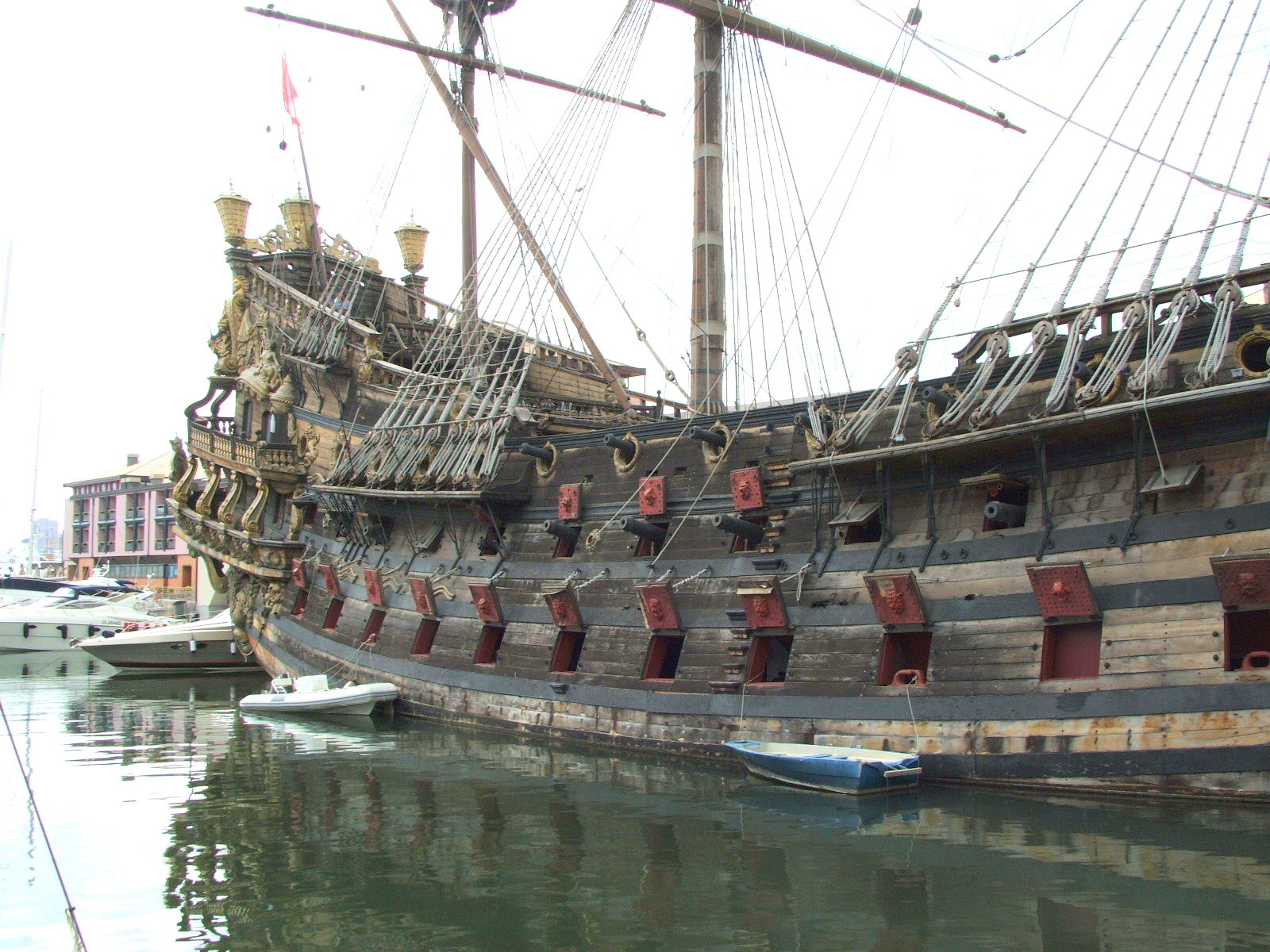

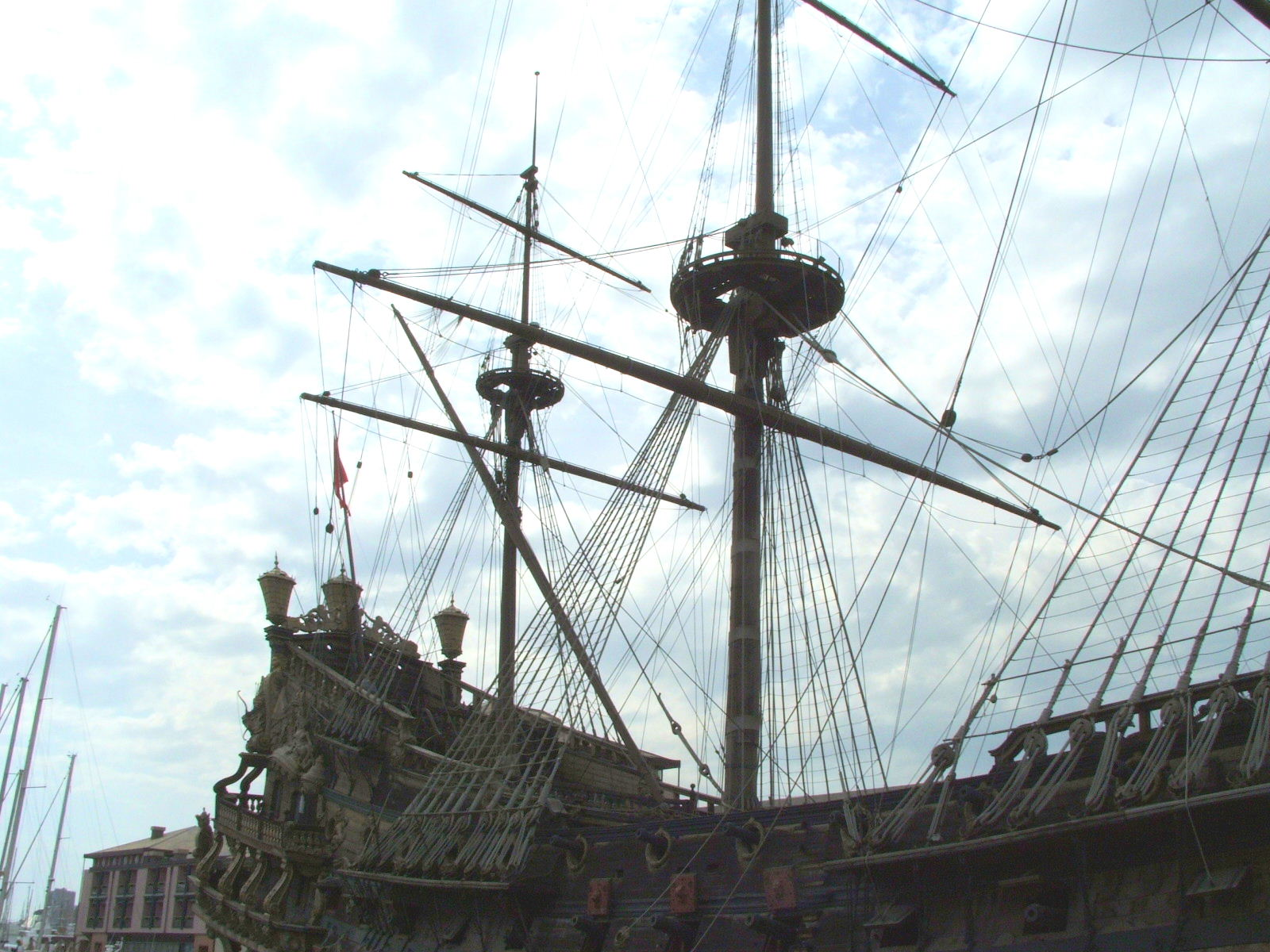

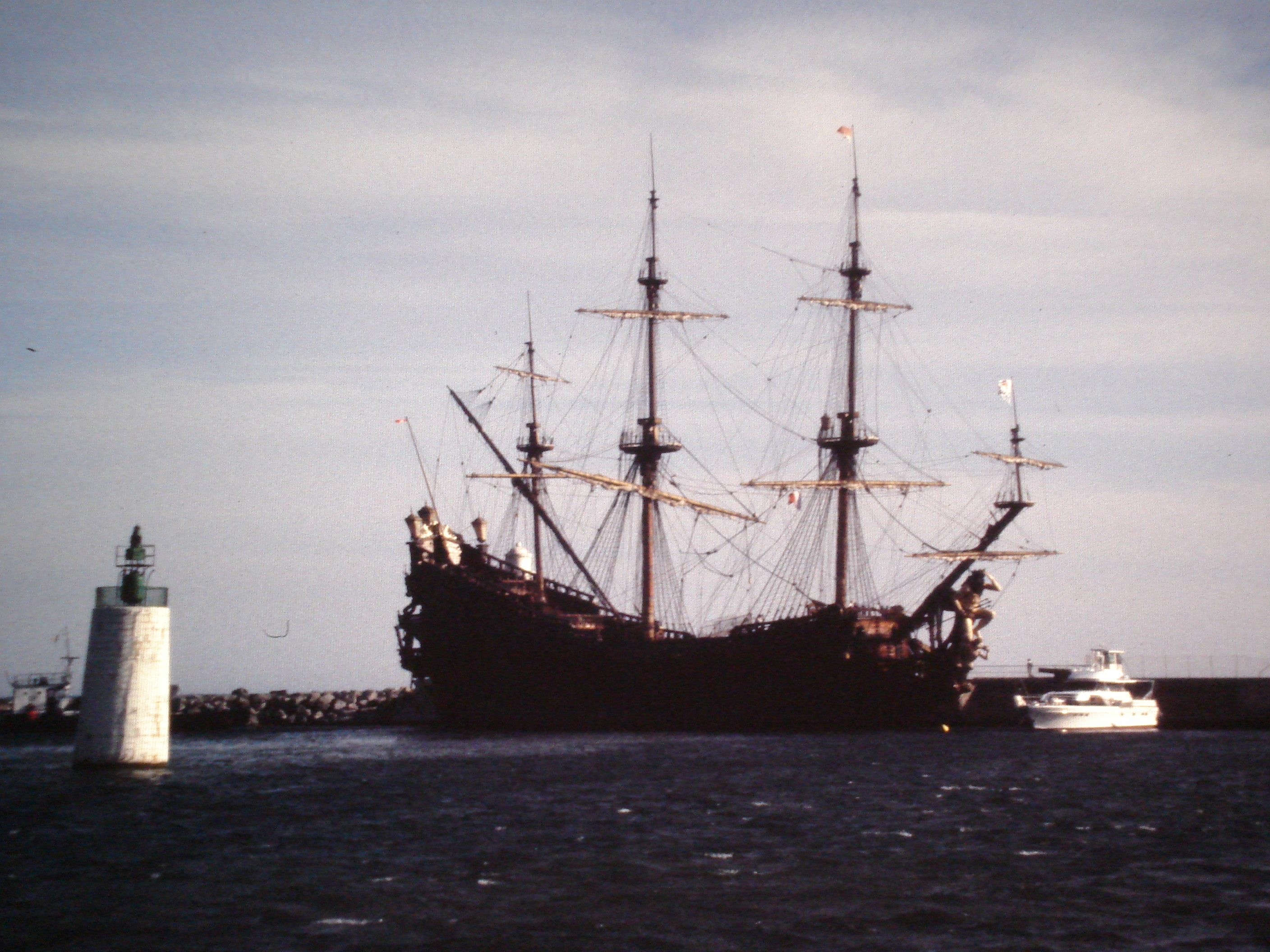

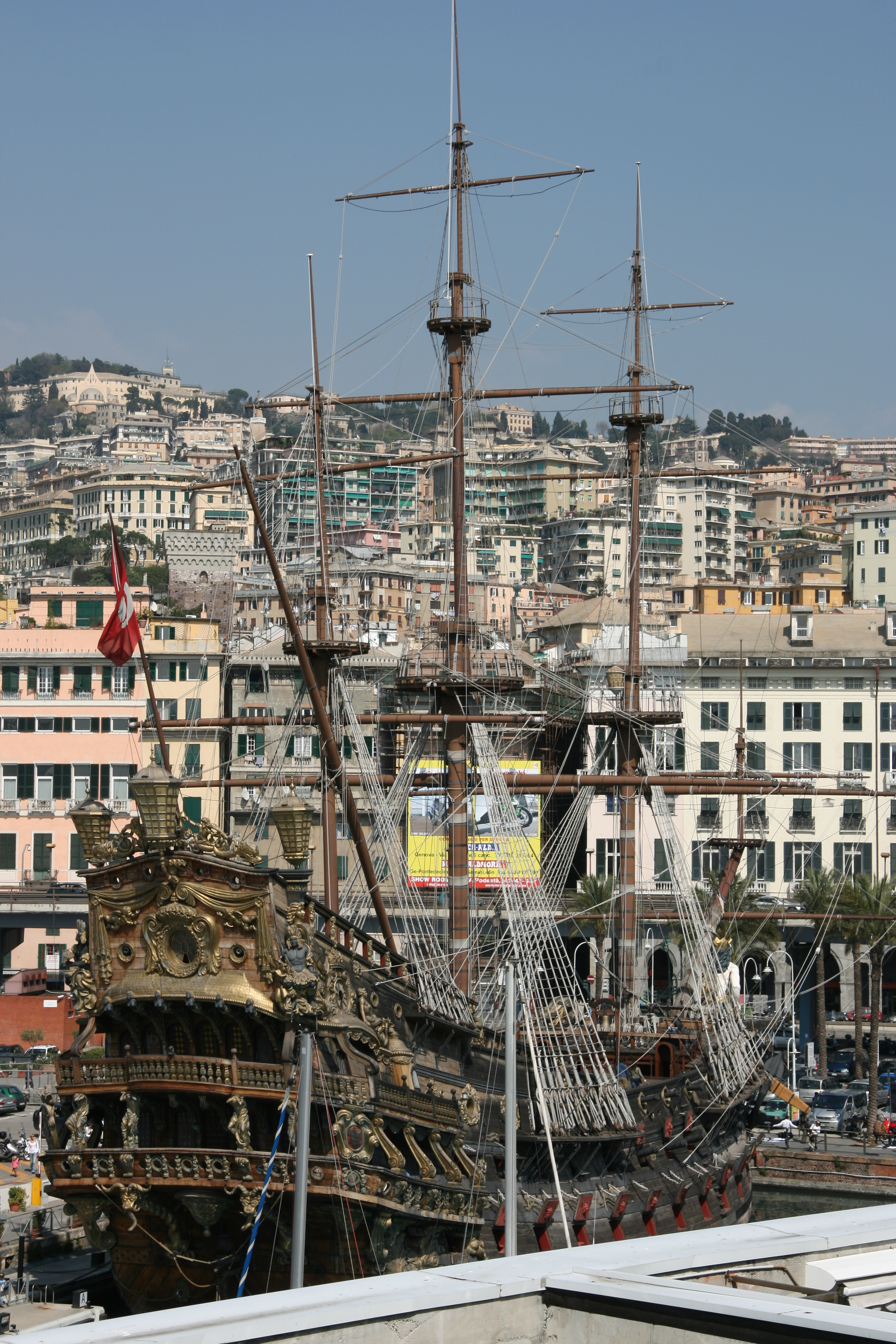

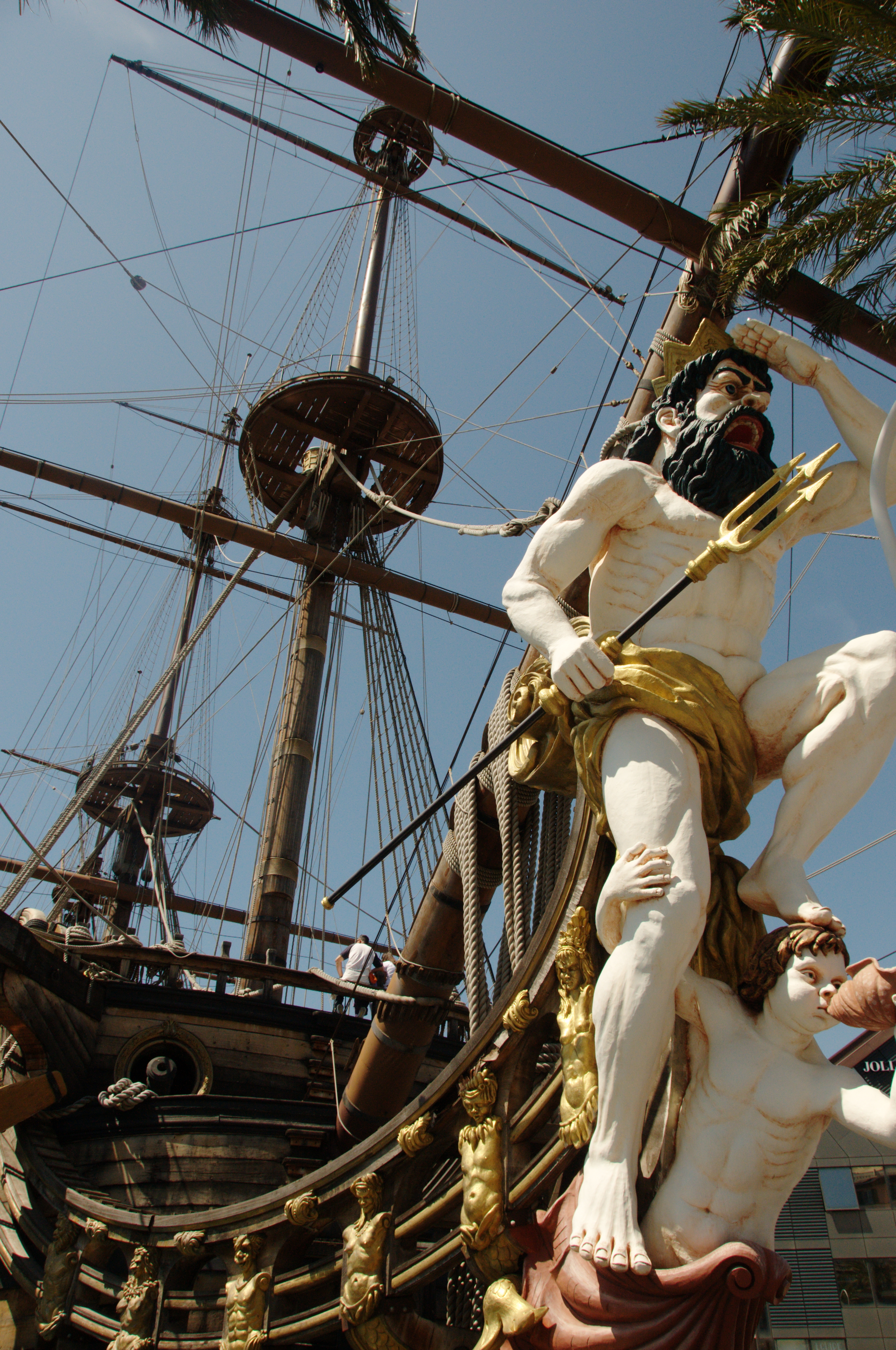

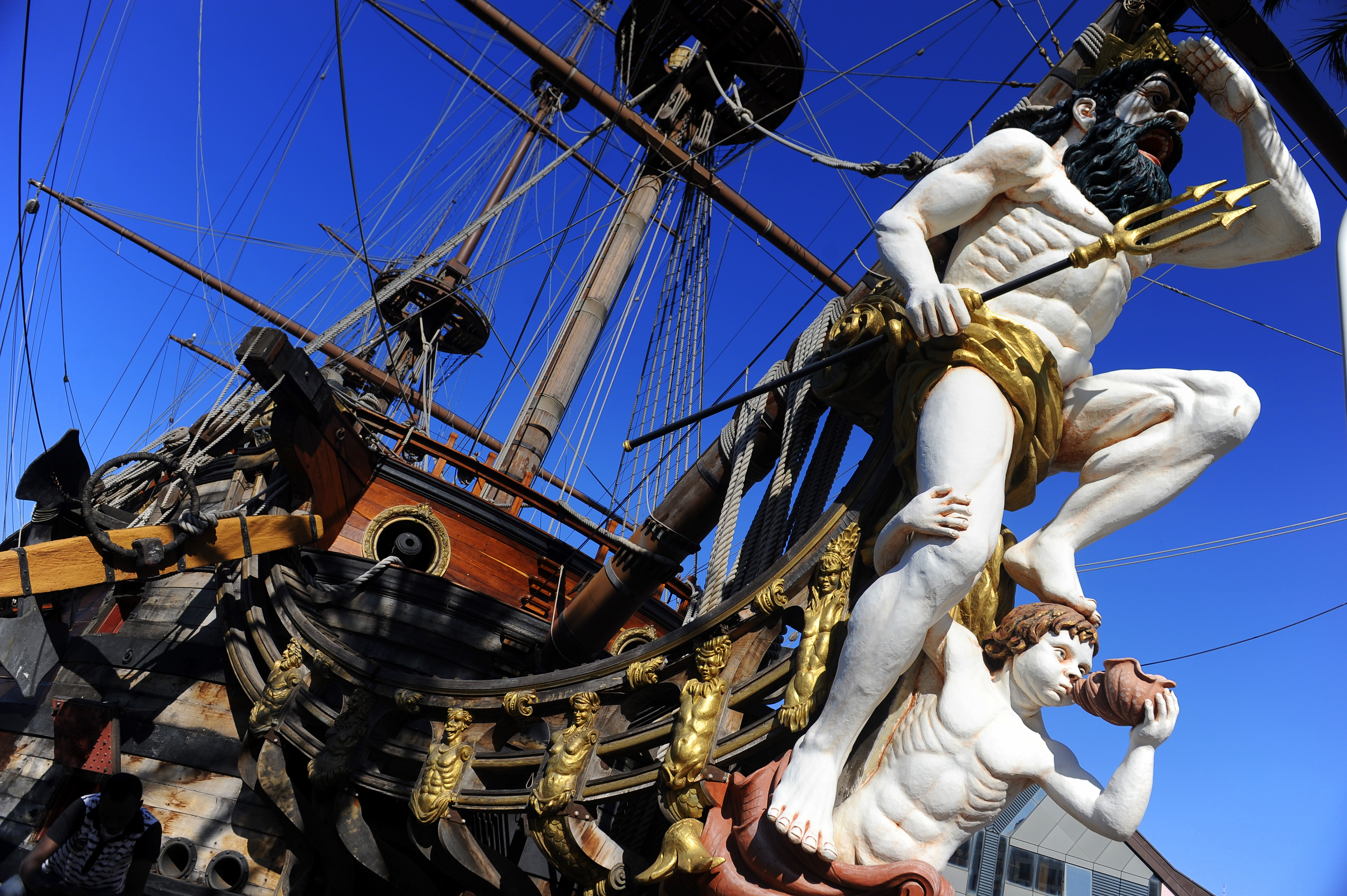

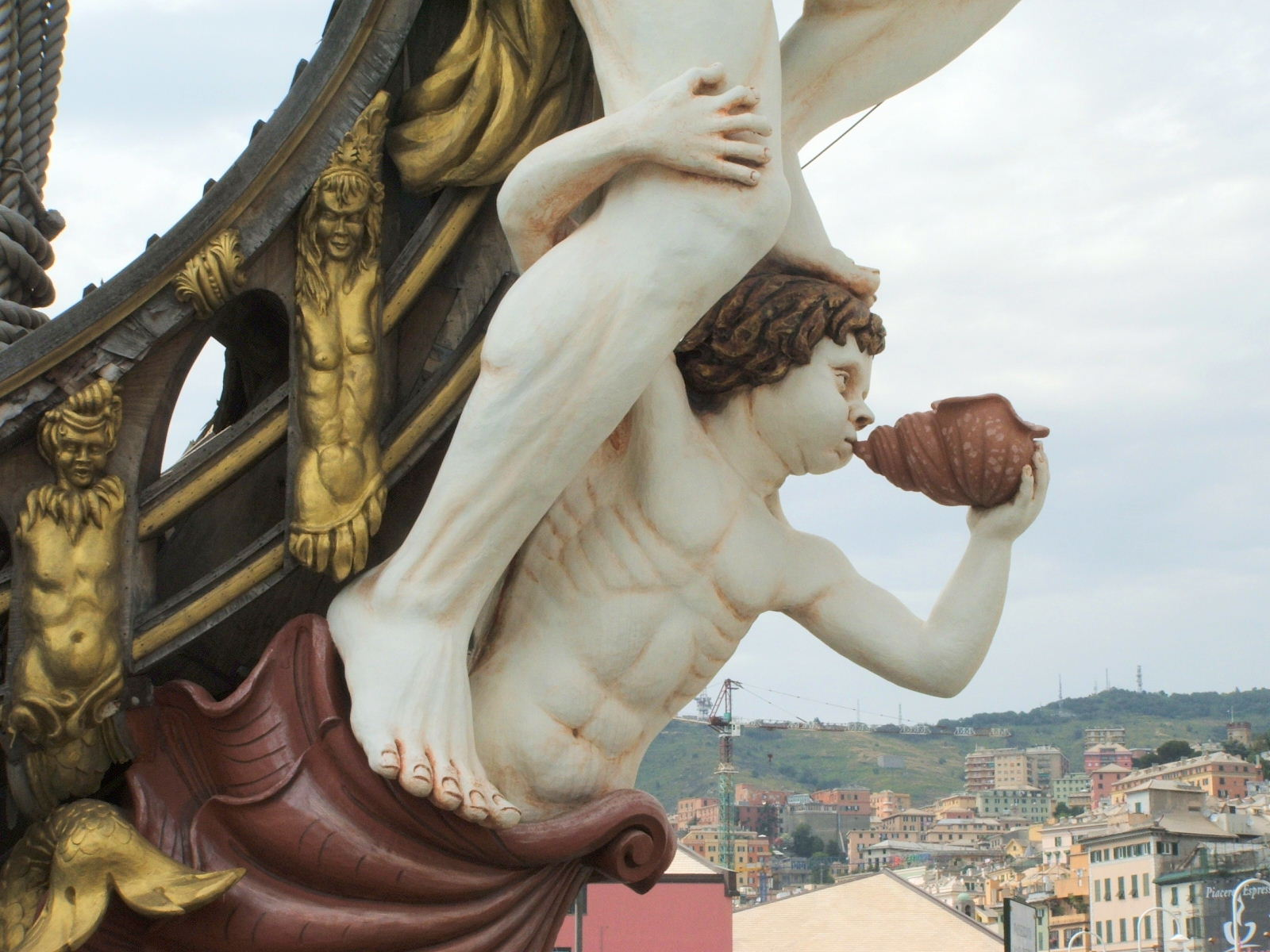

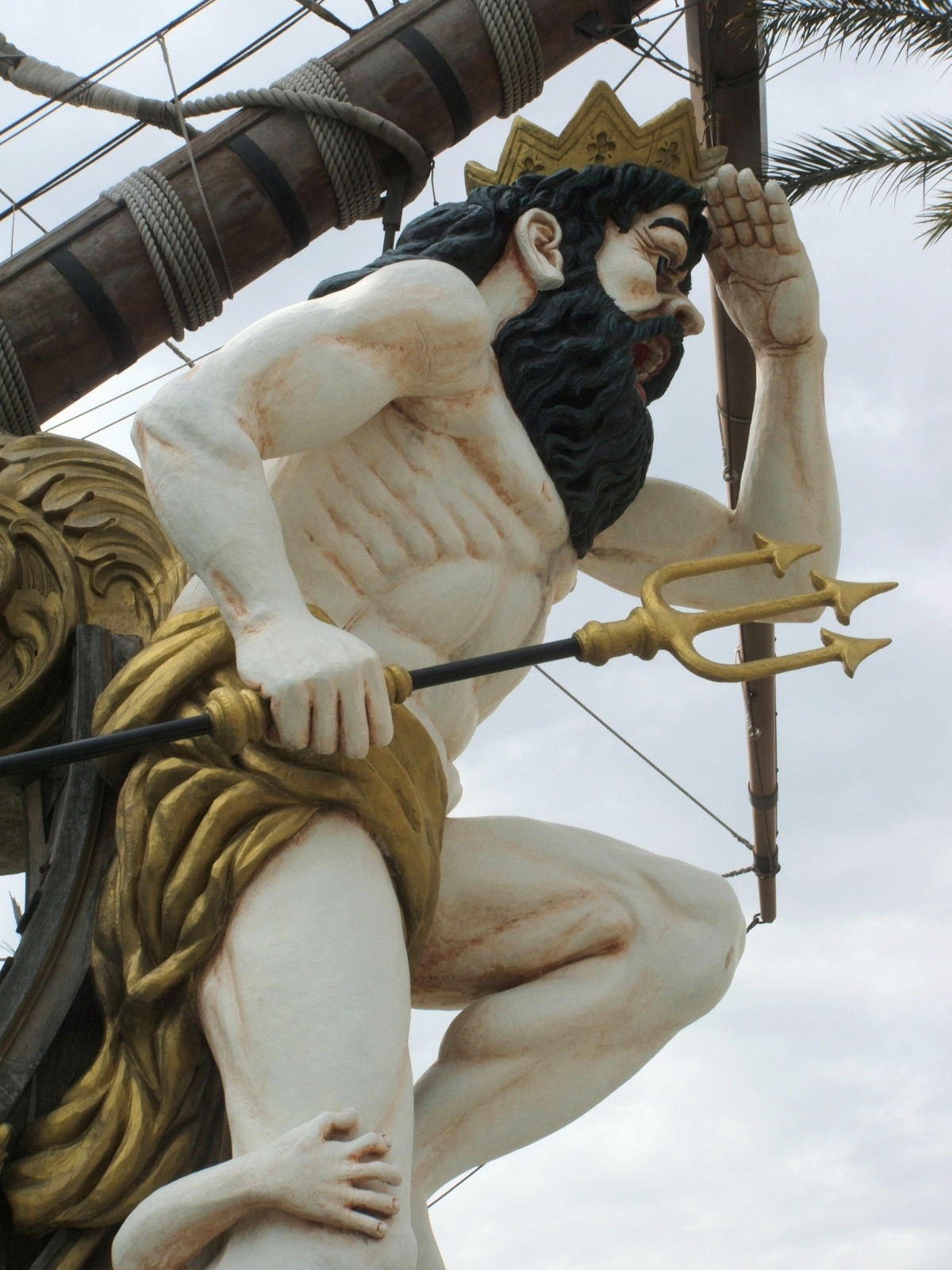

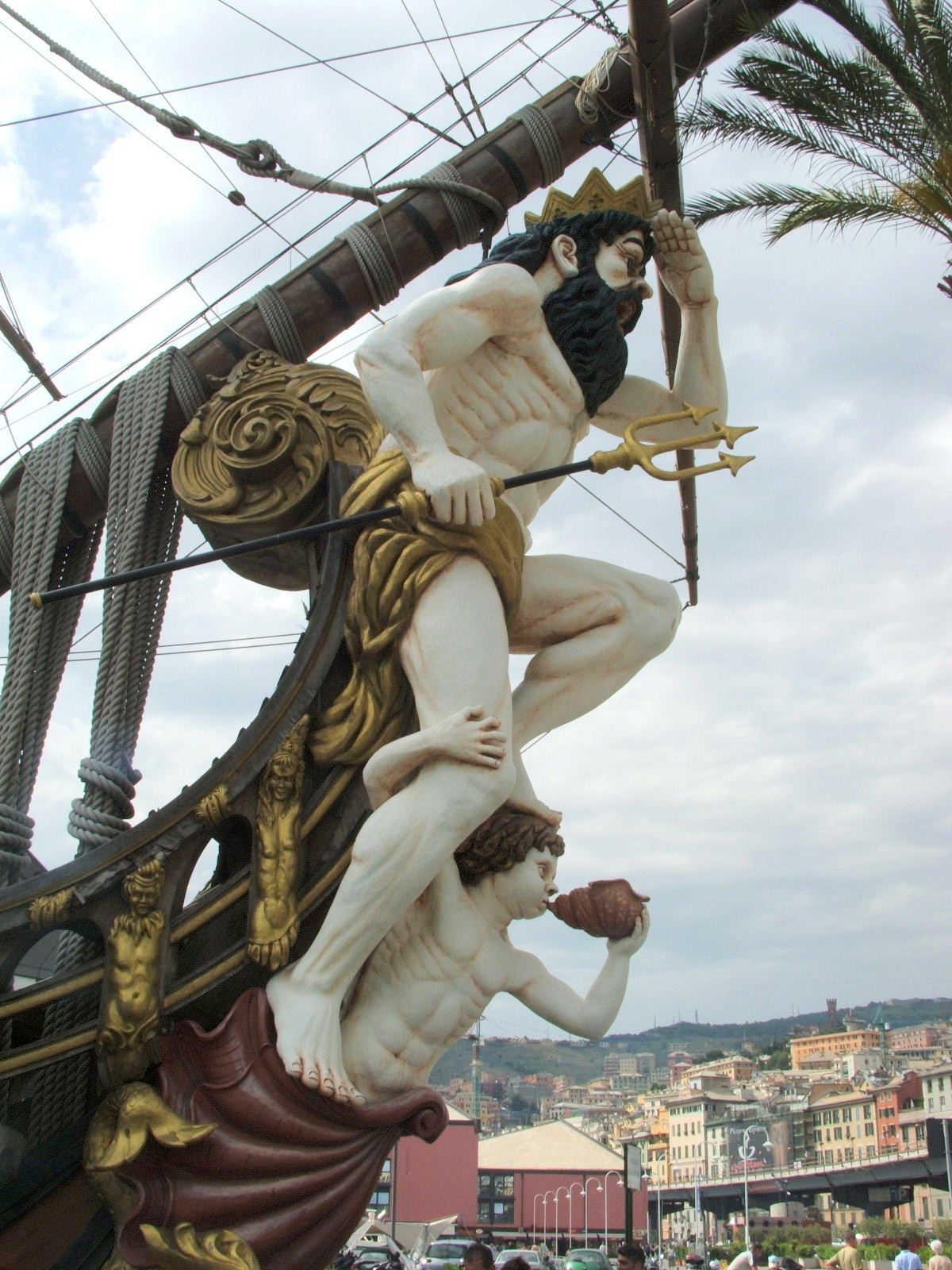

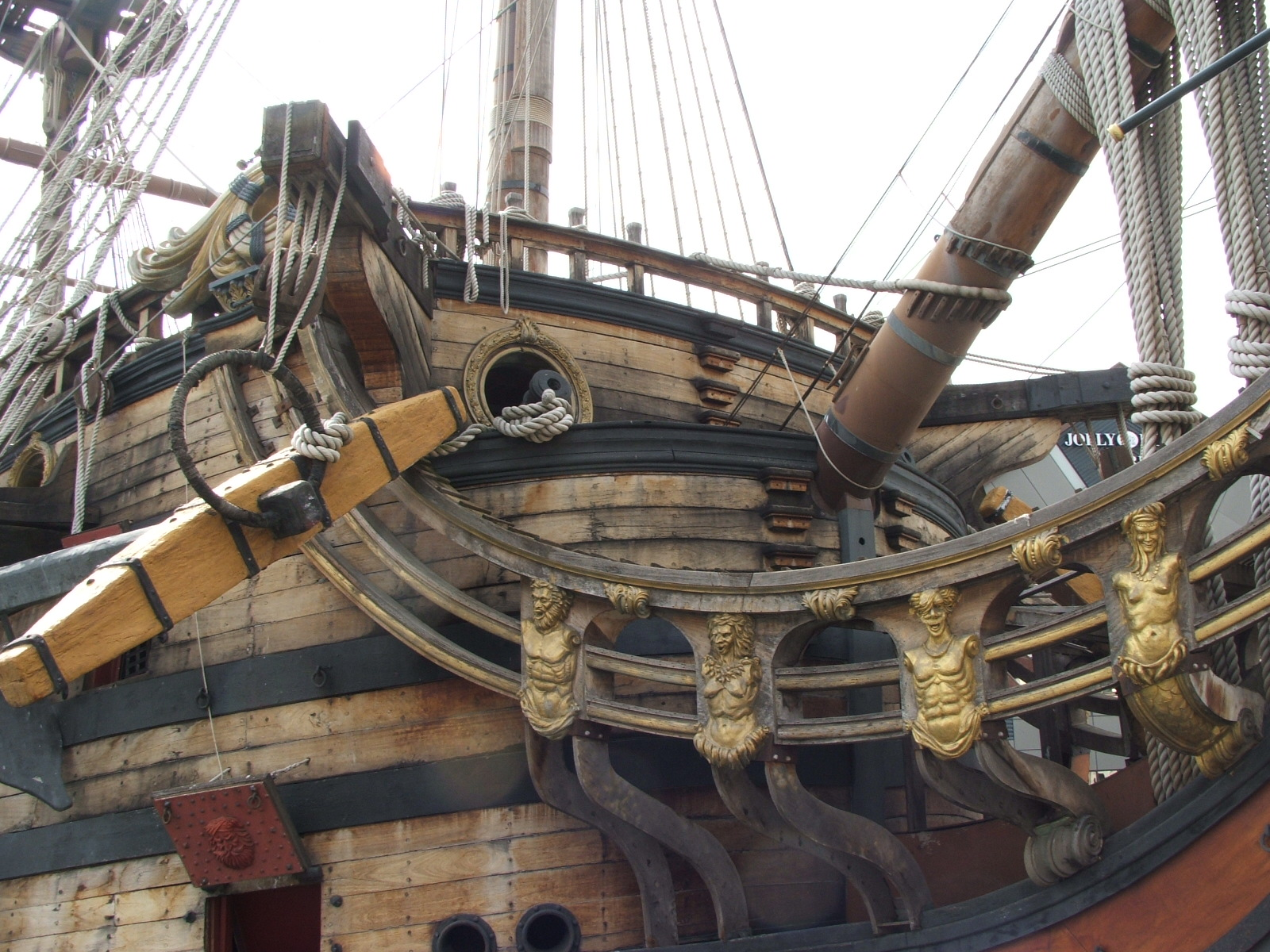

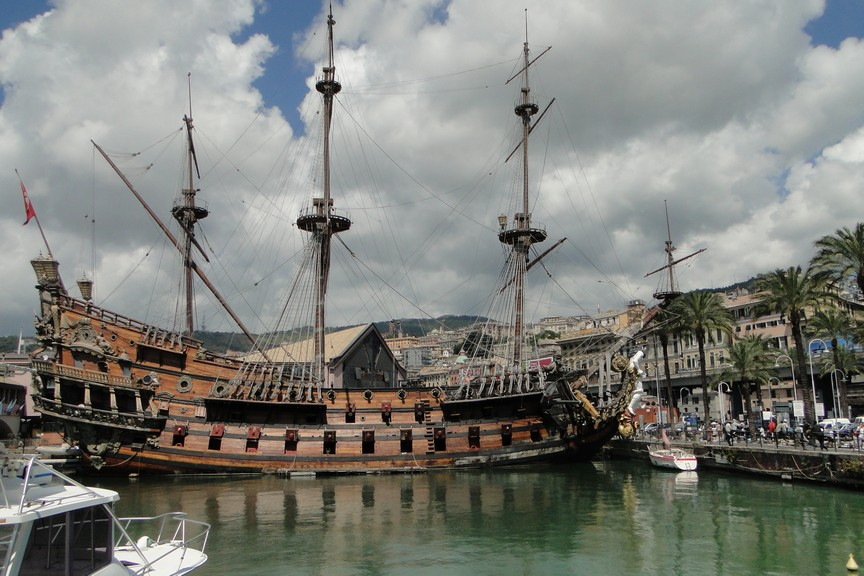

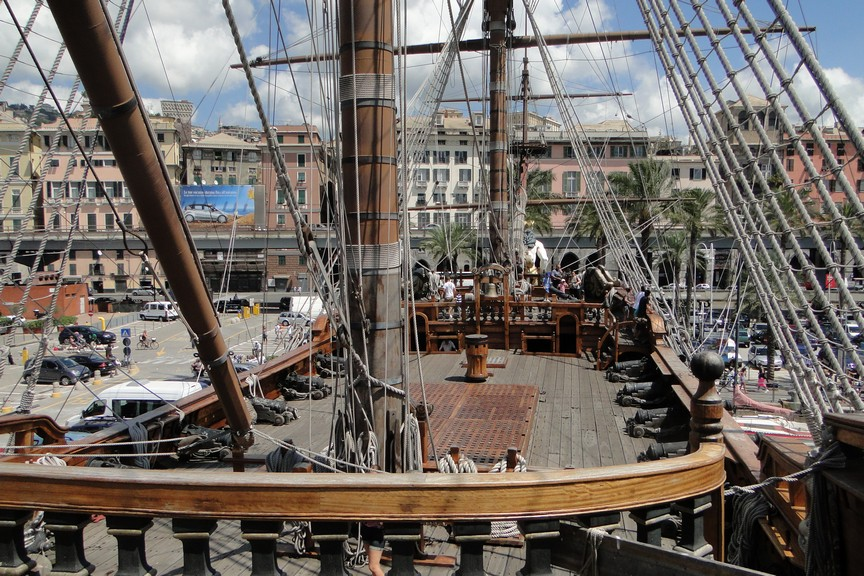

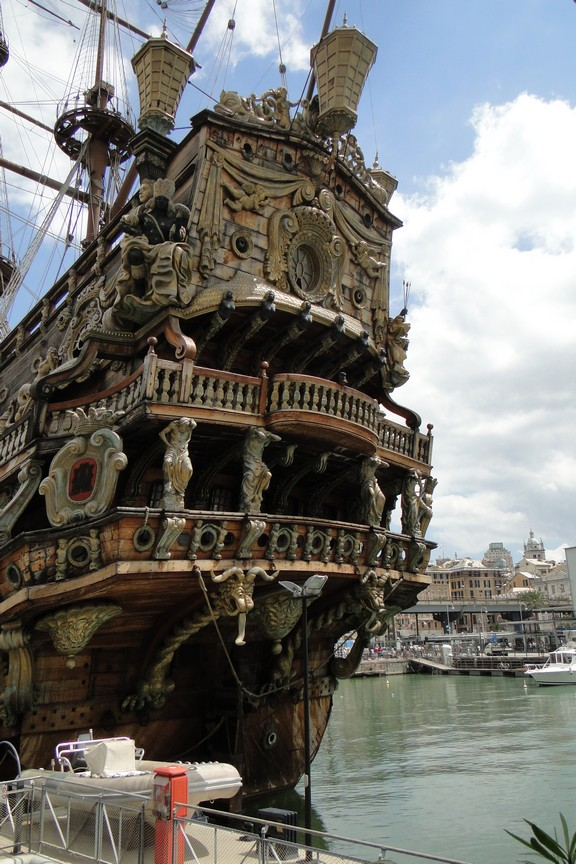

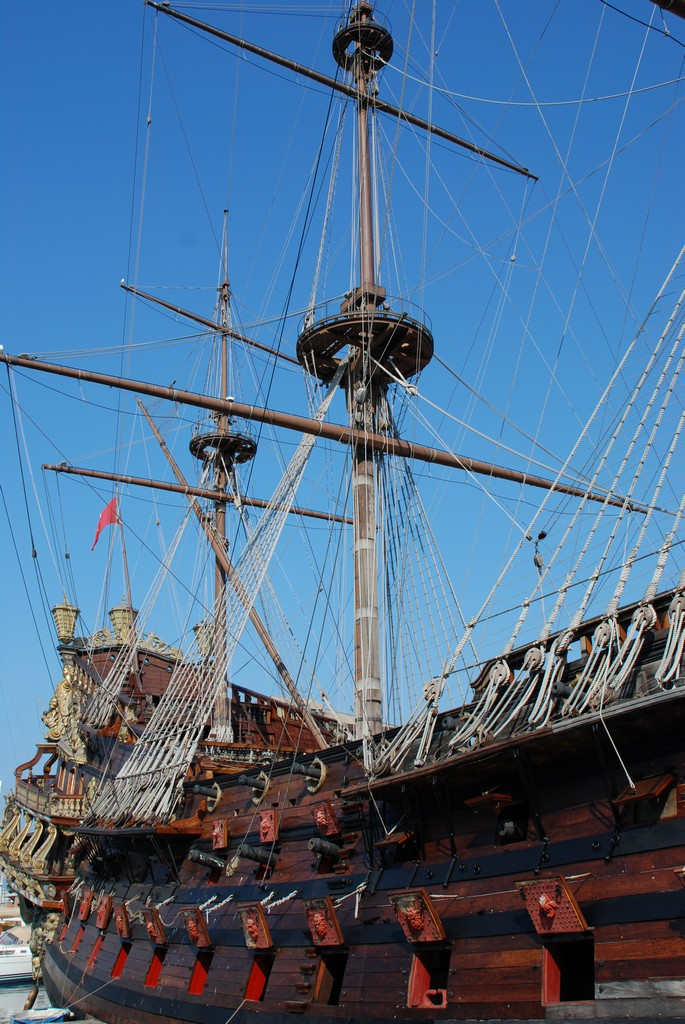
