= Biosphere (Genoa) =

Biosfera
- La Bolla di Renzo Piano
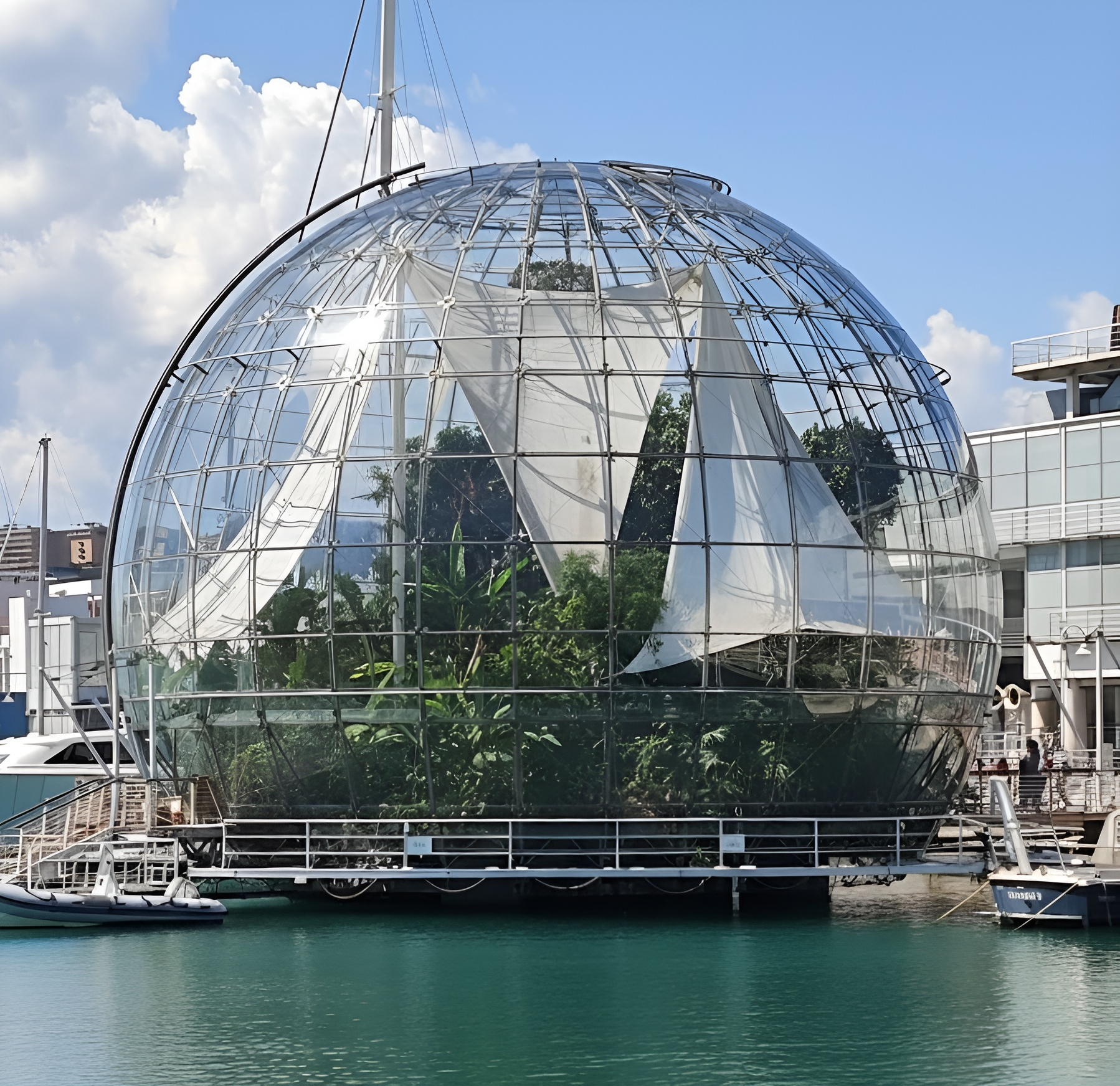
- Interactive map of the Biosfera area

General information
- Status: Completed
- Location: Porto Antico, Genoa, Italy
- Coordinates: 44°24′24″N 8°55′23″E

Dimensions
- Diameter: 20 metres (66 ft)
- Weight: 60 tonnes

Technical details
- Material: Glass, Steel
- Floor area: 200 square metres (2,200 sq ft)

Design and construction
- Architect: Renzo Piano

Website
- www.biosferagenova.it/cms/home.html

The Biosphere of Genoa (Italian: Biosfera), also commonly known as The Glass Bubble or Renzo Piano's Bubble (Italian: La Bolla di Renzo Piano), is a distinctive spherical glass and steel structure located inside Porto Antico (Old Harbour) of Genoa, Italy. Designed by architect Renzo Piano, the structure was constructed in 2001, initially for the G8 summit held in the city. The sphere is suspended over the sea at Ponte Spinola, positioned immediately adjacent to the Aquarium of Genoa.

Functioning as a greenhouse, the Biosfera recreates a complex micro-climate, housing a small tropical rainforest ecosystem with over 150 species of plants and animals, including tree ferns, palms, and various birds, turtles, and fish.

The structure is 20 metres (66 ft) in diameter, has a total weight of 60 tonnes, and provides an exhibition area of approximately 200 square metres (2,200 sq ft).

== Description ==
Inside, a small portion of a tropical rainforest has been recreated, hosting over 150 species of animal and plant organisms such as birds, turtles, fish, insects, large tree ferns (Pteridophyta) from the city's nurseries reaching up to seven meters in height, and various species of tropical plants traditionally used by humans. These plants thrive thanks to a computer-controlled climate system that maintains appropriate levels of temperature and humidity within the sphere.

It was designed by the Genoese architect Renzo Piano and opened to the public in 2001 on the occasion of the G8 summit in Genoa. Today, visiting the sphere is part of the Aquarium of Genoa tour.

There are two air conditioning systems: one artificial, used in winter, consists of thermal machines located beneath the sphere that exploit the heat of seawater to power, via a heat pump, a series of radiators; the other is natural, made up of a system of movable sails that adjust according to the sun's position, varying the amount of solar radiation entering (by shading more or less). "This system is essential for maintaining stable and optimal conditions, keeping the indoor temperature between 30 °C in summer and 14 °C in winter, along with a consistent humidity level of 60%.

The structure, designed by the famous Genoese architect, was officially inaugurated on January 19, 2002, by then Mayor of Genoa Giuseppe Pericu and Paolo Messina, CEO of Ignazio Messina & C. - which financed the project. However, a series of technical problems that endangered the survival of animal and plant species led to its closure in February 2003. After necessary adjustments, it was reopened on October 1, 2003.

== Life forms present ==
=== Animals ===
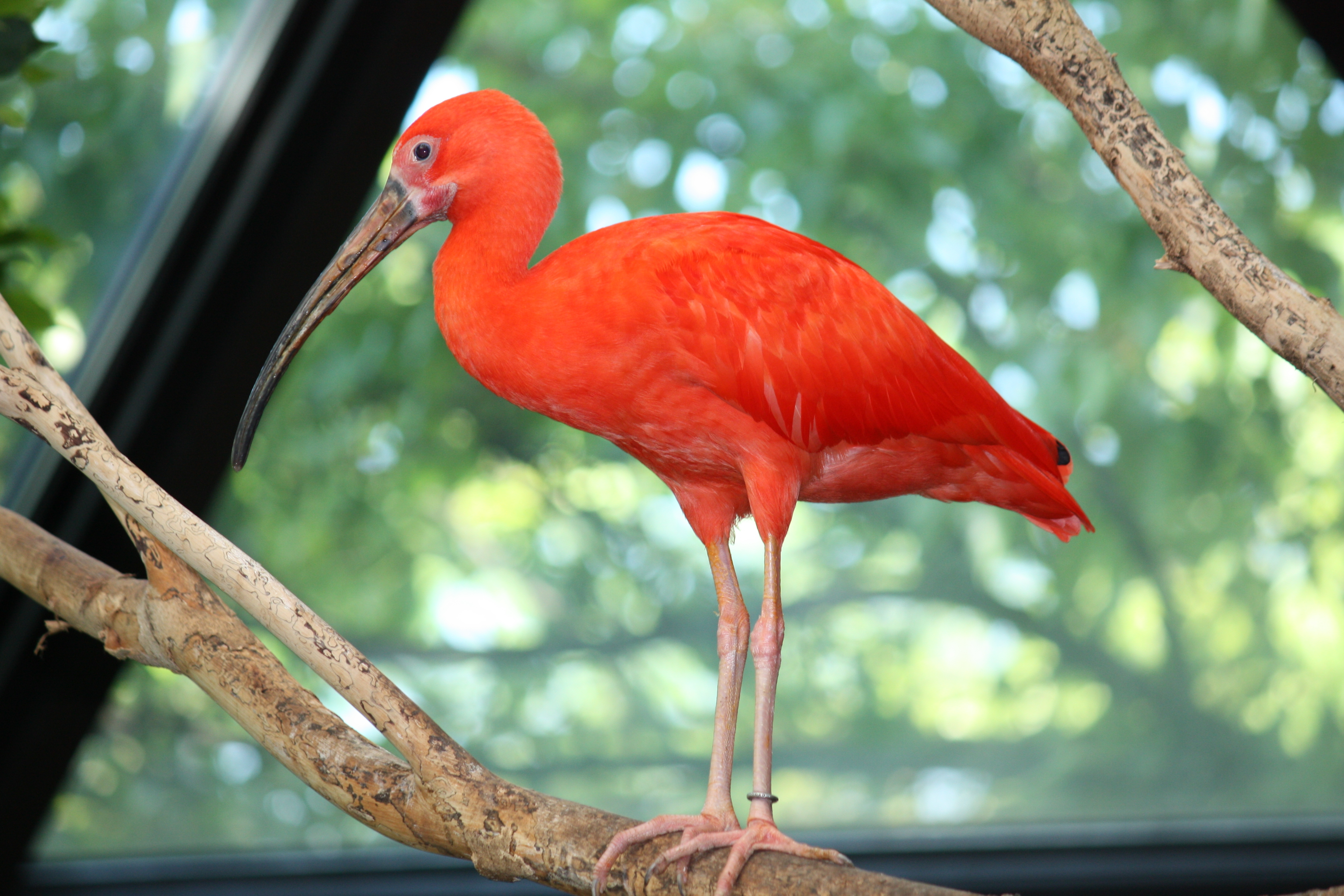
Scarlet ibis

- Ploceidae
- Scarlet ibis
- Salmon-crested cockatoo
- Superb starling
- Synoicus chinensis
- Diamond dove
- Zebra finch
- Red-eared slider turtle
- Stick insect
- African cichlids

=== Plants ===
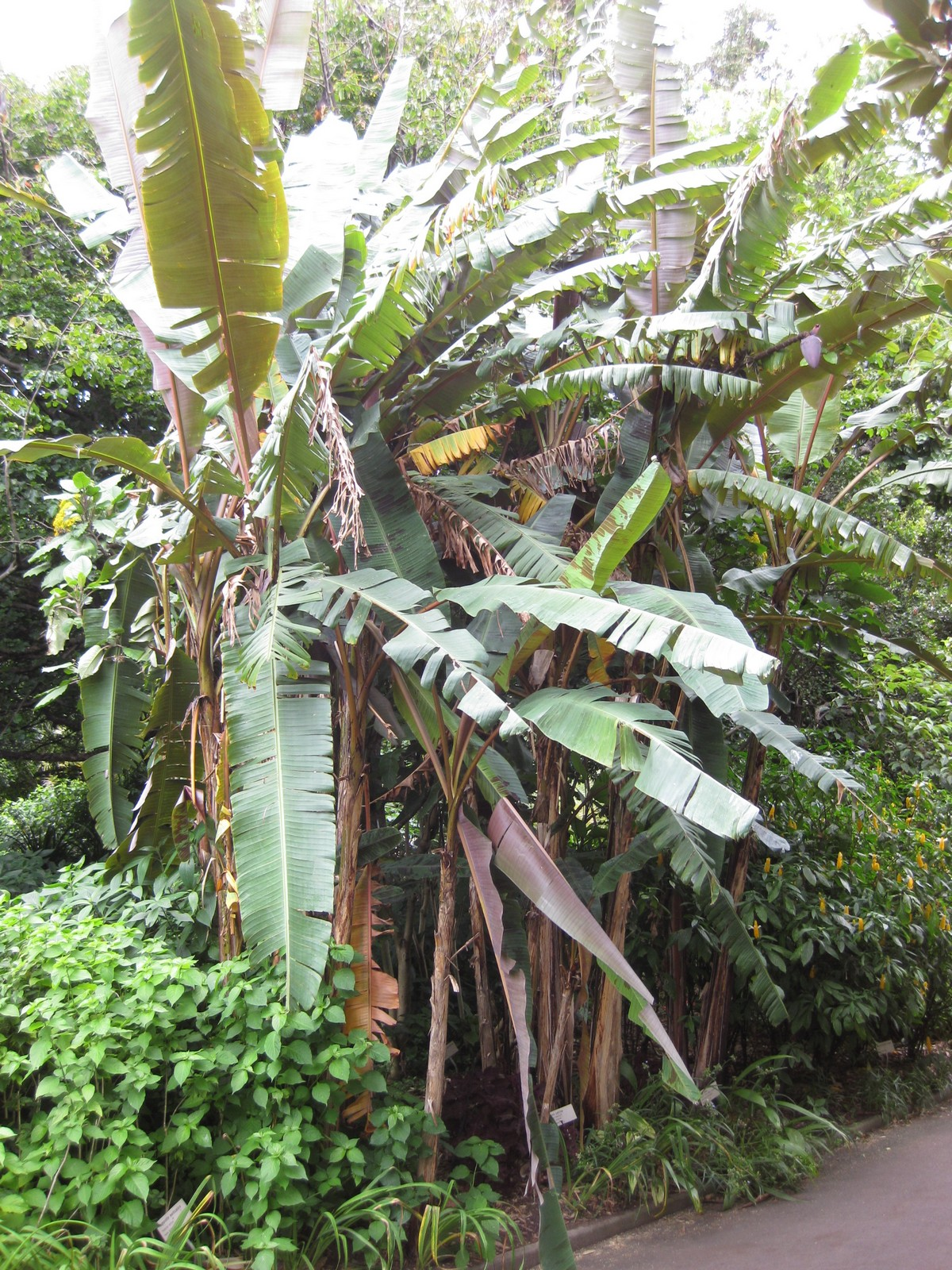
Banana plant

- Tree ferns
- Mangroves
- Acacia erioloba (camel thorn)
- Carica papaya (papaya)
- Ceiba speciosa (silk floss tree)
- Cinnamomum zeylanicum (cinnamon)
- Coffea (coffee)
- Couroupita guianensis (cannonball tree)
- Dendrobium compactum (orchid)
- Ficus benjamina
- Ficus sycomorus (sycamore fig)
- Gossypium (cotton)
- Manilkara chicle (chicle tree – chewing gum source)
- Musa acuminata (banana tree)
- Nepenthes (tropical pitcher plant)
- Passiflora phoenicea
- Phalaenopsis amabilis (moth orchid)
- Piper nigrum (black pepper)
- Ravenala madagascariensis (traveler's tree)
- Theobroma cacao (cocoa)
- Vanilla planifolia (vanilla)
