= Renzo Piano =

Italian architect (born 1937)

Senator for life Renzo Piano OMRI
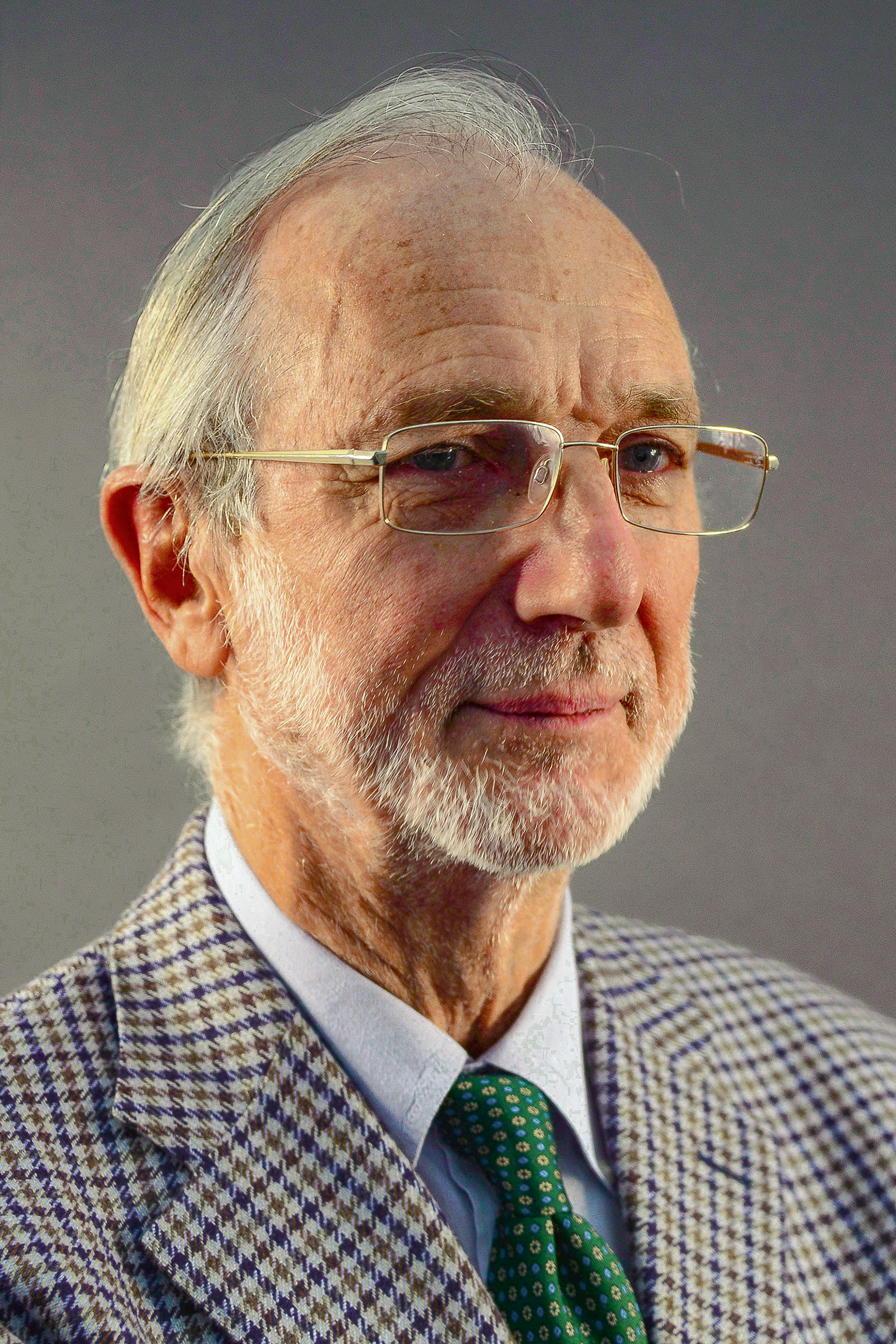
- Piano in 2012

Member of the Senate of the Republic
- Incumbent
- Life tenure 30 August 2013
- Appointed by: Giorgio Napolitano

Personal details
- Born: 14 September 1937 (age 89) Genoa, Kingdom of Italy
- Party: Independent
- Education: University of Florence; Polytechnic University of Milan
- Occupation: Architect
- Awards: Pritzker Architecture Prize; RIBA Gold Medal; Sonning Prize; AIA Gold Medal; Kyoto Prize
- Buildings: Kansai International Airport; Centre Georges Pompidou; Parco della Musica; The Shard; The New York Times Building; Whitney Museum of American Art; Los Angeles County Museum of Art

Renzo Piano (Italian: [ˈrɛntso ˈpjaːno]; born 14 September 1937) is an Italian architect. His notable works include the Centre Georges Pompidou in Paris (with Richard Rogers, 1977), The Shard in London (2012), Kansai International Airport in Osaka (1994), the Whitney Museum of American Art in New York City (2015), Istanbul Museum of Modern Art in Istanbul (2022), Stavros Niarchos Foundation Cultural Center in Athens (2016) and The New York Times Building in New York City (2007). He was awarded the Pritzker Architecture Prize in 1998.

Piano has served as a senator for life in the Italian Senate since 2013.

== Early life and first buildings ==
Piano was born and raised in Genoa, Italy, into a family of builders. His grandfather had created a masonry enterprise, which had been expanded by his father, Carlo Piano, and his father's three brothers, into the firm Fratelli Piano. The firm prospered after World War II, constructing houses and factories and selling construction materials. When his father retired, the enterprise was led by Renzo's older brother, Ermanno, who studied engineering at the University of Genoa. Renzo studied architecture at the University of Florence and Polytechnic University of Milan. He graduated in 1964 with a dissertation about modular coordination (coordinazione modulare) supervised by Giuseppe Ciribini and began working with experimental lightweight structures and basic shelters.

Piano taught at the Polytechnic University from 1965 until 1968, and expanded his horizons and technical skills by working in two large international firms, for the modernist architect Louis Kahn in Philadelphia and for the Polish engineer Zygmunt Stanisław Makowski in London. He completed his first building, the IPE factory in Genoa, in 1968, with a roof of steel and reinforced polyester, and created a continuous membrane for the covering of a pavilion at the Milan Triennale in the same year. In 1970, he received his first international commission, for the Pavilion of Italian Industry for Expo 70 in Osaka, Japan. He collaborated with his brother Ermanno and the family firm, which manufactured the structure. It was lightweight and original composed of steel and reinforced polyester, and it appeared to be simultaneously artistic and industrial.

The 1970 Osaka structure was greatly admired by the British architect Richard Rogers, and in 1971 the two men decided to open their own firm, Piano and Rogers, where they worked together from 1971 to 1977. The first project of the firm was the administrative building of B&B Italia, an Italian furniture company, in Novedrate, Como, Italy. This design featured suspended container and an open bearing structure, with the conduits for heating and water on the exterior painted in bright colors (blue, red and yellow). These unusual features attracted considerable attention in the architectural world, and influenced the choice of the jurors who selected Piano and Rogers to design the Pompidou Center.

== The Centre Pompidou and early projects 1973–1977 ==
Centre Georges Pompidou in Paris (1971–1977)

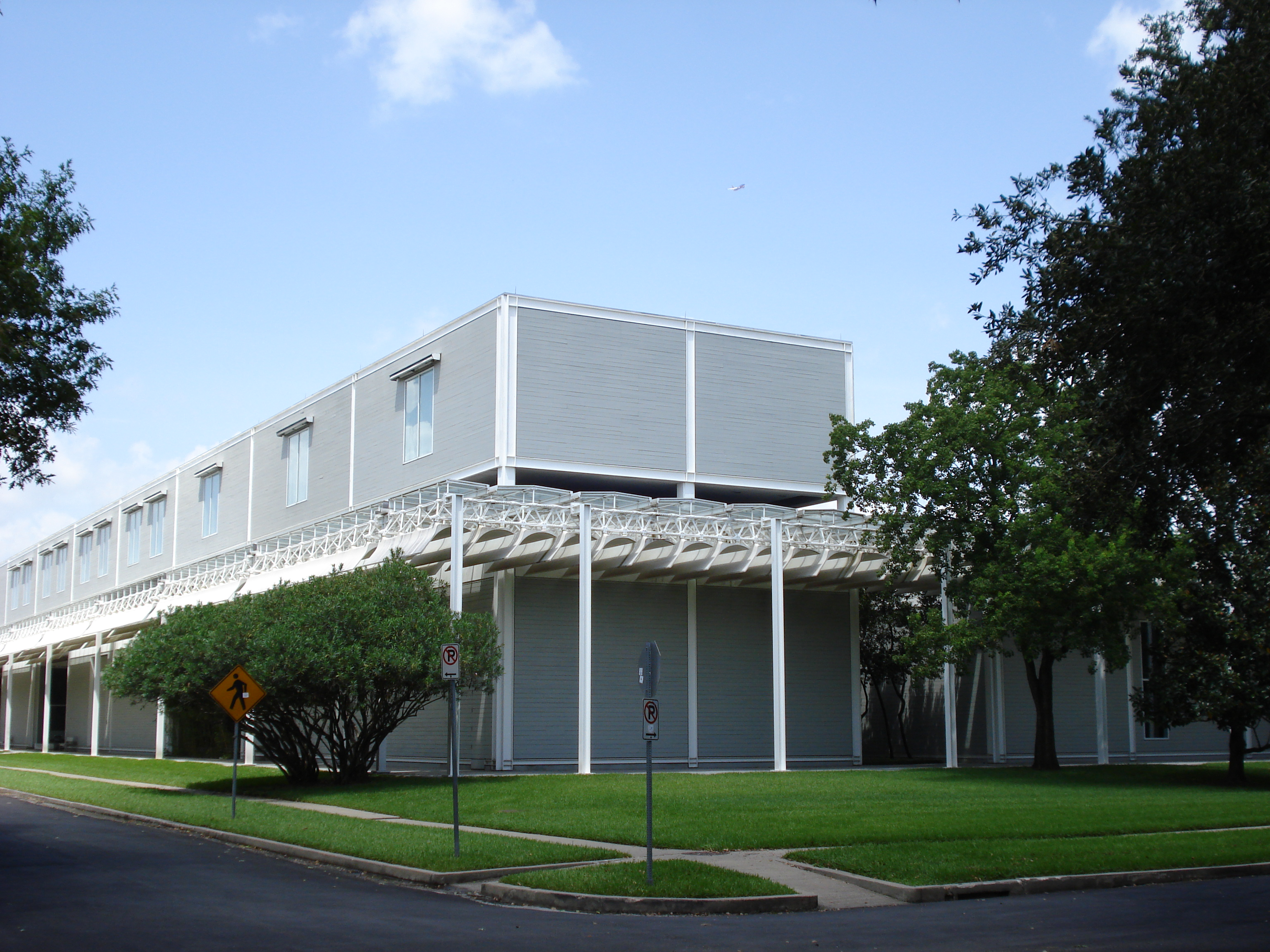
The Menil Collection in Houston, Texas (1982–1987)

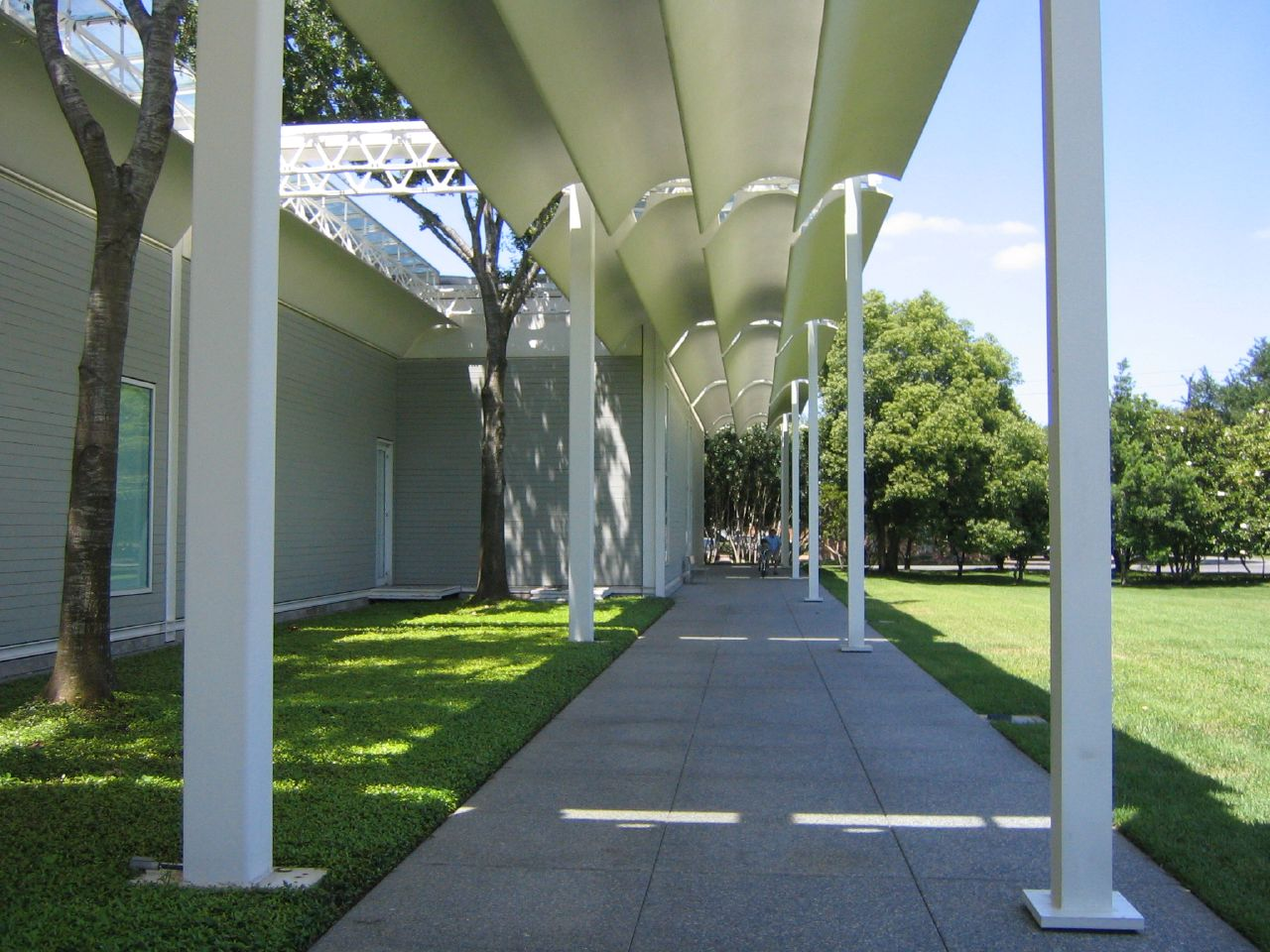
Sunscreens of the Menil Collection (1982–1987)

The Biosphere in the Old Port of Genoa (1985–2001)

Aquarium of Genoa (1992)

The Bigo in the Old Port of Genoa (1985–2001)

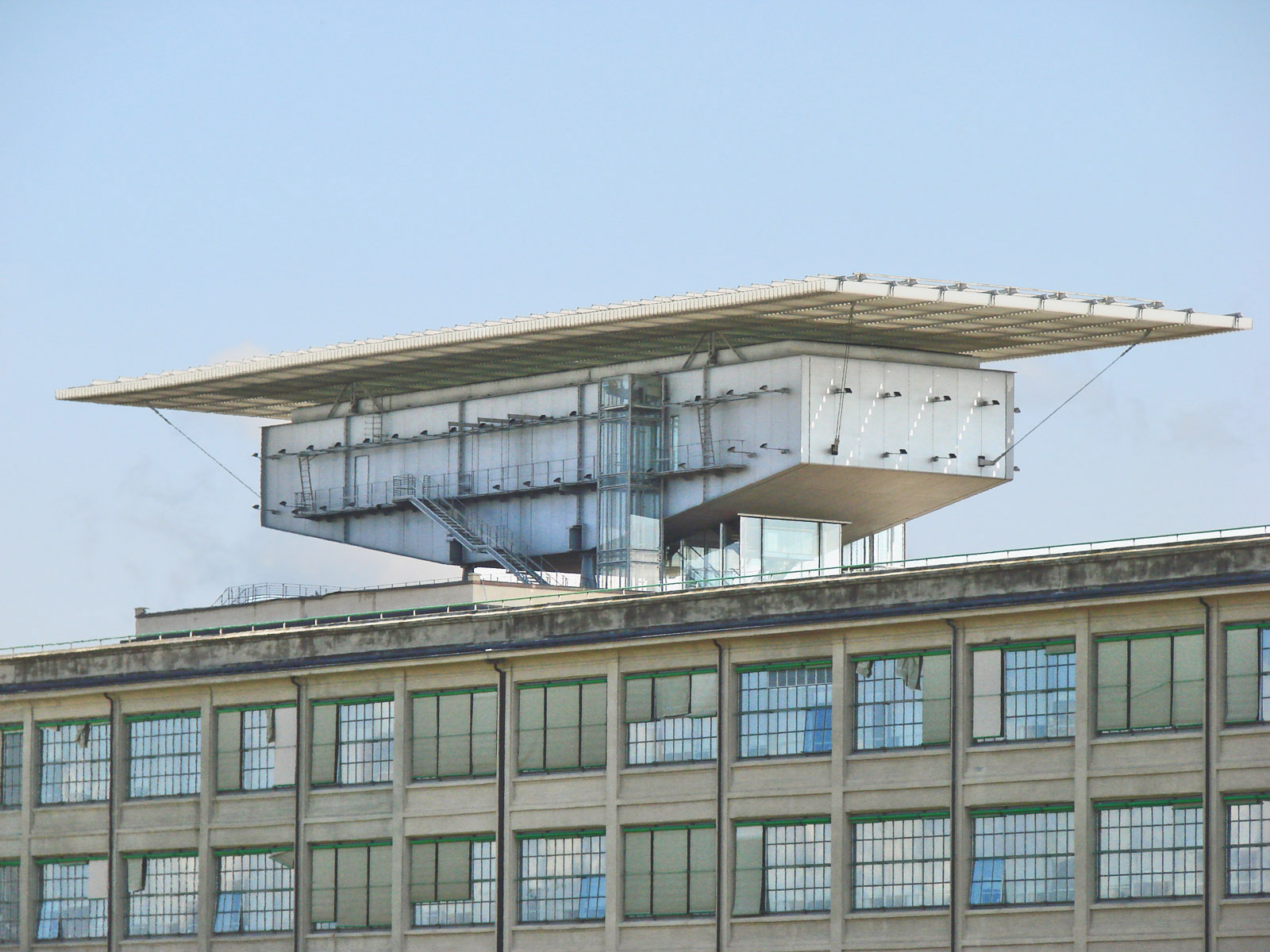
The Agnelli art museum atop the Lingotto Factory in Turin (2003)

=== Centre Pompidou (1973–1977) ===
In 1971, the thirty-four-year-old Renzo Piano and thirty-eight-year-old Richard Rogers, in collaboration with the Italian architect Gianfranco Franchini, competed with major architectural firms in the United States and Europe. They were awarded the commission for the most prestigious project in Paris: the new French national museum of 20th century art, to be located in Beaubourg. The award surprised the architectural world, as the team was relatively unknown and had no experience with museums or other major structures. The New York Times declared that their design "turned the architecture world upside down".

More literally, it turned architecture inside-out, since in the new museum, the apparent structural frame of the building and the heating and air conditioning ducts were on the exterior, painted in bright colors. The escalator, enclosed in a transparent tube, ran diagonally across the façade. The building transformed a run-down commercial area near the Marais in Paris.

The media dubbed the style of the building as "high-tech", but this was later disputed by Piano: "Beaubourg," he said, "was a joyous urban machine, a creature which might have come out of a Jules Verne novel, a sort of bizarre boat in dry dock... It is a double provocation; a challenge to academism, but also a parody of the imagery of technology of our time. To consider it as a high-tech object is a mistake."

=== Menil Collection (1981–1987) ===
In 1977, Piano ended his collaboration with Rogers and began working with engineer Peter Rice, who had contributed to the design of the Pompidou Centre. They established their offices in Genoa. One of their first projects was a plan for the rehabilitation of the old port of Otranto, transforming it from an industrial site into a commercial and tourist destination (1977).

Their first major building was the Menil Collection, an art museum commissioned by collector Dominique de Menil. Her primary requirements was to maximize the use of natural light in the interiors. Piano wrote, "Paradoxically, the Menil Collection, with its serenity, its calm, its discretion, is much more modern, scientifically speaking, than the Beaubourg."

The Menil Collection building, with its simple gray and white cubic forms, is the stylistic opposite of the Pompidou Centre. Its technological innovations are not expressed on the façade, but are embedded in discreet high-tech systems of shutters, screens, and air conditioning which allowed maximum natural light while protecting the interiors from Texas’s intense heat and sunlight.

=== Old Port of Genoa (1985–2001) and Lingotto Factory in Turin (1983–2003) ===
In the mid-1980s Piano and his firm took on a wide variety of projects, using the most advanced technology available, but, in contrast to the Pompidou Centre, as discreetly as possible. His portable pavilion for IBM (1983–1986) was an example; designed with Peter Rice, of a lightweight portable tunnel for expositions. It composed of a series of pyramids of polycarbonate supported by a wooden frame, and could be transported in a truck. It was designed to integrate the scenery outside into displays in the interior. He designed two major reconstruction projects in northern Italy; the reanimation of the old port of his native city, Genoa, and the conversion and modernization of the gigantic and historic Fiat factory in Turin, Italy. For the Fiat Lingotto factory, he preserved the enormous main structure, including its famous oval test track for automobiles on the roof, but added new structures, including a concert hall beneath the building, a heliport, and a glass domed conference center on the roof. He continued his modifications and additions over two decades; without destroying the historic core of the building. The most recent was a museum for the art collection of the Fiat head Giovanni Agnelli in an elegant glass and steel box perched on the roof, as if it were about to take off; it was nicknamed the "Flying bank vault".

Piano also carried out a large program for revitalization of the old port of Genoa to transform it from a rundown industrial area into a cultural center and tourist attraction. He prolonged streets to give access to the port, transformed old port buildings into cultural and commercial buildings, added a library, an aquarium and an auditorium, a botanical garden in glass dome and a giant multi-armed crane, modeled after the old cranes of the port, which hoists visitors high in the air for a view of the port.

In addition, he designed the new headquarters of his firm, the Renzo Piano Building Workshop (1989–1991), on a series of stepped terraces hanging over the Mediterranean to the west of the city. The building is accessed by an eight-passenger funicular railway car which shuttles up and down the hillside.

=== Paris "The Whale" Commercial Mall Bercy 2 (1990) ===
Bercy 2, nicknamed "The Whale", is a shopping mall with 70 stores and 36,000 m^{2} of retail space, located in Paris Charenton, along the banks of the River Seine and the "Périphérique" ring road.

Inaugurated on 24 April 1990, it was only the third completed building by Piano after the Centre Pompidou. The mall's distinctive design features amcyclopean wooden structure clad in 27,000 satin-finished stainless steel tiles, and pierced with oculus to let an overhead light pass, is completely innovative. Its curved form, which follows the turn of the adjacent highway ramp, evokes the shape of a large airship, hence earning the nicknames "The Zeppelin" or "The Whale".

== Projects completed 1991–2000 ==
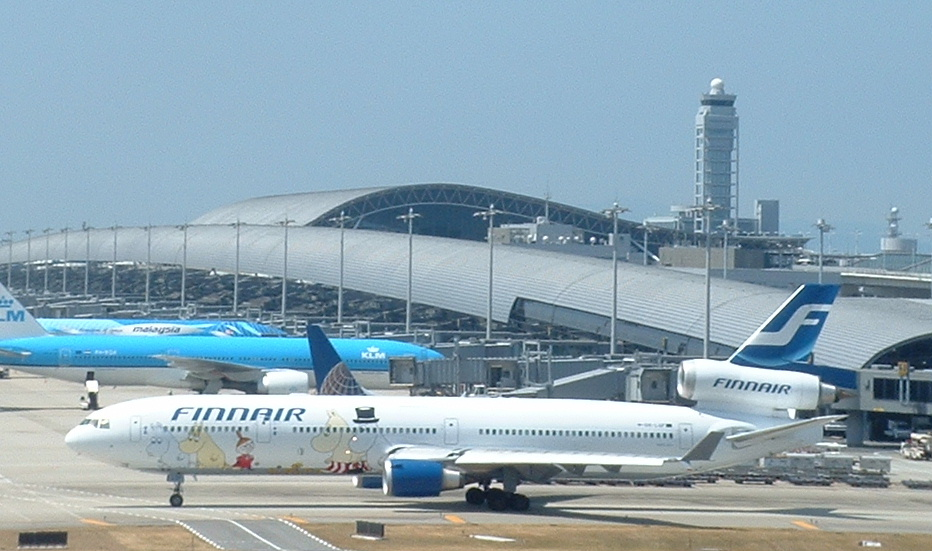
Kansai International Airport, Osaka, Japan (1991–1994)

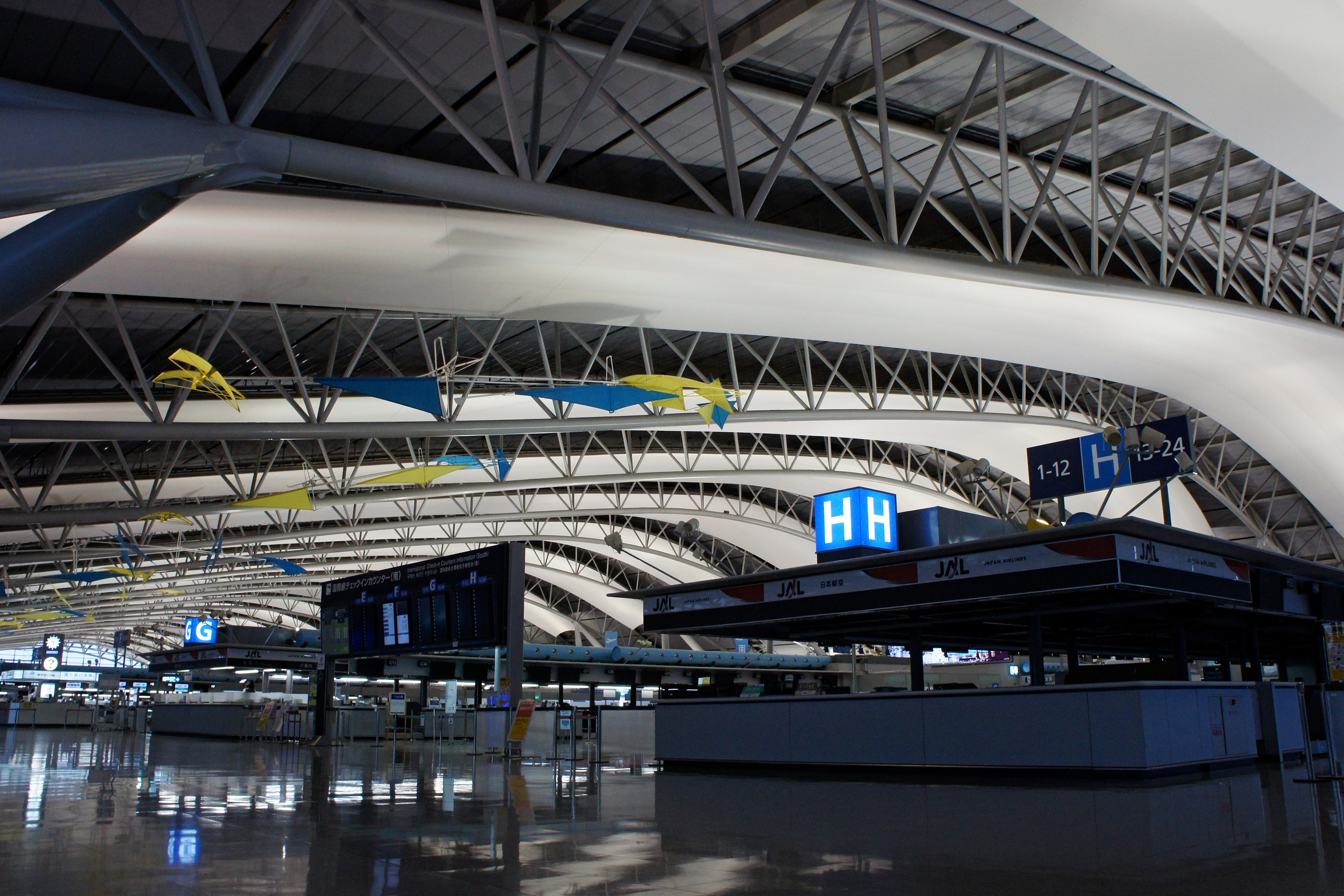
Kansai Airport interior (1991–1994)

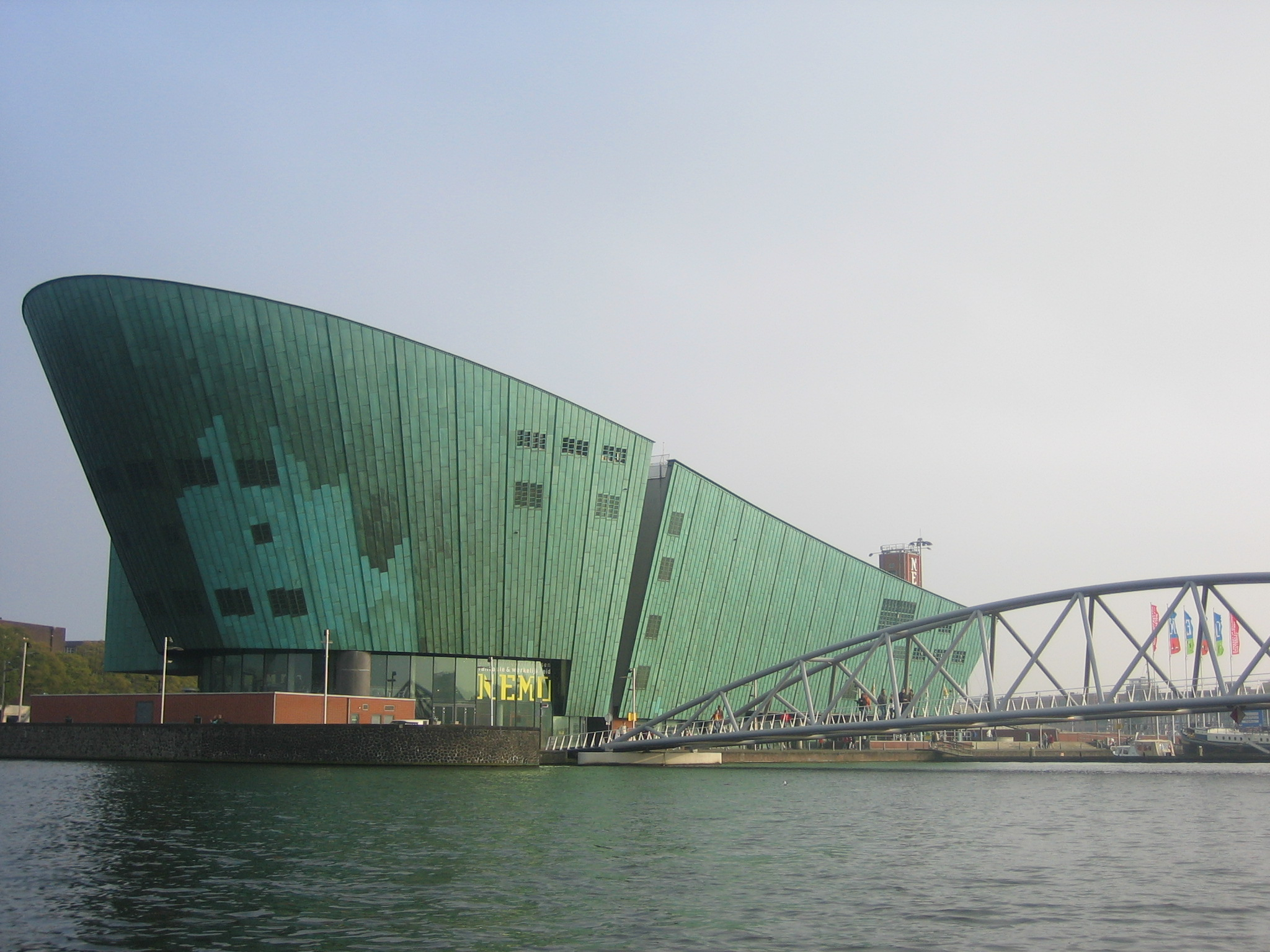
Nemo Science Centre in Amsterdam (1997)

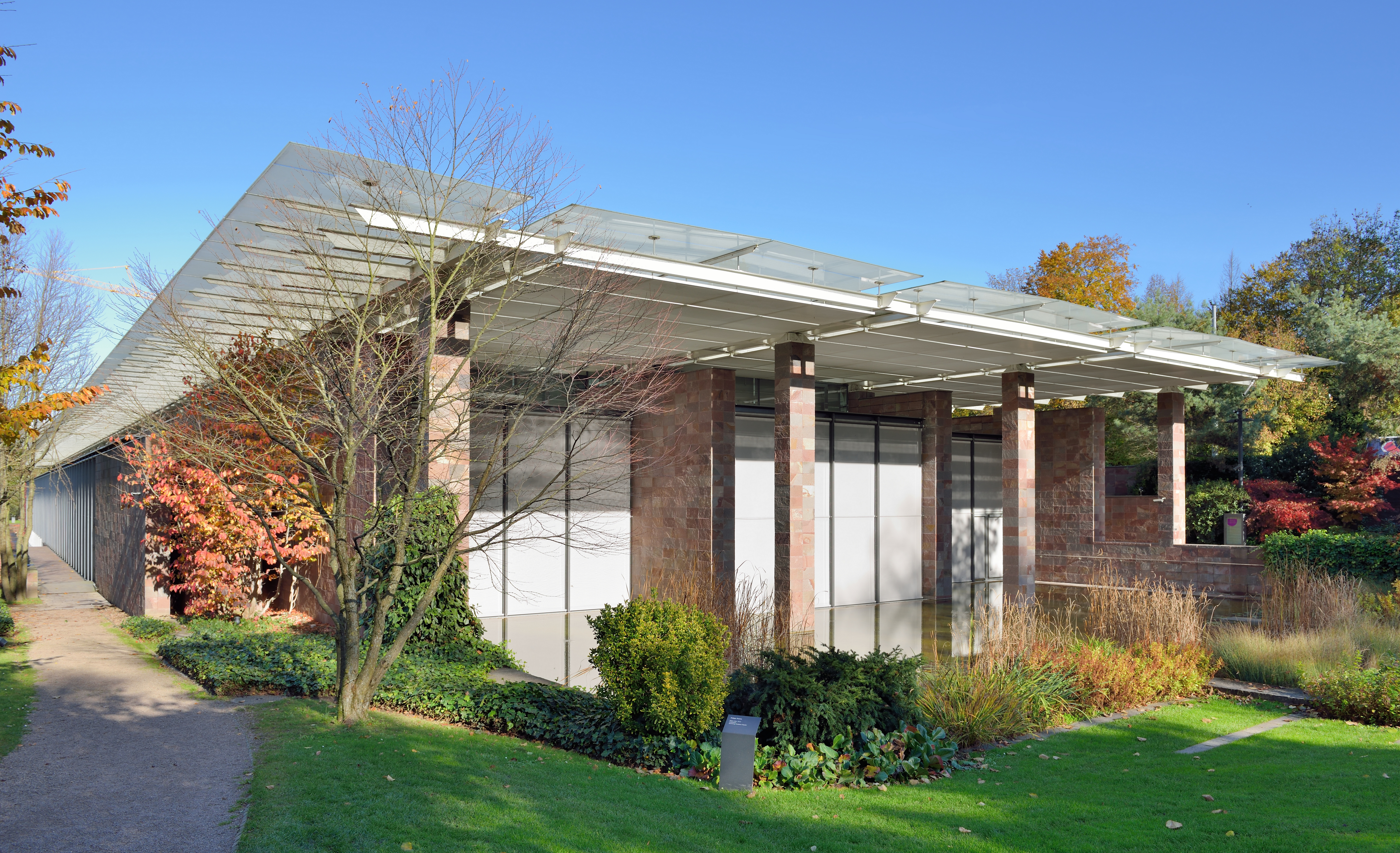
Fondation Beyeler, in Basel, Switzerland (1991–1997)

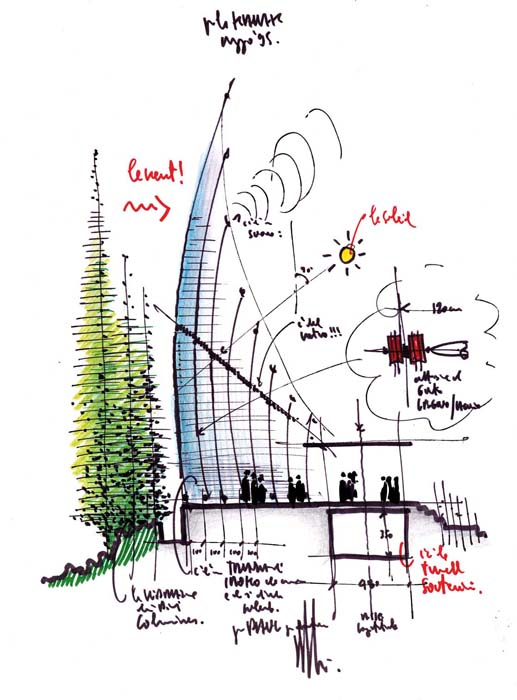
Drawing by Piano for the Jean-Marie Tjibaou Cultural Centre (1991–1998)

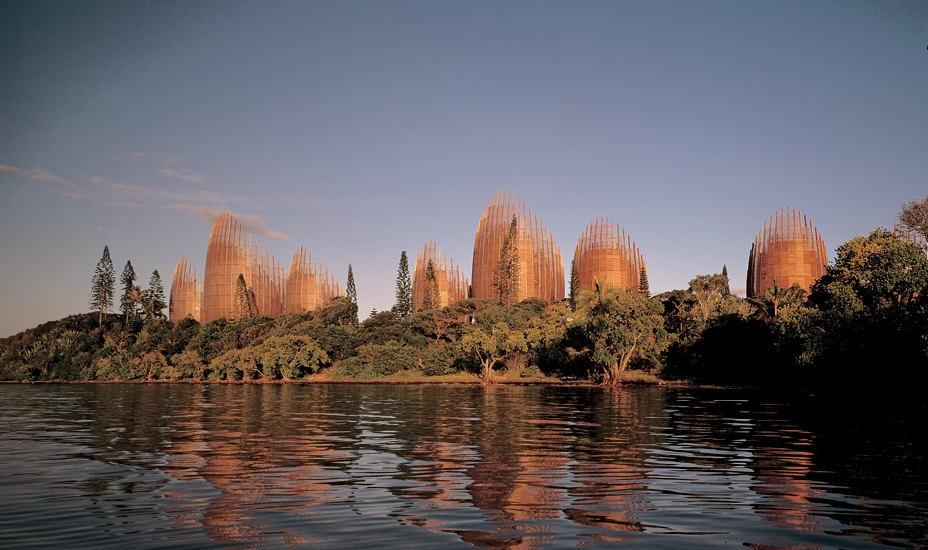
Jean-Marie Tjibaou Cultural Centre in Nouméa, New Caledonia (1991–1998)

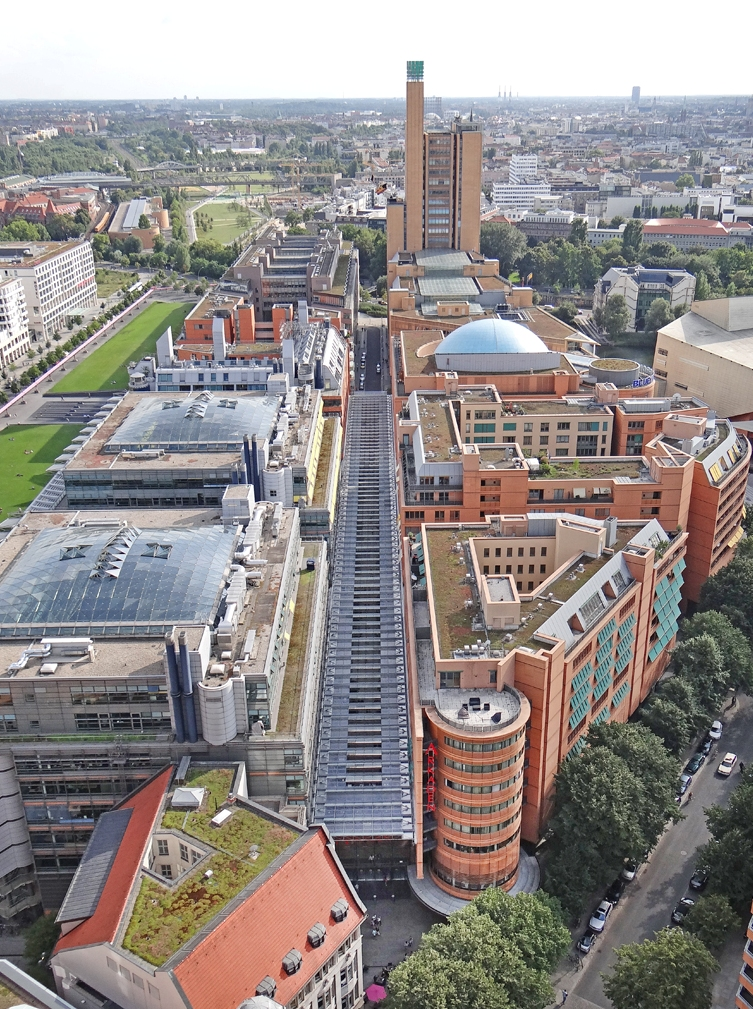
Potsdamer Platz Berlin project (Piano buildings on right)

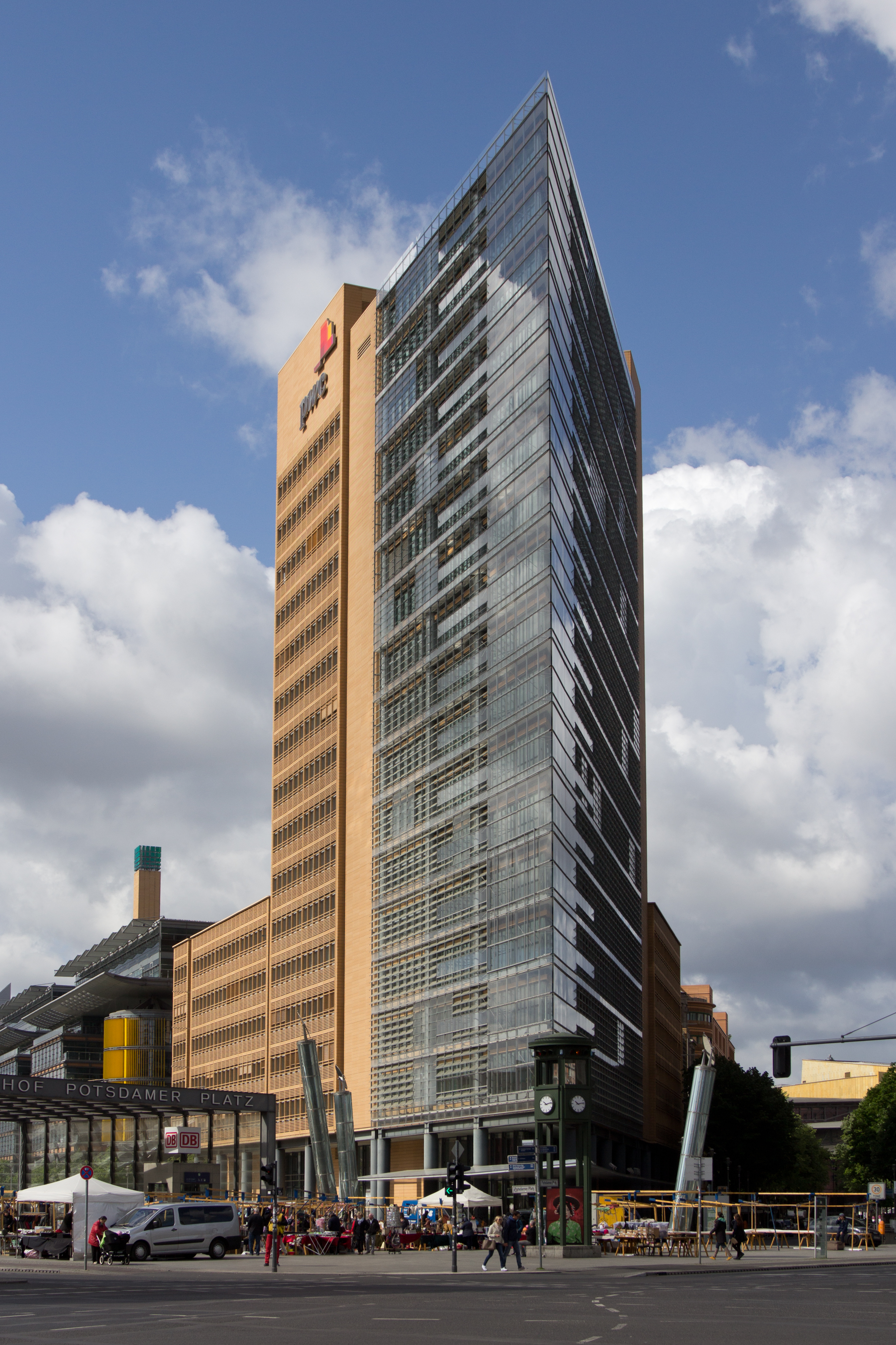
PricewaterhouseCoopers tower on Potsdamer Platz (1992–2000)

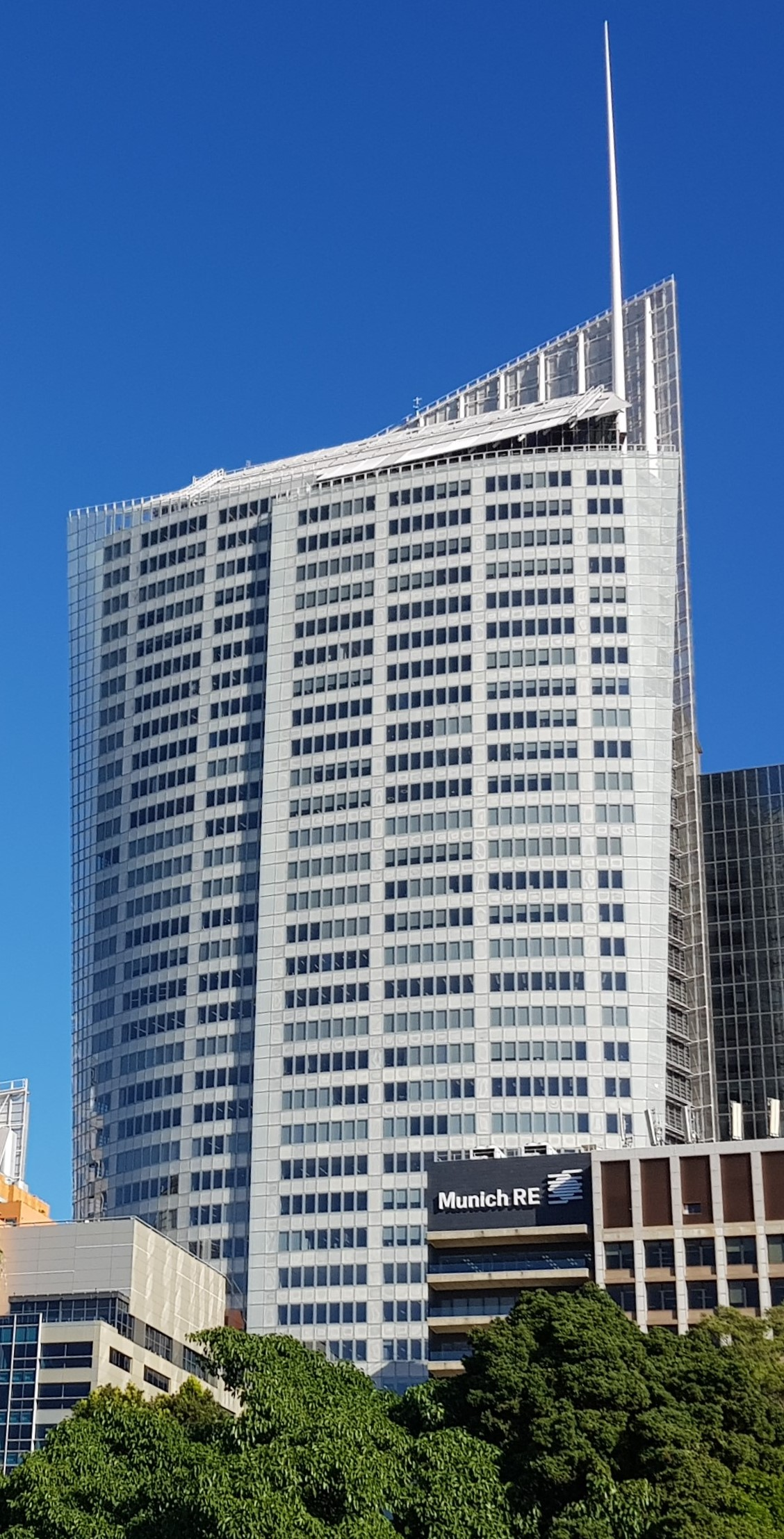
Aurora Place in Sydney (1996–2000)

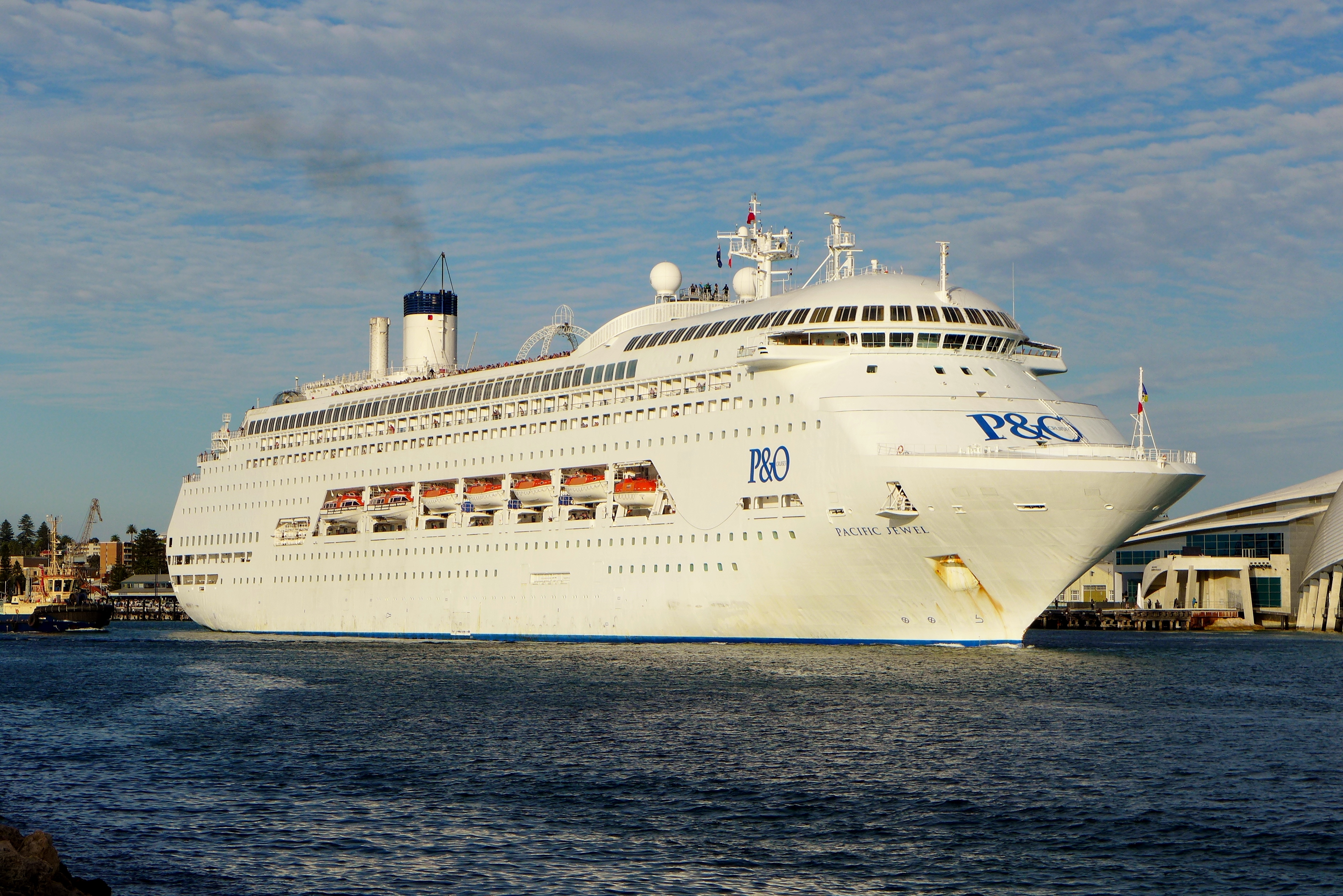
Crown Class Cruise Ships 1989-1991

=== Crown Class Cruise Ships (1989–1991) ===
In the mid-1980s Sitmar Cruises began a rigorous building schedule for the North American market. At the time one ship the Sitmar Fairmajesty was ordered for French shipyard Chantiers de l'Atlantique. The Italian government through Fincantieri would desire for the next Sitmar ships to be built in Italy. Piano was commissioned to design the ships. Piano designed the exterior of the ships to resemble a dolphin. The Crown Princess was delivered to Princess Cruises in 1990 and the Regal Princess followed a year later in 1991.

=== Kansai International Airport (1991–1994) ===
In 1988 Piano and Rice won an international competition for a new airport to be constructed on an artificial island in the port of Osaka, Japan. The main terminal he designed was extremely long (1.7 kilometres [1.1 mi]), with a very low profile, so that the controllers in the control tower could always see the aircraft on the runways. The frequent earthquakes in the Japanese islands required special building techniques; the structure is mounted on hydraulic joints which adjust to movements of the earth. The long, curving roof is covered with 82,000 panels of stainless steel, which reflect the sunlight, and is supported by arches 83 metres (272 ft) long, which give a feeling of openness.

=== Fondation Beyeler (1991–1997) ===
The Fondation Beyeler is a private art museum in Riehen, near Basel, Switzerland, built for the art collection of Ernst Beyeler. Although it opened in the same year as the Guggenheim Bilbao of Frank Gehry, in spirit it was exactly the opposite. It was designed, at the request of the founder, to inspire tranquility, with white walls, light-colored wooden floors, and natural light. The wall separating the museum from the neighboring road constructed of porphyry stone from Patagonia. also used in different parts of the Museum.

=== Jean-Marie Tjibaou Cultural Centre, Noumea, New Caledonia (1991–1998) ===
The Jean-Marie Tjibaou Cultural Centre in Nouméa, New Caledonia (1991–1998), is among the most unusual of Piano's works. A joint project between New Caledonia and the French government, it is designed to display the culture of the Kanak people. The project uses a combination of traditional and modern material; local wood, along with glass and aluminum. The complex is located on a narrow peninsula in a lagoon with prevailing winds. Piano designed a series of curved wooden screens, from 9 to 28 metres (30 to 92 ft) high, to protect the exposition structures, then three "villages" of structures; one for welcome and exhibitions space; one for an auditorium and media center; and one for service functions. The curving wooden pavilions, inspired in form by the local architecture, have a double wooden skin to protect against the weather, but also let in the sunlight. While it is devoted to the local culture, some of the buildings, particularly the towering reception center, with curving walls and wooden spires, are strikingly post-modern in form.

His other projects begun in the 1990s included the New Metropolis Museum in Amsterdam, which later became the science museum and technology NEMO (1992–1997), placed on the edge of the harbor, and resembling the hull of an enormous ship; the Parco della Musica, a complex of music performance halls in Rome (1994–2002), Each was entirely different from the others, and in this period it was difficult to discern a specific element that or style defined his architecture, other than careful craftsmanship and attention to detail.

=== Potsdamer Platz, Berlin (1992–2000) ===
Potsdamer Platz is a historic triangle in the heart of Berlin Germany, which had been largely destroyed during World War II, and then divided by the Berlin Wall between East and West Berlin. When a major reconstruction was commenced in 1990, Piano was selected to design the new buildings on five of the fifteen sites of the project, with the requirement that the buildings have roofs of copper, and facades of clear glass and materials of a baked earth color. Other architects engaged in the enormous project included Rafael Moneo, Arata Isozaki, and his former partner, Richard Rogers. The centerpiece of Piano's part of the project was the Debis building, composed of four different buildings of different sizes but in the same style. Distinctive elements include an atrium 28 metres (92 ft) high, and a 21-story tower whose east, south and west facades are covered with double walls of glass separated by 28 cm (11 in), which reduced the need for air conditioning and heating. The complex also included an IMAX movie theater, restaurant and shops. The 36-metre (118 ft) dome of the IMAX theater was visible from a distance and also from the street, through the clear glass of the facade. Piano wrote in The Disobedience of the Architect (2004) that he tried to match his architecture to the personality of a city. "The Berliners are accustomed to living outdoors, and to a certain form of conviviality." The new Potsdamer Platz was designed to capture the Berliner's "sense of gaiety, their sense of humor....Why should a city be demoralizing? The beautiful thing about a city is that it is a place of meetings and surprises."

=== Aurora Place, Sydney, Australia (1996–2000) ===
Aurora Place in Sydney, Australia (1996–2009) is composed of two towers, an eighteen-story residential building next to a forty-one story office building with different facades but similar metal and glass sunscreens on the roofs. The lower tower was an early example of the luxury high-rise residential buildings by star architects in the center large cities which became very popular in the early 21st century. The office tower has a discreetly peculiar form; the east façade bulges out slightly from its base, reaching its maximum width at the top floors. The curved and twisted shape of east the façade echoes that of the Sydney Opera House on the harbor. The exterior glass curtain-wall extends beyond the main frame, creating an illusion that the wall is independent of the building. of its Glass shutters on the exterior can be opened for ventilation, and Piano designed an exterior skin combining glass and ceramics to regulate the intensity of the sunlight. The office building has interior winter gardens on each floor, and earth-colored ceramic tiles give a dash of color to the facade.

== Projects completed 2001–2009 ==
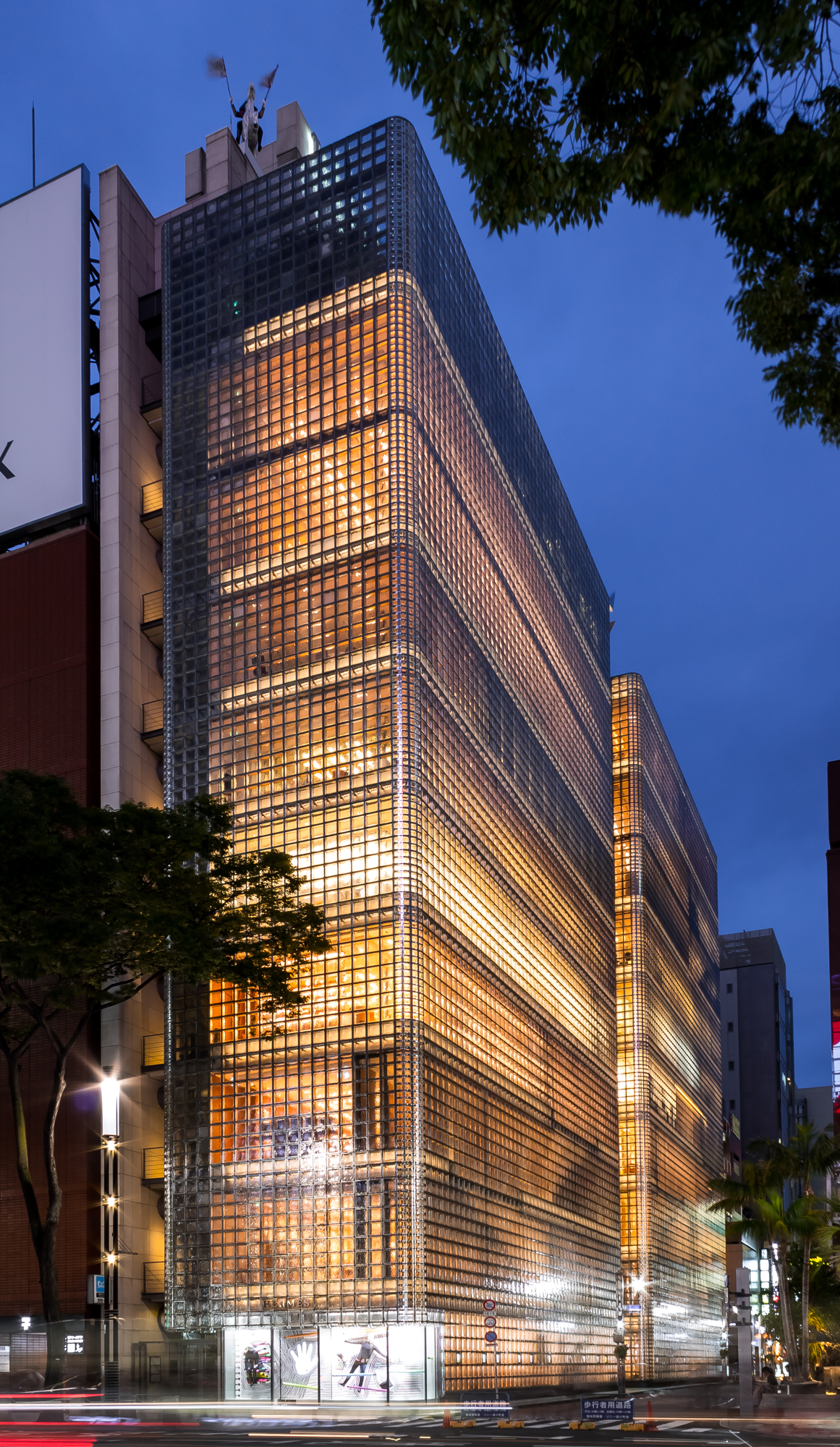
Maison Hermès in Ginza, Tokyo, Japan (1998–2001)

Auditorium of the Parco della Musica, Rome (1994–2002)

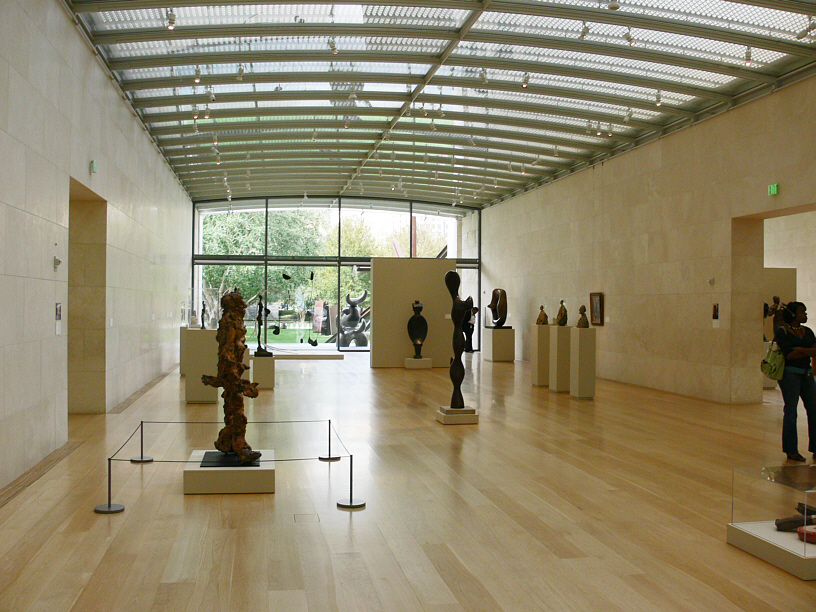
Nasher Sculpture Center in Dallas, Texas (1999–2003)

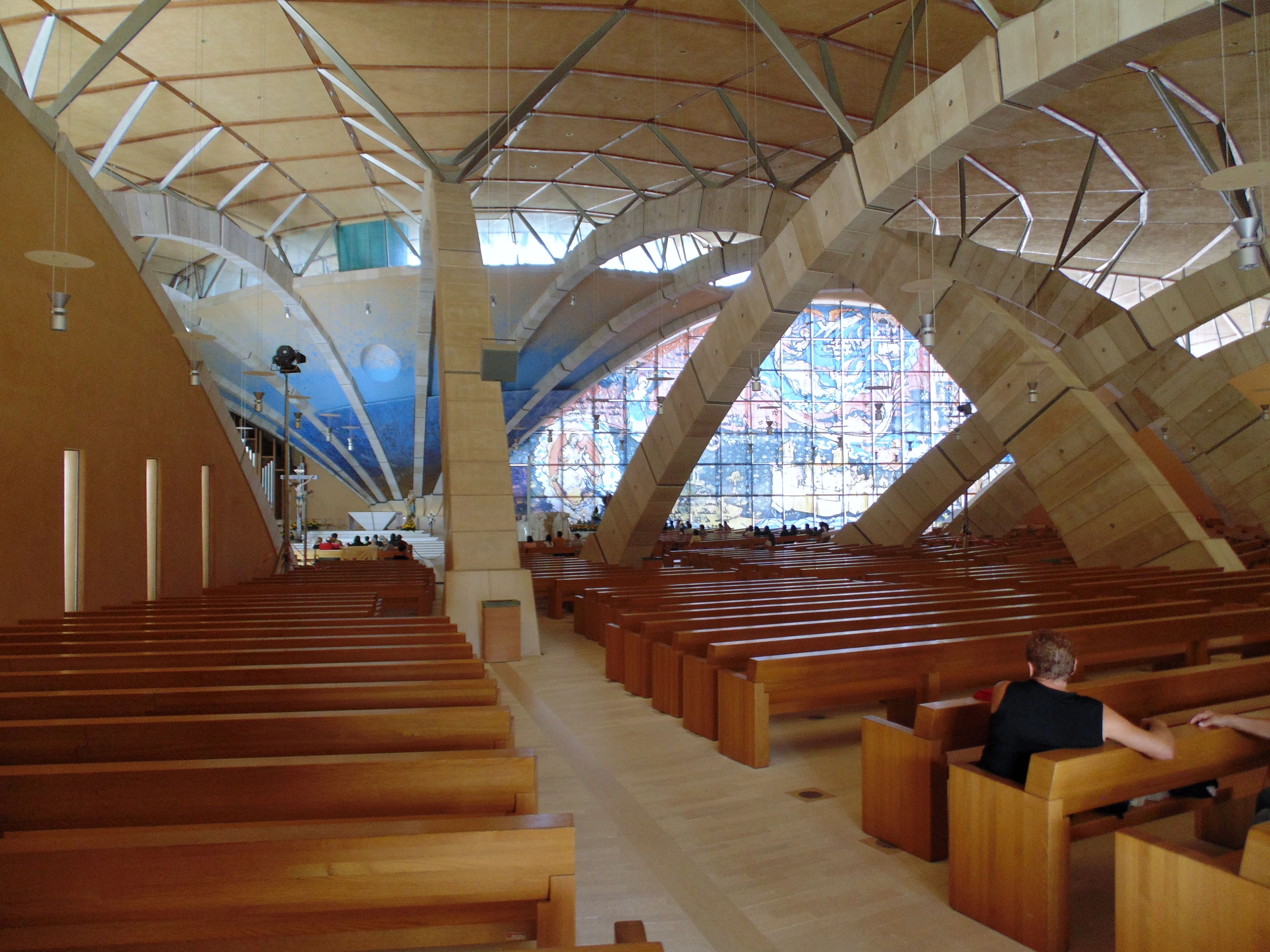
Sanctuary of Saint Pio of Pietrelcina

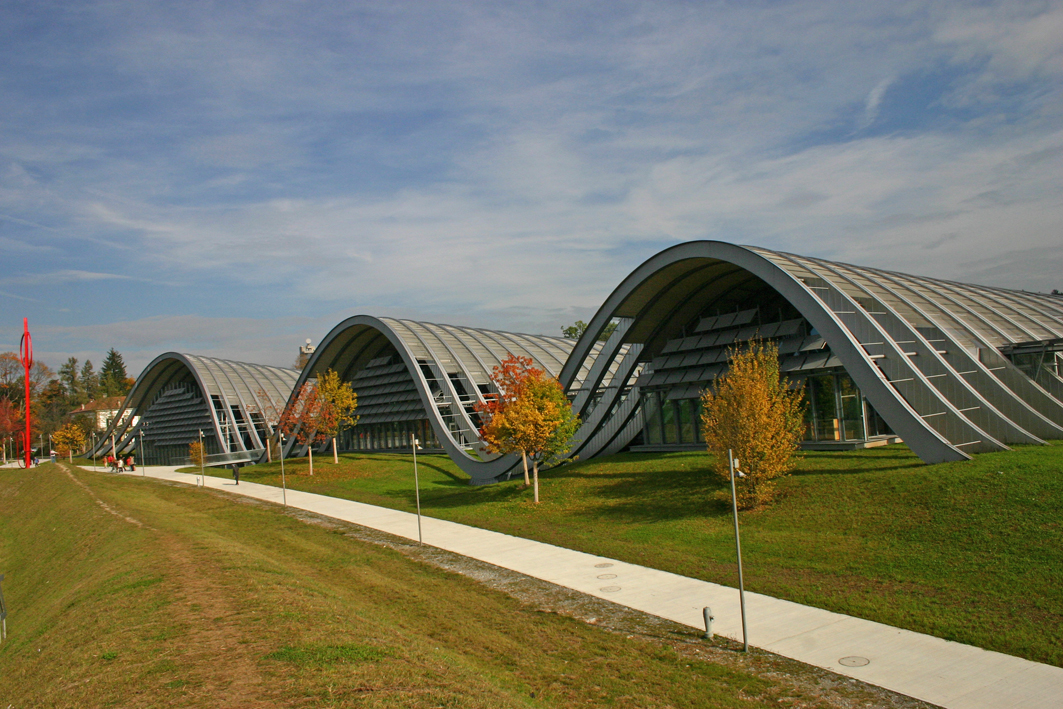
Zentrum Paul Klee in Bern, Switzerland (1999–2005)

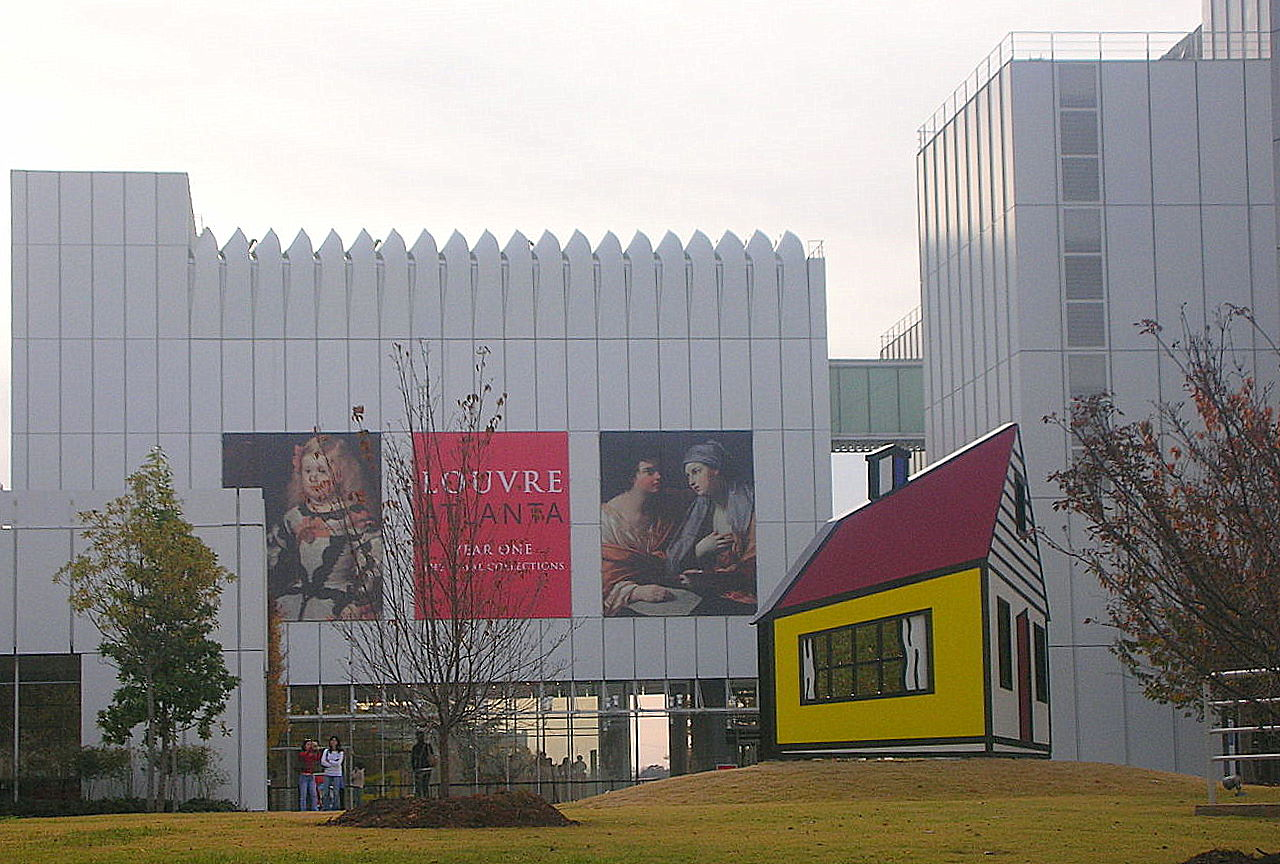
Extension of the High Museum of Art in Atlanta (1999–2005)

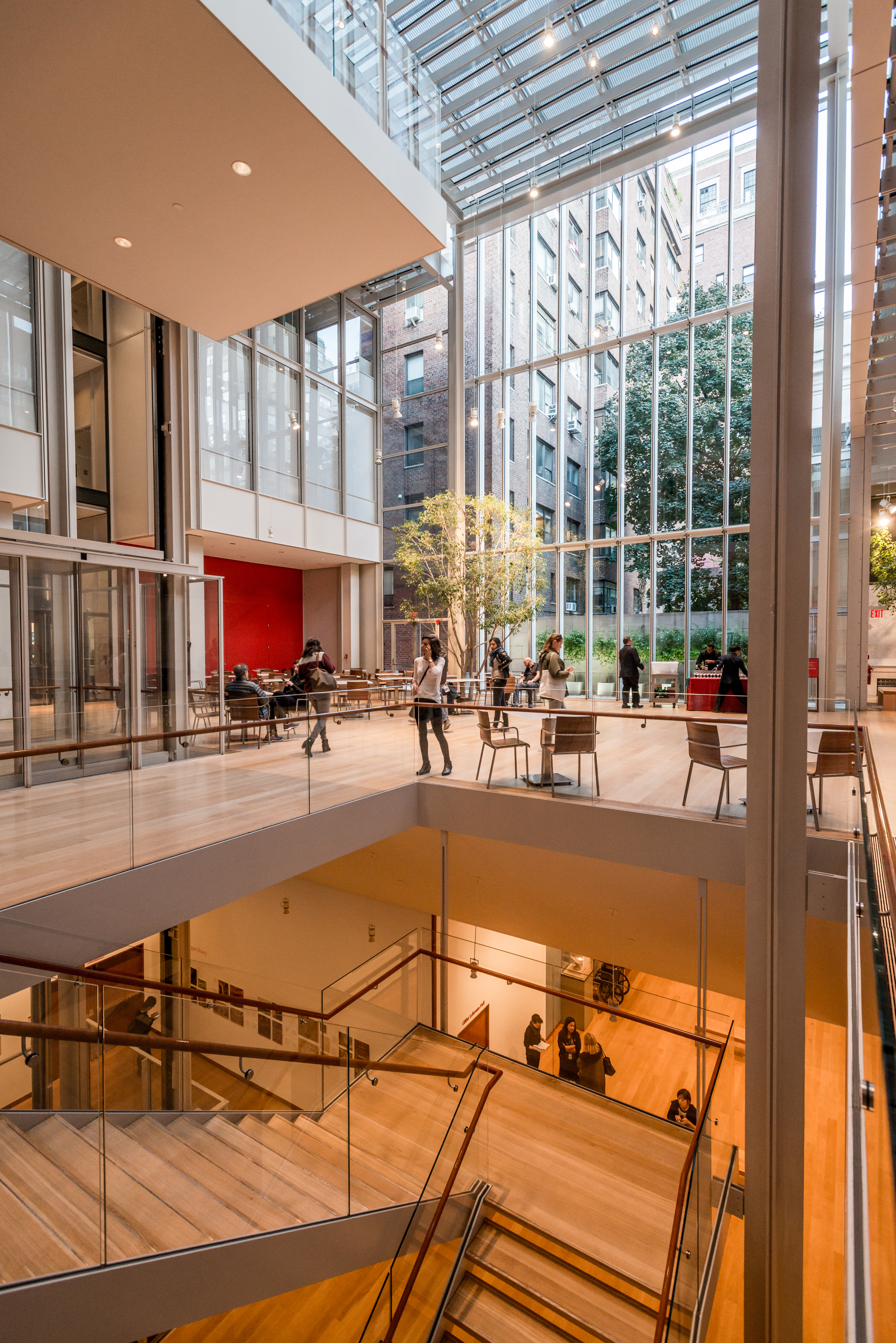
Extension to the Morgan Library in New York City (2000–2006)

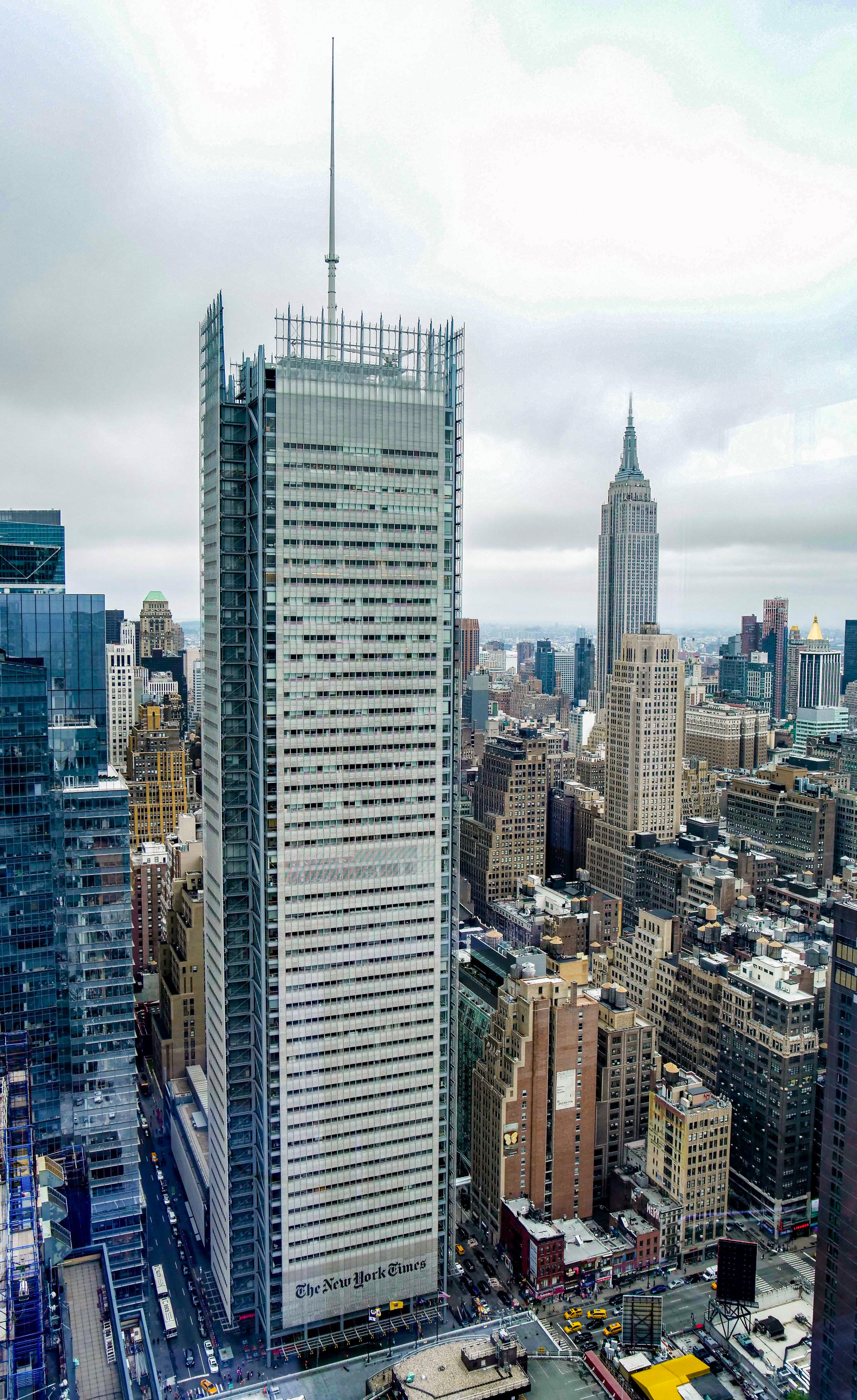
The New York Times Building in New York City (2000–2007)

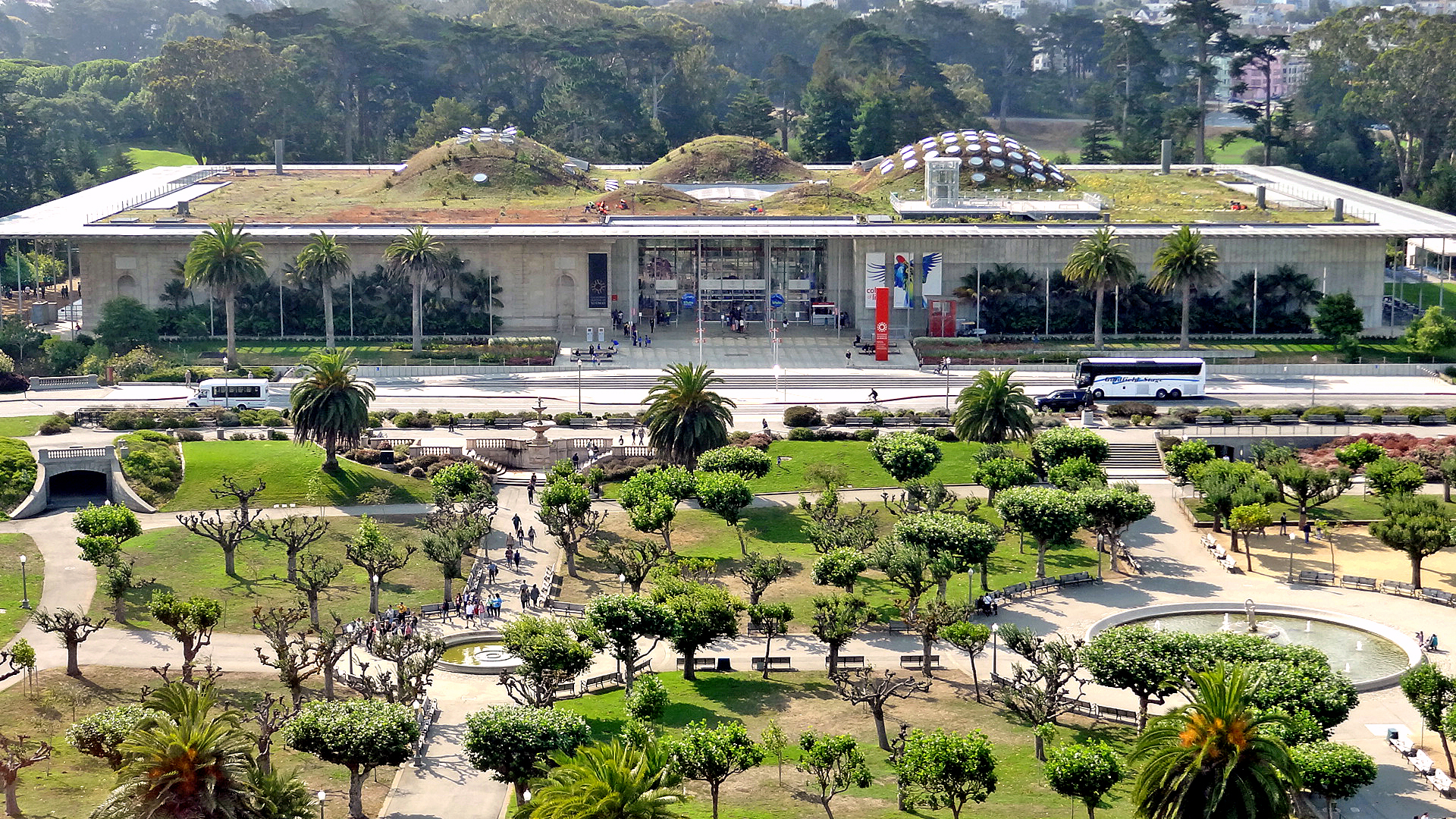
California Academy of Sciences in San Francisco (2000–2008)

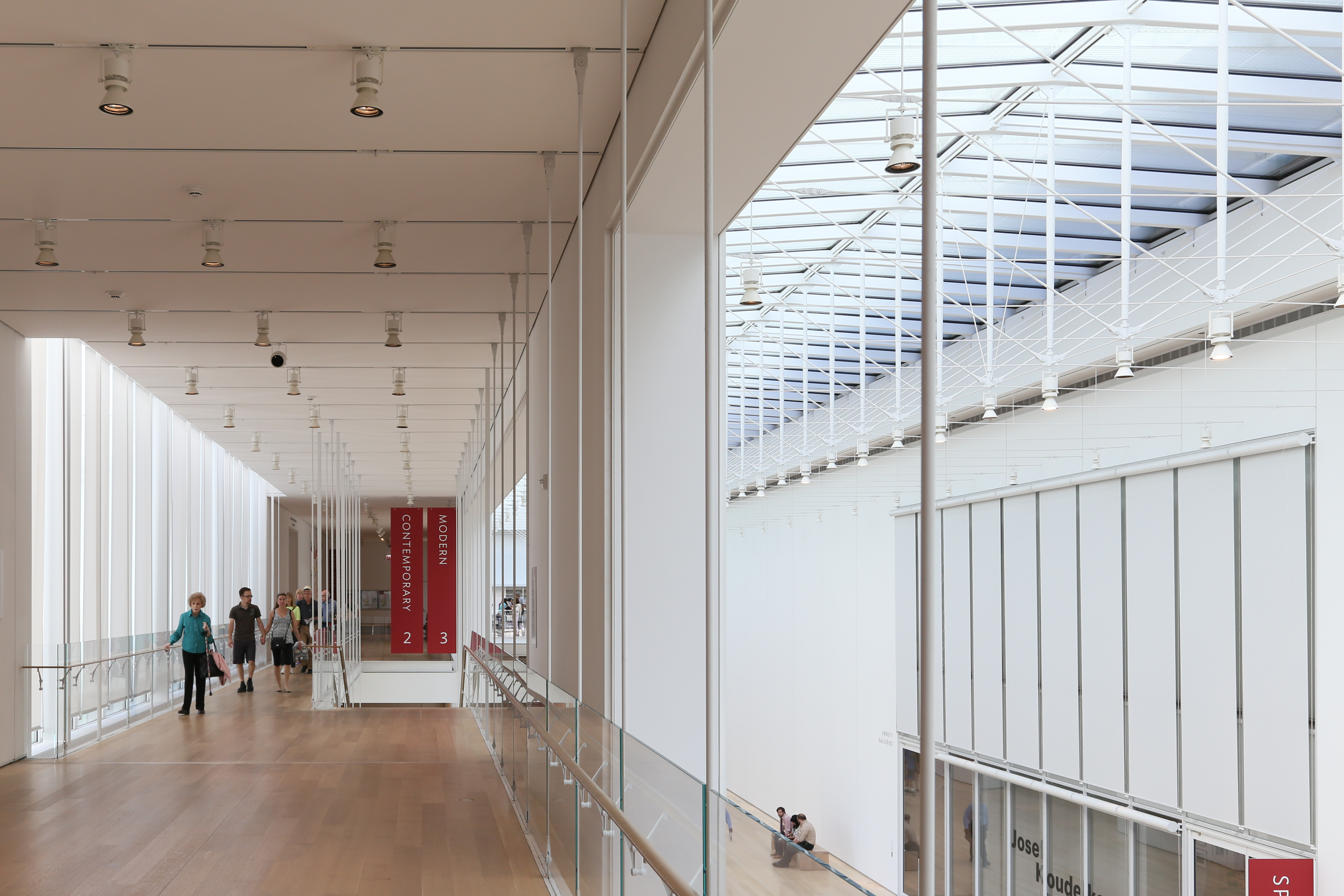
Modern wing of the Art Institute of Chicago (2000–2009)

=== Auditorium Niccolò Paganini (1997–2001) ===
The Auditorium Niccolò Paganini is a concert hall constructed inside a former sugar mill in the historic center of the city of Parma, Italy. The theater has 780 seats placed on a slope for maximum visibility of the stage. Piano retained the original exterior walls of the main building, but removed the transversal interior walls and replaced them with glass walls, so the entire interior is visible from the outside, and those inside can see the park outside the theater.

=== Maison Hermès (1998–2001) ===
The Maison Hermès in the Ginza commercial district of Tokyo is the flagship store in Japan of the French luxury brand. The building is ten stories high, with three floors underground, and includes space for expositions and for a small museum on the history of the firm. The building is highly geometrical; precisely 44.55 metres (146.2 ft) high, with a facade composed of 13,000 pieces of glass each exactly 45 by 45 centimetres (18 by 18 in). The panels of glass were made in Florence, Italy, and placed in supports made in Switzerland, for assembly in Japan. Each piece of the facade is designed to be able to move four millimetres (3/16 in) to resist earthquakes. When illuminated a night, the building is intended to resemble a "magic lantern".

=== Auditorium of the Parco della Musica (1994–2002) ===
The Parco della Musica is the complex of music venues located in the Rome neighborhood which hosted the 1960 Summer Olympics. The park has three theaters, the largest with 2800 seats; when completed it was the largest symphonic concert hall in Europe. Piano acknowledged that his inspiration for the interior plan was the vineyard style seating, placed around the orchestra, of the Berlin Philharmonic by Hans Sharon. The three brick concert halls covered with what New York Times critic Sam Lubell described as "weathered armadillo-like steel shells," which looked forbidding in photographs but in person were "lovely"; and noted that the theaters "inside are heavy with wood, fabrics, and typical Piano elegance." He called the whole complex "deceptively simple but smart.".

=== Nasher Sculpture Center (1999–2003) ===
In the first decade of the 21st century, a wave of new art museums or museum wings were built to house the collections of wealthy art patrons. Piano, who had been building art museums since 1977, was one of the most active and creative designers of these new buildings; though the requirements and the collections were often similar, he usually succeeded in giving each museum a distinct look and personality. The Nasher Sculpture Center in Dallas, Texas, was funded with 60 million dollars by Raymond Nasher, who had made a fortune in developing shopping centers, to display his collection of modern sculpture, which includes works by Auguste Rodin, Joan Miró, Henri Matisse and Alberto Giacometti. The building is very simple in form, like his early Menil Collection in Houston, Texas, and does not distract from the sculptures within; six walls of travertine marble with a glass ceiling that filters the light define five long galleries, while outside a sunken sculpture garden is placed four to five metres (13 to 16 ft) below the street level, away sheltered from noise giving the appearance of an overgrown archeological excavation.

=== Zentrum Paul Klee (1999–2005) ===
The Zentrum Paul Klee near Bern, Switzerland (1999–2005), continued his series of art museums each very different from the others. It was designed in large part to protect the fragile drawings of Paul Klee from sunlight. It housed in a series galleries resembling rolling hills in the Swiss countryside. Piano explained that the shape of the galleries was inspired by naval architecture and the hulls of ships, which were adapted to the form of waves as his building was adapted to the landscape.

=== High Museum of Art Extension (1999–2005) ===
The original building of the High Museum of Art in Atlanta, Georgia, designed by Richard Meier, and inspired by the form of the Guggenheim Museum in New York City of Frank Lloyd Wright, opened in 1983. Piano's project added four new structures; a pavilion for exhibitions, a gallery for special collections, a building for offices, and a residence hall for the Atlanta College Of Art, creating 16,000 m^{2} (170,000 sq ft) of additional space. Both the new building and the original building are a gleaming white. A glass bridge with two levels connects the main pavilion with the original part of the museum. The careful management of external light is a particular feature of Piano's buildings; the High Museum Extension rows of curving fan-shaped panels on the facade and on the interior ceiling with filter the sunlight. From the parvis on the outside, the white facade gives the impression that the building has no weight at all.

=== Morgan Library Renovation and Extension (2000–2006) ===
The extension of the Morgan Library in New York City is next to the original library, a monument of Beaux-Arts architecture designed by McKim, Mead & White (1903), which had been expanded several times. Piano extensively renovated the existing structures and a built a new building the same height as the historic building, with a simple rectangular facade that complemented it. He also added a five-metre (16 ft) cube as a small exhibit space, an underground auditorium with 199 seats, and a glass-walled atrium which united all the parts, old and new. The architecture critic of the New York Times, Nicolai Ouroussoff, wrote, "the result is a space with the weight of history and the lightness of clouds...a sublime expression of the architect's preoccupation with light."

=== New York Times Building (2000–2007) ===
Piano's design for the New York Times Building was chosen after competition whose entrants included projects by Norman Foster, Frank Gehry and Cesar Pelli. The competition rules asked for a building that be as open and transparent as possible, to symbolize the connection between the newspaper and the city. The first six floors are occupied by an atrium with restaurants, shops and a conference center. The distinctive Piano feature of the tower is the clear glass curtain wall outside the facade, and rising higher than the facade itself. The curtain is composed of clear glass and a frame of ceramic tubes suspended 61 cm (24 in) from the facade; it serves as a sunscreen, eliminating the need for tinted or sintered glass.

=== California Academy of Sciences renovation and extension, San Francisco (2000–2008) ===
In 1989, after their old museum buildings were damaged by an earthquake, the trustees of the California Academy of Sciences decided to rebuild their entire complex of twelve buildings, including an aquarium, planetarium, and a museum of Natural History, located in Golden Gate Park in San Francisco. Piano's plan called for "a group of volumes under a single roof, a little like a village." The roof itself, 1.5 hectares in area, was covered with vegetation, and blends with the surrounding park. The facade of the building also harmonizes smoothly with the nearby turn-of-the-century greenhouse that is a landmark of the Park. Three cupolas resemble shallow hills across the roof, pierced by round portholes to admit natural light; they contain the entry hall, a botanical garden, and a planetarium. Piano's design for the new building was described by the New York Times as a "comforting reminder of the civilizing function of great art in a barbaric age".

=== Modern wing of the Art Institute of Chicago (2000–2009) ===
In 2000 the City of Chicago launched a major program of cultural buildings in Millennium Park with a new concert hall by Frank Gehry and a new wing of the beaux-arts building Art Institute of Chicago. With its construction of glass, steel and white stone, the new wing is carefully harmonized with the old structure, and, like his other art museums, makes maximum use of natural light. A horizontal sunscreen on the roof, nicknamed the "flying carpet", is a graceful update of his rooftop art museum on the Lingotto factory in Turin. He also designed a minimalist 620-foot (190 m) steel bridge connecting the sculpture terrace of the museum to Millennium Park. Nikolai Ouroussof, critic of the New York Times, noted that some aspects of the building recalled the work of Ludwig Mies van der Rohe, who had made much of his career in Chicago. "The taut forms and refined details, the elevation of an industrial aesthetic to an art form all are hallmarks of Mies's work." But he noted particularly Piano's masterful control of light within the building: "...it is the light that most people will notice.... The glass roof of the top-floor galleries is supported on delicate steel trusses. Rows of white blades rest on top of the trusses to filter out strong southern light; thin fabric panels soften the view from below... On a clear afternoon you can catch faint glimpses through the structural frame of clouds drifting by overhead. But most of the time the art takes center stage, everything else fading quietly into the background It is this obsessive refinement that raises Mr. Piano's best architecture to the level of art."

== Projects completed 2010 to present ==
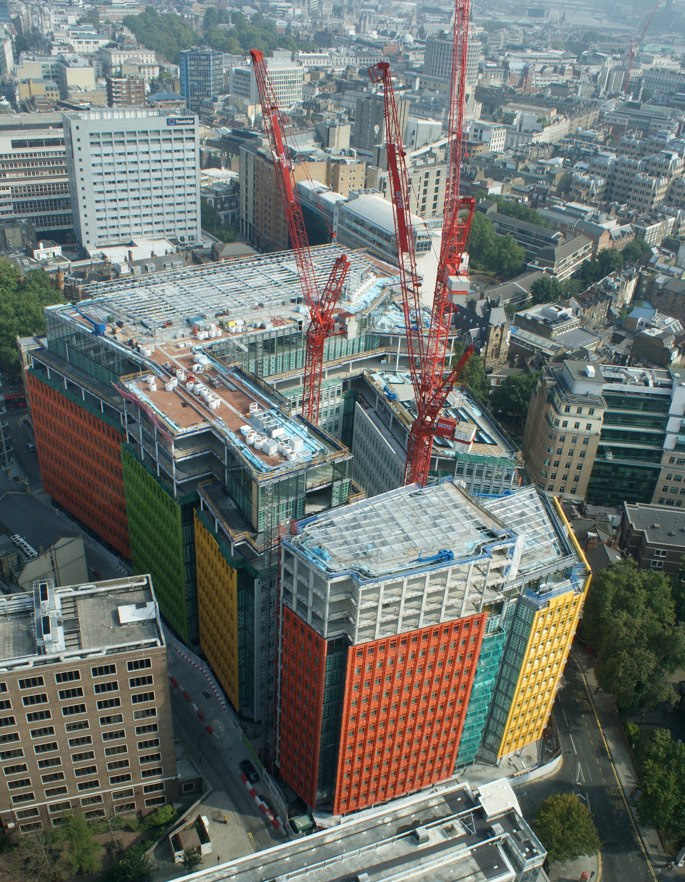
Central Saint Giles, London, under construction (2002–2010)

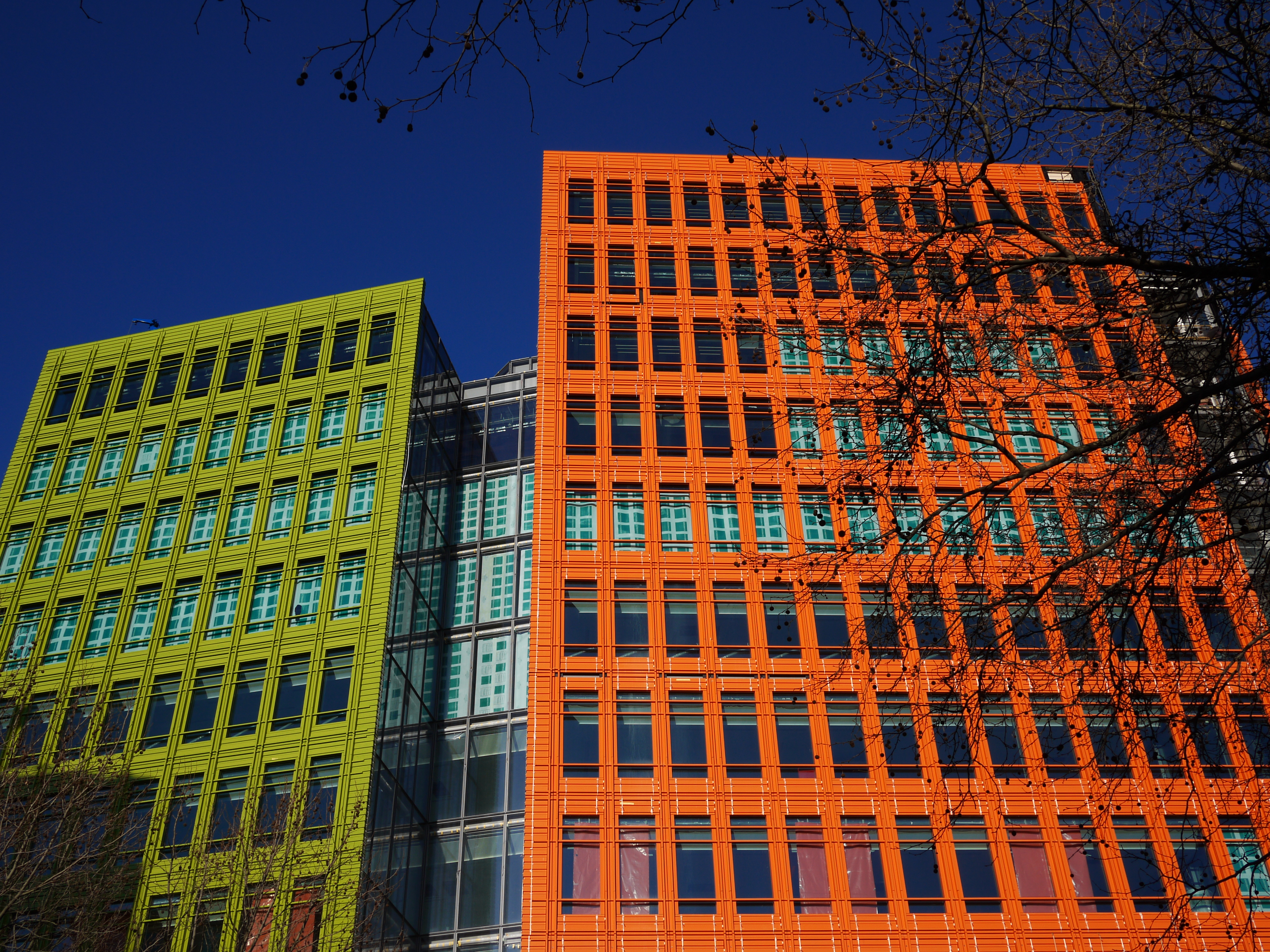
Central Saint Giles, London (2002–2010)

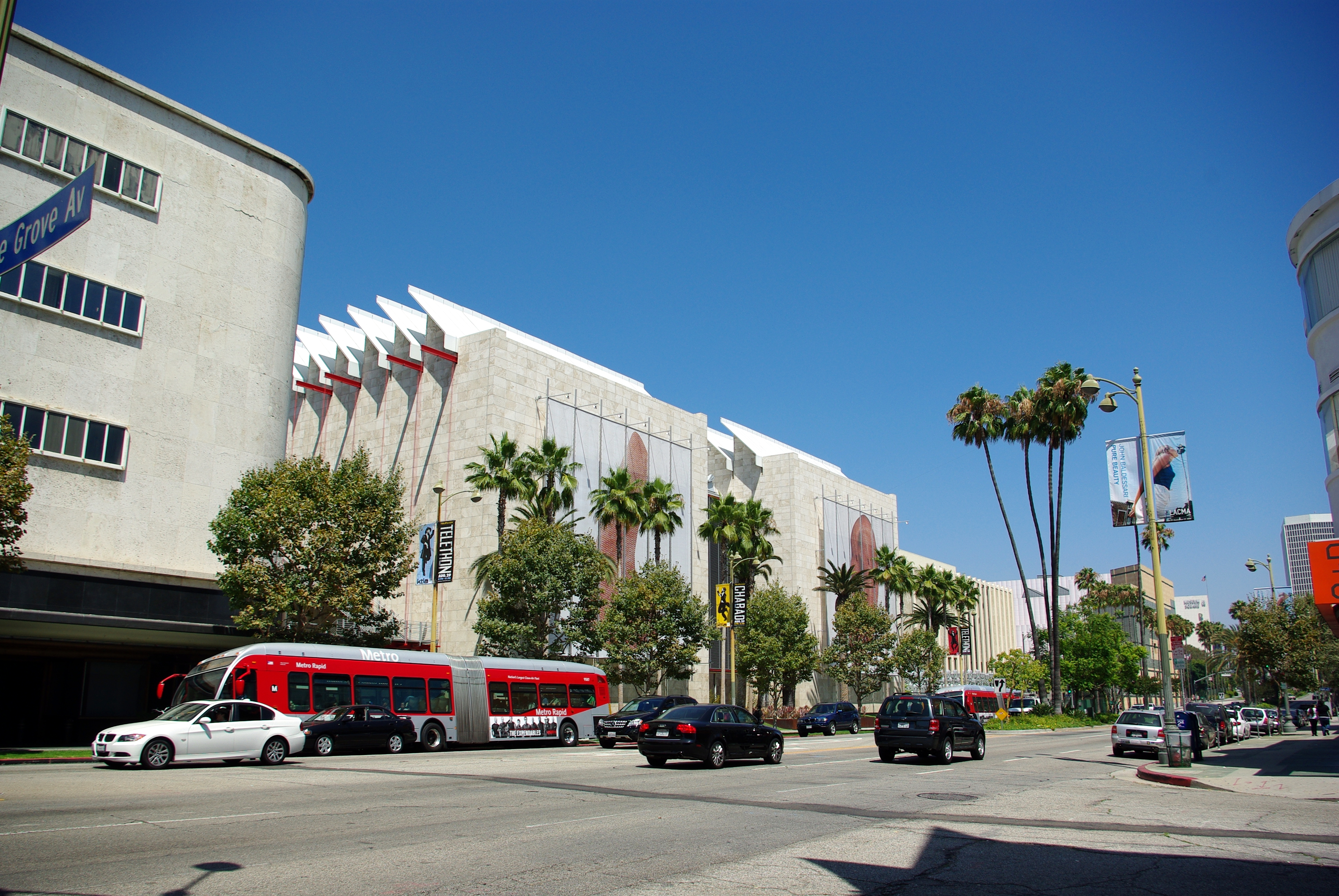
The Los Angeles County Museum of Art (BCAM & Resnick Pavilion), Los Angeles, California (2003–2010)

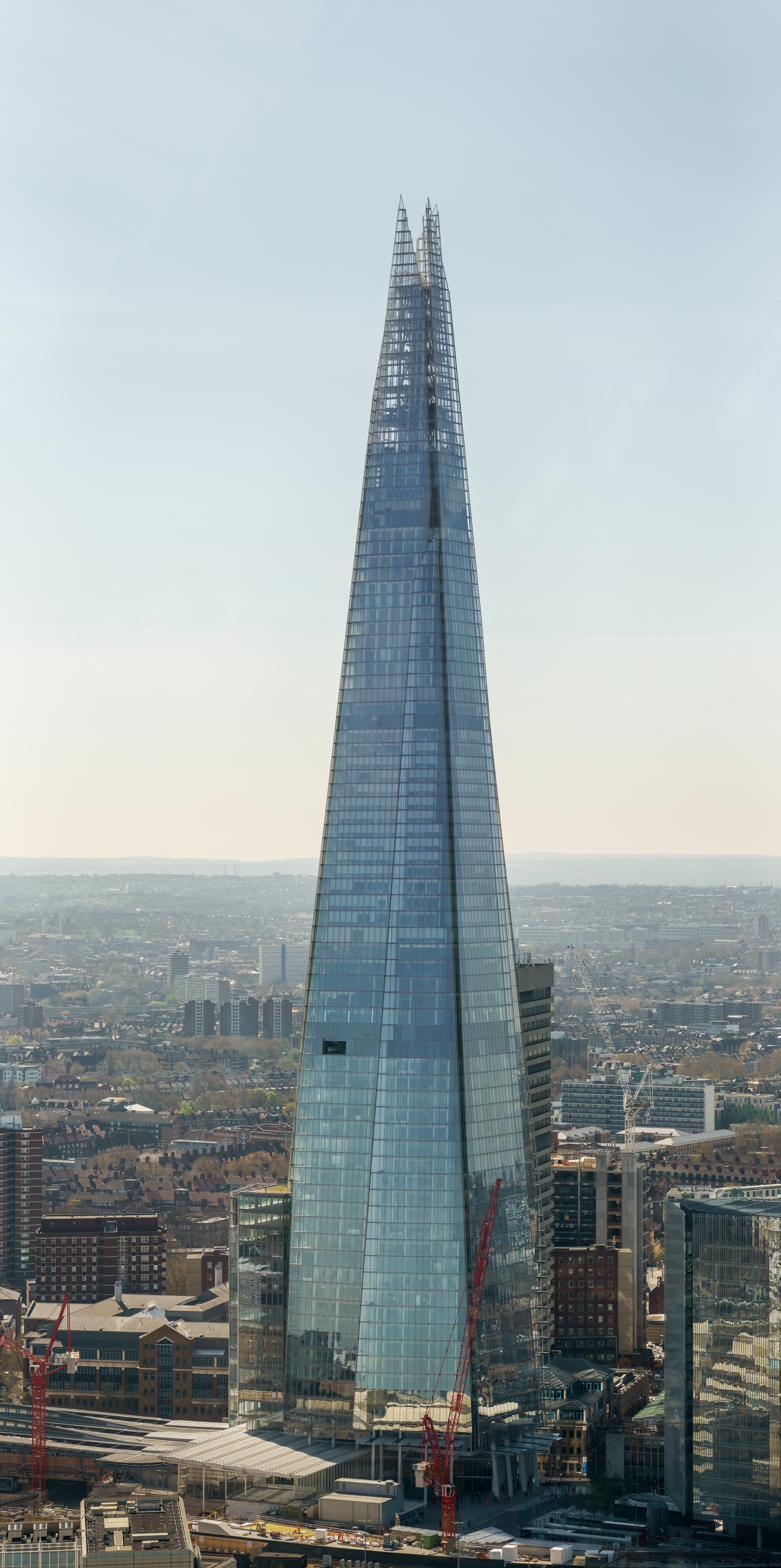
The Shard, London, UK (2012)

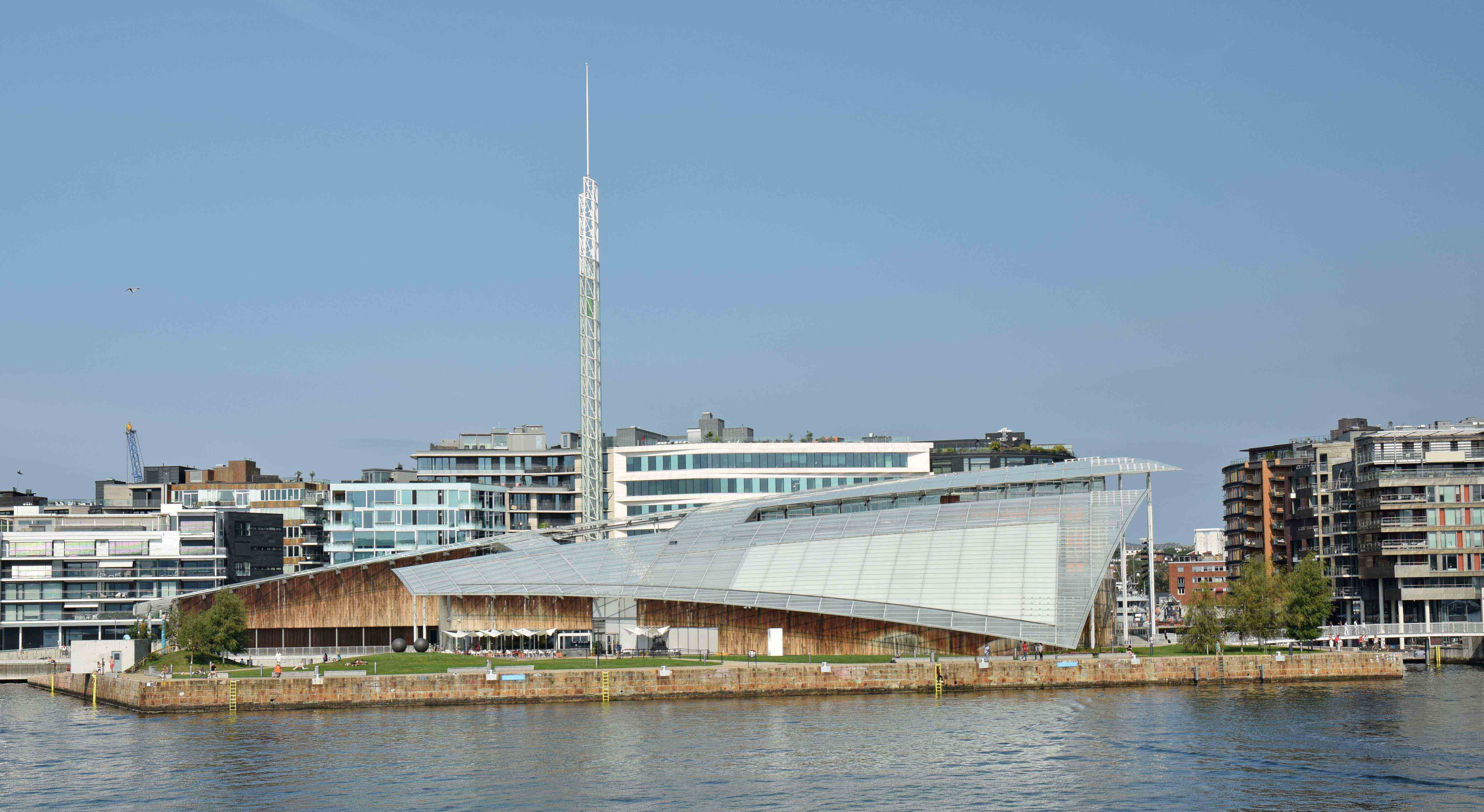
The Astrup Fearnley Museum of Modern Art, Oslo, Norway (2010–2013)

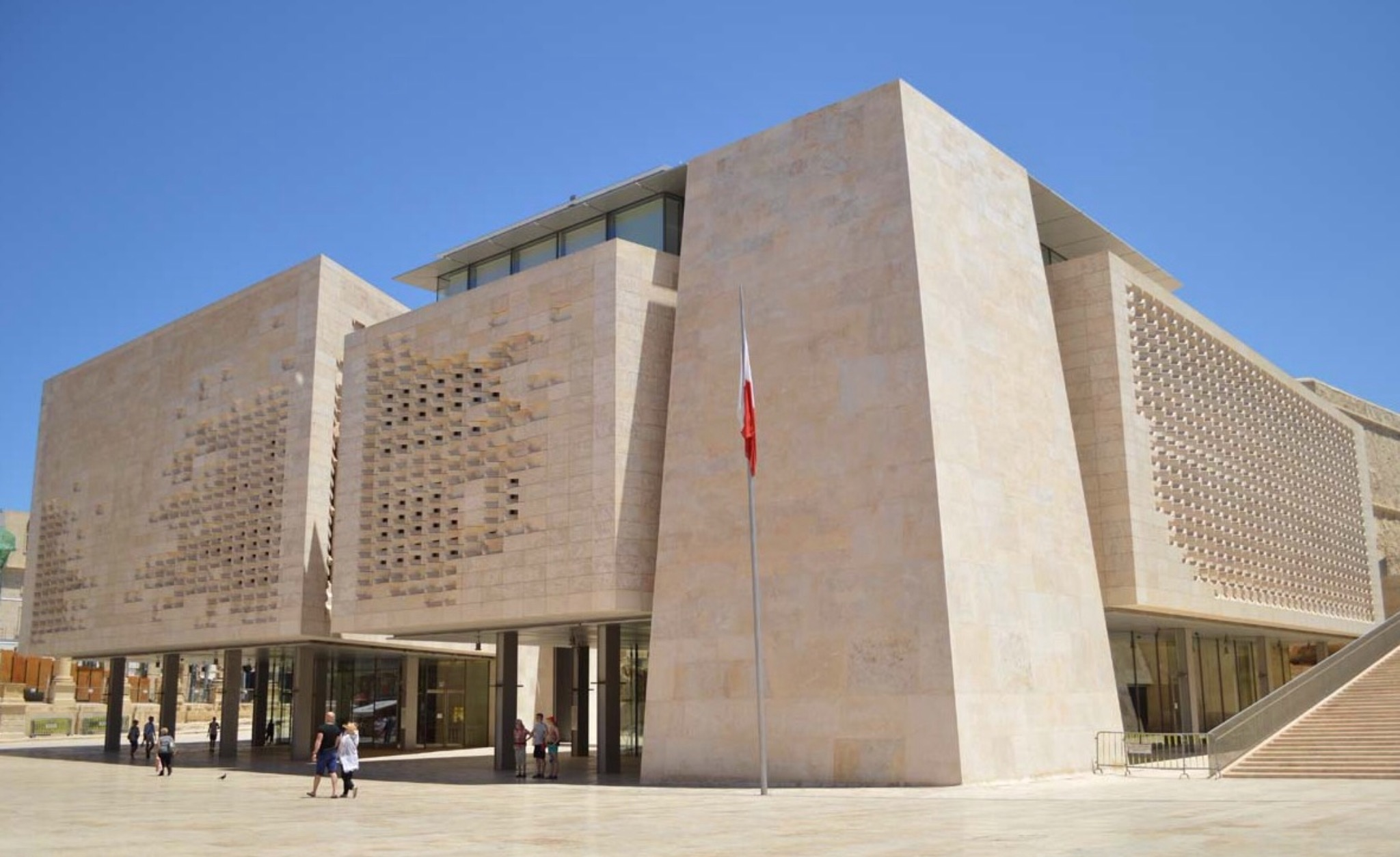
Parliament House in Valletta, Malta (2011–2015)

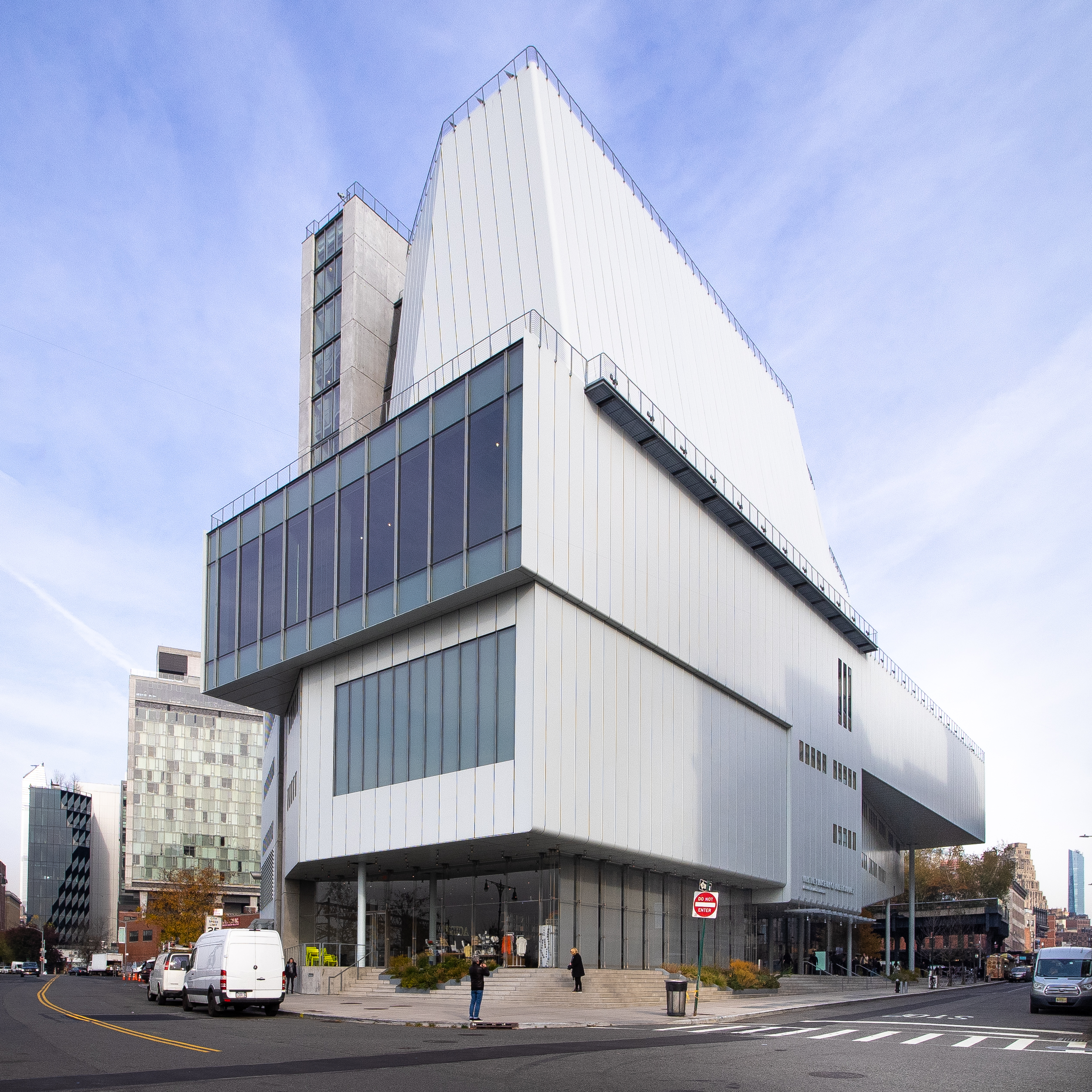
Whitney Museum of American Art, New York City (2007–2015)

Stavros Niarchos Foundation Cultural Center, Athens, Greece (2016)

=== The Shard, London (2000–2010) ===
The Shard, built over the underground station of London Bridge, is sixty-six stories and 305 metres (1,000 ft) high, which made it, when completed in 2012, the tallest skyscraper in Europe. Inside, it contains luxury residences and a hotel, along with offices, shops, restaurants, and cultural centers. It has a wide base and a split pinnacle point which seems to disappear into the clouds, like, as Piano described it, "a bell tower of the 16th century, or the mast of great ship...Often buildings of great height are aggressive and arrogant symbols of power and egoism," but the Shard is designed "to express its sharp and light presence in the urban panorama of London." Like his other tall buildings, the glass sunscreen on the exterior extends slightly above the building itself, appearing to split apart at the top. The critical reaction to the tower was predictably mixed. Simon Jenkins of the Guardian of London saw it as a foreign attack on the traditional London skyline and monuments: "This tower is anarchy. It conforms to no planning policy. It marks no architectural focus or rond-point. It offers no civic forum or function, just luxury flats and hotels. It stands apart from the City cluster and pays no heed to its surrounding context in scale, materials or ground presence. It seems to have lost its way from Dubai to Canary Wharf... The Shard has slashed the face of London for ever." However, Jonathan Glancy in the London Telegraph defended Piano's building: "The criticism – hurled against Piano like the spears of Ancient Britons fighting the civilised Romans – is, I think, a bottled up attack on our low standards of design and the beetle-browed politics that have allowed so many poor tall buildings to have been rushed up around St Paul's. The Shard, whatever its flaws – and all its many floors – is a much better building than most of the flakes below it."

=== Central Saint Giles, London (2002–2010) ===
The Central Saint Giles between St Giles High Street and New Oxford Street in London (2002–2010) is a complex composed of 56 luxury apartments, 53 social rented apartments, and 37,000 m^{2} (400,000 sq ft) of office around a public square with retail and food outlets, covering 7,000 m^{2} (75,000 sq ft). The site was previously occupied by a Ministry of Defence building and is partially on the site of a medieval leper colony, St Giles Hospital. A block 109 flats rises 11 floors and is set alongside offices rising to 11 floors to the east. A distinctive element is strident solid color which is designed not to mellow with time; the buildings are covered with large kiln-fired ceramic panels glazed leaf green, orange, lime green, pale grey and yellow. "Cities should not be dull and repetitive", Piano declared. "One of the reason we find them so beautiful and interesting is that they are full of surprises; even the idea of color represents a joyful surprise."

=== Los Angeles County Museum of Art (BCAM and Resnick Pavilion), Los Angeles (2003–2010) ===
Commissioned to design a "transformation" of the Los Angeles County Museum of Art, Piano designed a new building, the Broad Contemporary Art Museum at LACMA (BCAM) (2008), with 5,574 m^{2} (60,000 sq ft) of space, as well as the BP Grand Entrance, an entrance pavilion with 750 m^{2} (8,100 sq ft) of space, and the Lynda and Stewart Resnick Exhibition Pavilion (2010). The BCAM facade is concrete covered with plaques of cream-colored Italian travertine, harmonizing with the older buildings of the museum complex, but added distinctive Piano touches; finlike white sun shutters on the roof softening the sunlight, a red escalator on the outside of the main facade, and a stairway suspended by red cables on the other facade, reminiscent of the Centre Pompidou. The Resnik Pavilion, to the north of the BCAM, has 4,180 m^{2} (45,000 sq ft) of space, with travertine covered walls to the east and west, glass walls on the north and south, and a roof with vertical glass shutters that open to the sky. Describing this project, Piano wrote: "It's not enough that the light is perfect. You also have a need for calm, serenity, and even a quality of voluptuousness connected with the contemplation of a work of art." Nicolai Ouroussoff, the architecture critic of The New York Times, admired the interior of the BCAM but was less impressed by the exteriors: "There is little of the formal freedom that is at the heart of the city's architectural legacy; nor is there much evidence of the structural refinement that we have come to expect in Mr. Piano's best work. The museum's monumental travertine form and lipstick-red exterior stairways are a curious mix of pomposity and pop-culture references. It's an architecture without conviction."

=== Astrup Fearnley Museum of Modern Art, Oslo, Norway (2006–2012) ===
The Astrup Fearnley Museum of Modern Art in Oslo, Norway (2006–2012) was designed to revive an old port and industrial area southwest of the center of Oslo with an art museum and offices, and to provide a destination and attraction on the edge of the picturesque fjord. The project has three buildings, two museum buildings and an office building, under a single glass roof, which covers 6,000 m^{2} (65,000 sq ft). The construction materials include both steel and wood beams. A canal and walkway connect the museum with another area under development nearby, while the museum and walkway offer views of the fjord and center of Oslo. A sculpture park with works of Anish Kapoor, Louise Bourgeois and other notable sculptors is placed between the museum and the water. The museum building on one side of the canal holds permanent exhibits, while the building on the other side is used for temporary exhibits. A bridge over the canal the two museum buildings. The construction materials include steel, glass and wooden beams, while the facades that are not made of glass are covered with finely crafted weathered panels, in the tradition of Scandinavian architecture.

=== Kimbell Art Museum extension, Fort Worth, Texas (2007–2013) ===
The extension of the Kimbell Art Museum in Fort Worth, Texas (2007–2013) is an addition to the museum designed by Louis Kahn the modernist architect for whom Piano worked at the beginning of his career, completed in 1972. The building faces the Modern Art Museum of Fort Worth, designed by Tadao Ando (2002). The new gallery occupies 7,595 m^{2} (81,750 sq ft), compared with 11,148 m^{2} (120,000 sq ft) for the Kahn building, and cost 135 million dollars. Piano created a dramatic new entrance for the museum, with huge windows showing the bright red furniture against the alabaster white walls within. The materials used in the new museum included light-colored concrete, to harmonize with the Kahn building, combined with beams and ceilings of Douglas fir, and floors of white oak and an abundance of double-paned and fritted glass. The museum also includes modern ecological features including a vegetal roof, photovoltaic cells on the roof, geothermal wells, and LED lighting. Piano wrote: "Our building echoes the Kahn building through its height, its scale and its general plan, but our building has a character that is more transparent and more open. Light, discreet (half of the surfaces are underground), it nonetheless has its own character and creates a dialogue between the old and the new." However, the museum also attracted critics, who said it was not ambitious enough. Mark Lamster, architecture critic of the Dallas Morning News, wrote: "With its almost impossibly smooth walls and squared columns of titanium-treated concrete, Piano's front facade evinces a clinical, stoic perfectionism.... Altogether, the assembly is a minor miracle of construction. Most impressive are the beams: 100-foot-long bars of laminated Douglas fir, trucked from Canada. But for all its technical mastery, it offers none of the elemental majesty of Kahn's building across the lawn. It is deferential to a fault."

=== Whitney Museum of American Art, New York City (2007–2015) ===
The Whitney Museum of American Art decided to move from its original building on Madison Avenue, constructed by Marcel Breuer in 1966, to a new location at the corner of Gansevoort and Washington in Manhattan, a neighborhood once occupied by meat packing houses, next to the High Line, a riverside highway and park. The museum, with nine levels, has an asymmetric industrial look to match the architecture of the neighborhood. In addition to its interior galleries, it has 1,207 m^{2} (12,990 sq ft) of open-air exhibit space on a large terrace atop one section of the building. It was built of steel, concrete, and stone, but also with pine wood and other materials recycled from demolished factories. Jule Iovine, architecture critic of the Wall Street Journal, called it "a welcoming, creative machine" thanks to its "open, changeable spaces," and Michael Kimmelman, critic of the New York Times, called it "an outdoor perch to see and be seen... There's a generosity to the architecture, a sense of art connecting with the city and vice versa".

=== The Harvard Art Museums, Cambridge, Massachusetts (2008–2014) ===
Beginning in 2008, Piano rebuilt an existing structure to house the Harvard Art Museums, a consolidation of collections of the three art museums associated with Harvard University. The new museum preserved the picturesque brick Ivy-League facade of the 1925 Fogg Museum (1925), but added a new space in the courtyard, covered by a pyramidal glass roof, which increased the gallery space by 40 percent. The renovation adds six levels of galleries, classrooms, lecture halls, and new study areas providing access to parts of the 250,000-piece collection of the museums. The new building was opened in November 2014.

=== Valletta City Gate and Parliament House, Malta (2011–2015) ===
The 'City Gate' project in Valletta, Malta was the complete reorganization of the principal entrance to the Maltese capital of Valletta. It included a massive City Gate through the 16th-century city walls, an open-air theatre 'machine' within the ruins of the former Royal Opera House, and the construction of a new Parliament building. The gate project was controversial, though the old gate it replaced was only built in the 1960s, in the Italian rationalist style. The "theater machine" is particularly unusual; the original idea was that in summertime a steel portable theater with stage and wings and a thousand seats can be installed inside the ruins of the 19th century opera house, which had been destroyed in World War II. It has its own stage equipment and technology for reproducing the acoustics of a traditional opera house. When performances are not taking place, the "machine" was meant to turn back into a public square and gathering place. The Parliament House (2011–2015) is a mixture of modern technique and technology with the massive stone look of the city's old walls.

=== Centro de Arte Botín, Santander, Spain (2012–2017) ===
The Centro Botín in Santander, Spain is a private sponsored project by the Fundación Botín whose aim is to be a hub for the promotion of culture both as a museum and as study centre. It consists on two buildings standing on columns over the sea line at the Bay of Santander. The western building hosts the exhibition space of 5,000 m^{2} (54,000 sq ft) and the eastern is the one dedicated to study which hosts an auditorium, study rooms and other installations. Both are connected by a suspended square and set of stairs and platforms named "pachinko". This was Piano's first project in Spain and had some controversy over its location. Critics describe the building as sublime and striking due to the conjunction of light, views and design that the buildings propose.

=== Stavros Niarchos Foundation Cultural Center, Athens, Greece (2016) ===
The Stavros Niarchos Foundation Cultural Center (SNFCC) in Athens, Greece is one of Piano's most dramatic projects. Located next to Falirio Bay at Kalithea, an ancient Greek port, four kilometres (2.5 mi) south of central Athens, on a site which served as a parking lot for the 2004 Summer Olympics, it combines the Greek National Library and a new opera house for the Greek National Opera along with the Stavros Niarchos Park, an urban park covering an area of 210,000 m^{2} (2,300,000 sq ft). An artificial hill was created to raise the building and give it a view of the nearby sea. The opera house has a 1400-seat main theater and a smaller "black box" theater of 400 seats. On top of the opera house a square horizontal glass box is placed, called Pharos (Lighthouse), similar to the perch of the art museum atop the Lingotto factory in Turin. The entire structure is covered by a single flat roof, which provides shade, and which is covered with 10,000 m^{2} (110,000 sq ft) of photovoltaic cells, generating 1.5 megawatts of electricity, designed to the building self-sufficient in energy during working hours. The cost of the project was 588 million dollars.

=== Projects in North America, Europe, Asia, and Australia (2016-2025) ===
The Krause Gateway Center in downtown Des Moines, Iowa adjacent to Western Gateway Park is the headquarters for the Krause Group, parent company of Kum & Go. The architecture features long overhangs and giant glass panels.

The Jerome L. Greene Science Center for Mind Brain Behavior is part of the Manhattanville Campus of Columbia University in Upper Manhattan, New York City (with SOM). Besides the Greene science center, the RPBW designed the Lenfest Center for the Arts, the Forum, and the School of International and Public Affairs. 565 Broome at 565 Broome St., a twin-tower 30-story residential building in the west Soho neighborhood of Manhattan, broke ground December 2015 and was completed in 2019. The building is Piano's first ever residential structure in New York.

The Float Office Building, Düsseldorf, Germany was completed in 2018.

The Academy Museum of Motion Pictures in Los Angeles opened in 2021, after conversion from the Art Deco landmark May Company Department Store (1939).

The GES-2 cultural center, home of the V-A-C Foundation, opened in Moscow in 2021 in a former power plant (1907). It was financed by Leonid Mikhelson, of the power company Novatek.

CERN partnered with the Renzo Piano Building Workshop for its new education and outreach center in Meyrin, Switzerland, named CERN Science Gateway. It was opened in October 2023 housing three permanent exhibitions, two hands-on education labs and an auditorium for up to 800 people.

The Ontario Court of Justice in Toronto was completed in 2023. The skyscrapers One Sydney Harbour, Sydney, Australia, and Fubon Xinyi A25 in Taipei, Taiwan opened in 2024.

== Projects under construction or in development ==
- Sesto San Giovanni masterplan, Milan, Italy (2004–)
- Stavros Niarchos Foundation Agora Institute on the campus of The Johns Hopkins University
- Ars Aevi museum of contemporary art in Sarajevo, Bosnia and Herzegovina.
- Commercial center redesign for Tour Montparnasse, Paris.

== Honors and awards ==
In 1998, Piano won the Pritzker Prize, often considered the Nobel Prize of architecture. The jury citation compared Piano to Michelangelo and da Vinci and credited him with "redefining modern and postmodern architecture."

In 2006, Piano was selected by TIME as one of the 100 most influential people in the world. He was chosen as the tenth most influential person in the "Arts and Entertainment" category.

On 18 March 2008, he became an honorary citizen of Sarajevo, Bosnia and Herzegovina.

In August 2013, he was appointed Senator for Life in the Senate by Italian president Giorgio Napolitano.

=== Awards ===
- 1989, Royal Gold Medal
- 1990, Knight Grand Cross of the Order of Merit of the Italian Republic
- 1990, Kyoto Prize
- 1994, Gold Medal of Merit for Culture and Art
- 1995, Erasmus Prize
- 1995, Praemium Imperiale
- 1998, Pritzker Architecture Prize
- 2000, Spirit of Wood Architecture Award, Helsinki, Finland
- 2002, International Union of Architects#UIA Gold Medal
- 2004, Honorary doctorate from Columbia University, New York
- 2006, Gold Medal for Italian Architecture, Milano
- 2008, AIA Gold Medal
- 2008, Sonning Prize
- 2013, elected into the National Academy of Design, New York City
- 2017, Knight Grand Cross of the Civil Order of Alfonso X, the Wise

== Professional and personal life ==
Piano founded the Renzo Piano Building Workshop (RPBW) in 1981. In 2017 it had 150 collaborators in offices in Paris, Genoa, and New York.

In 2004, he became head of the Renzo Piano Foundation, dedicated to the promotion of the architectural profession. Since June 2008, the headquarters has been co-located with his architectural office at Punta Nave, near Genoa.

After his nomination as Senator for Life in 2013, an honour limited to five office holders in the sole gift of the Italian President, Renzo Piano set up a team of young architects called G124 whose mission is to work on the transformation of Italy's major cities' suburbs. Team members are paid with Renzo Piano senator's salary and change every year through a public selection. Projects have been developed in Turin, Milan, Padua, Venice and Rome.

Piano resides in Paris with his second wife Milly and four children, Carlo, Matteo, Lia – from his first wife – and Giorgio.

Since April 2023 he has been a member of the board of directors of the Agnelli Foundation.

In 2026, Piano said he avoided giving Parisian taxi drivers his name for years after the Centre Pompidou opened, since its design was not uniformly popular. He added that he hoped his Tour Montparnasse redesign would not have that effect, and he didn't think it would.

== Bibliography ==
- Jodidio, Philip (2016). Renzo Piano Building Workshop (in French). Taschen. ISBN 978-3-8365-3637-0.
- Piano, Renzo (2009) [2007]. La Désobéissance de l'Architecte (in French). Translated by Olivier Favier. Arléa. ISBN 978-2-86959-849-2.
- Taschen, Aurelia and Balthazar (2016). L'Architecture Moderne de A à Z (in French). Bibliotheca Universalis. ISBN 978-3-8365-5630-9.
