= 565 Broome Street =

Residential building in Manhattan, New York

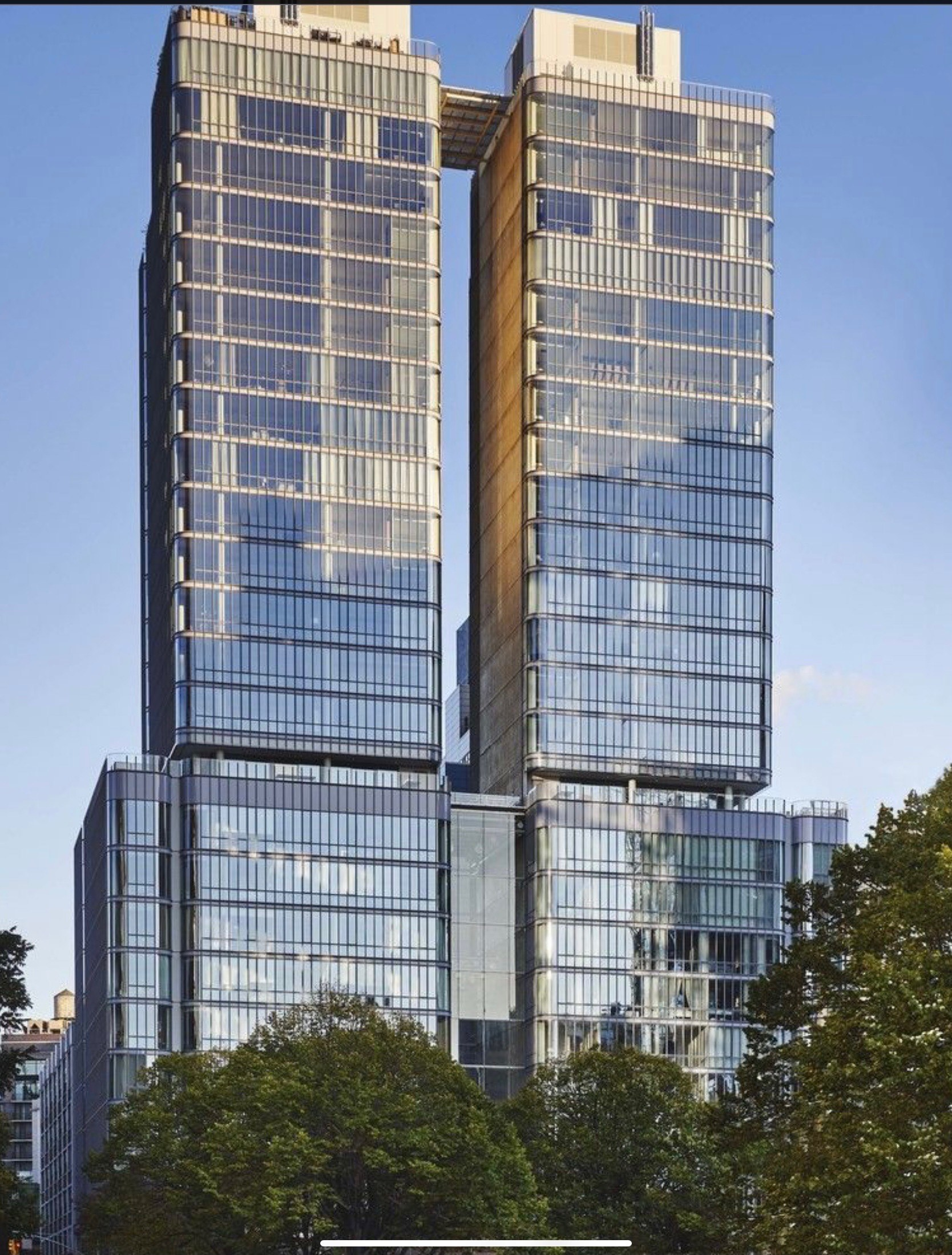
- Facade of 565 Broome Street
- Interactive map of the 565 Broome Street area

General information
- Status: Completed
- Type: Residential Condominiums
- Location: 565 Broome Street, Manhattan, New York, U.S.
- Coordinates: 40°43′27″N 74°0′20″W
- Completed: 2018

Technical details
- Floor count: 30

Design and construction
- Architect: Renzo Piano
- Developer: Bizzi & Partners Development

Website
- 565broomesoho.com

565 Broome Street is a luxury residential building in the Manhattan neighborhood of SoHo in New York City. The complex, a 30-story dual tower development, was designed by Pritzker Prize-winning architect Renzo Piano and was his first residential building in New York City.

Both towers rise to 290 feet (88 m) in height and contain 115 apartments ranging from studios to four-bedroom units. Piano selected the SoHo location for its relatively low-rise surroundings, to allow for expansive views of Manhattan, Tribeca, and the Hudson River. Notably, the development is the first high-end residential ‘zero waste’ building in New York City. This is defined by the building achieving more than 90% diversion of waste from landfills, incinerators, and the environment.

== History ==
The development now known as 565 Broome SoHo began taking shape in early 2014. It was developed in collaboration between Bizzi & Partners Development, Aronov Development and Halpern Real Estate Ventures. The eight-parcel site was initially acquired for $130 million. In mid-2015, Renzo Piano was revealed as the lead architect, and by spring 2016 the first detailed design renderings had been released. In 2017, sales of the first condo units were underway.

== Architecture ==
=== Exterior ===
Situated at the center of the conjoined towers is a glass lounge conservatory that rises 90 feet (27 m), complete with a wet bar and a library curated by the luxury art book publisher Taschen. The exterior design utilizes curved corner windows with low-iron glass to maximize clarity and natural light. Piano's desire was to ‘make you feel like you are flying’. The building also features a porte-cochère that leads into an automated garage, where cars are mechanically stored on upper levels, providing residents with a private and streamlined arrival experience.

=== Interior ===
The interior, designed by the Parisian firm RDAI, offers a wide range of upscale amenities, including a 55-foot (17 m) heated pool, a full fitness center and spa, and a private driveway with an automated parking system. Six of the units also boast their own private outdoor saltwater pools.
