= Carignano (Genoa) =

District of Genoa, Italy

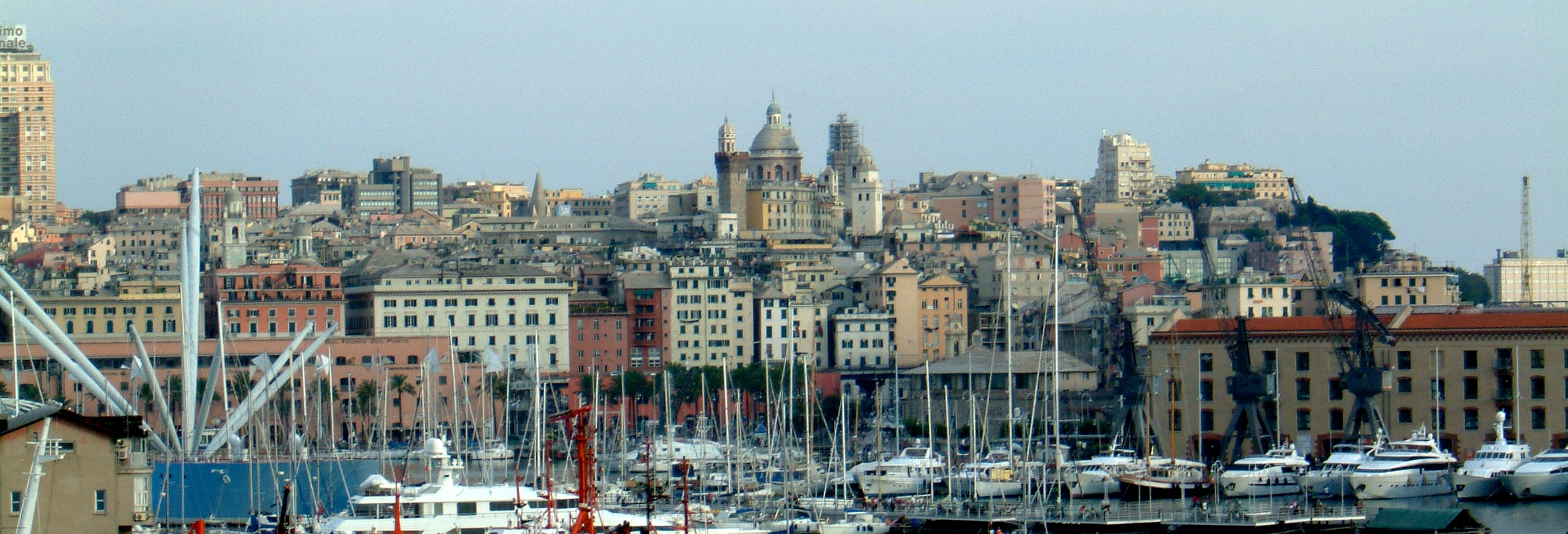
- The hill of Carignano seen from the Old Port
- Country: Italy
- Region: Liguria
- Province: Genoa
- City: Genoa
- Circoscrizione: Municipio I Centro Est
- Neighborhood: Portoria
- Other neighborhoods: San Vincenzo
- Postal code: 16121 - 16128
- Area: 0,591 km²
- Population: 7,252
- Density: 12 270.73 Inh./km²

Carignano (Caignan, Carignan or Cavignan in Ligurian) is a residential district in the center of Genoa, administratively included in Municipio I Centro Est.

Located on a hill at an average elevation of 50 m above sea level, it was formerly part of the sestiere of Portoria, one of the six administrative subdivisions that formed the city of Genoa.

The hill of Carignano, the last eastern offshoot of the hilly circle enclosing Genoa's historic center, overlooks the mouth of the Bisagno River to the east, while to the south, before the filling in of the sea for the expansion of the port and the construction of the fairgrounds, it overlooked the sea with its rocky coastline. On the hill, once sparsely populated and secluded, stood convents and patrician villas. Its urbanization, which dates back to the second half of the 19th century, transformed the area into one of Genoa's most elegant and upscale residential neighborhoods, along with Albaro and Castelletto. The top of the hill is dominated by the imposing basilica of S. Maria Assunta, among Genoa's most valuable buildings of worship, clearly visible from many parts of the city.

== Description of the district ==
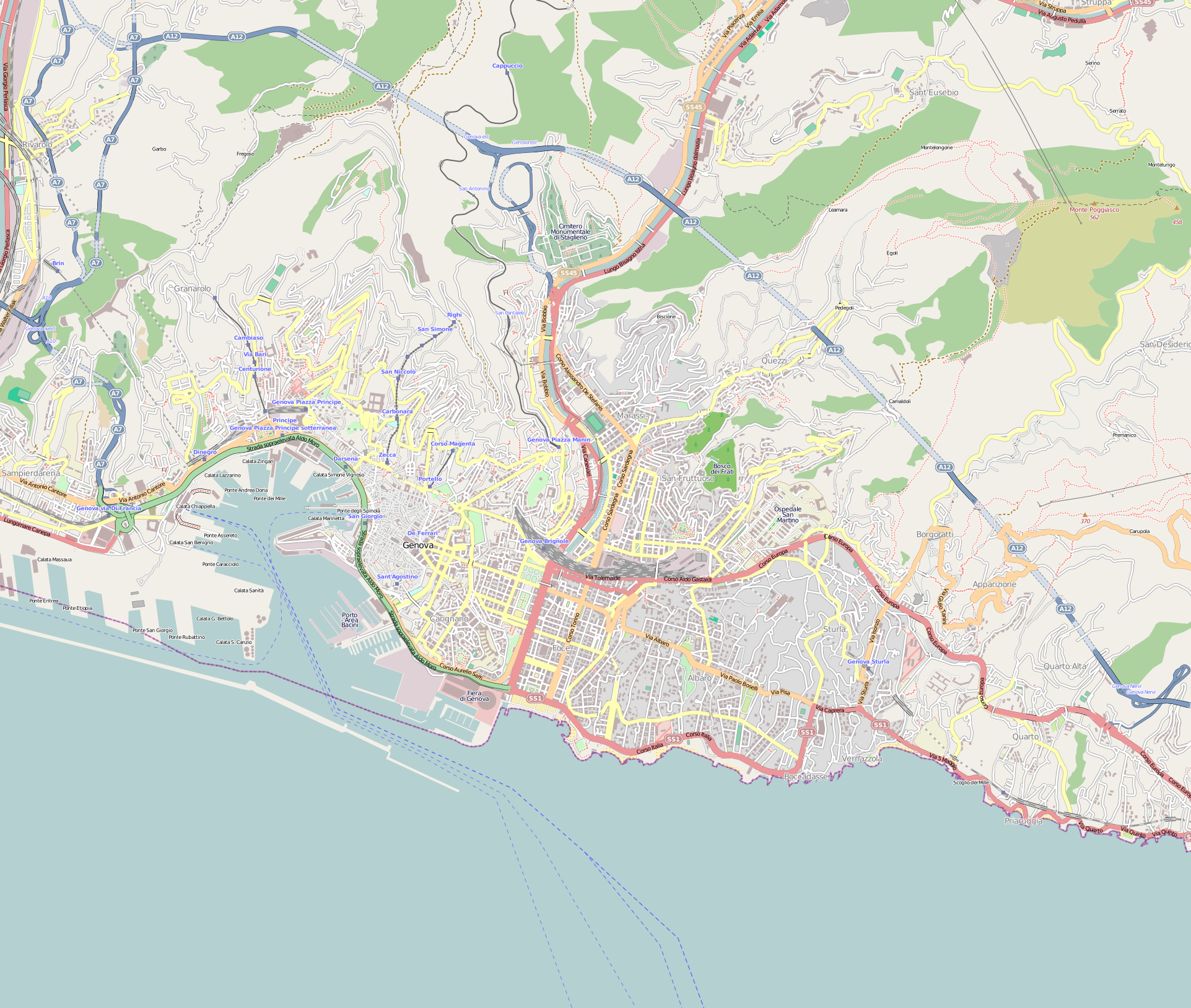
Carignano (Historic center of Genoa)

=== Toponym ===
The origin of the toponym is uncertain: Giustiniani (16th century) suggests it derives from a certain Carinius, a landowner in the 4th century; according to others it would derive from "Caryn Ianum" meaning "villa of Janus." In the 10th century it is mentioned as Caliniano, but over time the toponyms Cariniano, Cavignano and Calignano are also attested.

=== Territory ===
The district of Carignano, once part of the Portoria district, is one of the "urban units" into which the Municipio I Centro Est of the city of Genoa is divided and occupies an area between the Barbarossa walls and the sixteenth-century city wall, bordered to the west by the Molo, to the east by the Foce, to the north by Portoria, and to the south by the port area.

The "urban unit" of Carignano includes two distinct areas, both morphologically as well as historically and urbanistically:

- The district of Carignano proper, with a predominantly residential function, occupies the hill of the same name, the terminal part of a hilly ridge that separates the last stretch of the Bisagno Valley from the small valley of the Rivo Torbido, a short stream, entirely covered since the 16th century, that originates from the hill of Multedo (in the area of Piazza Manin, in the Castelletto district) and flows into the sea within the port area, flowing below the streets of Portoria. The stream had taken this name because its waters were used by dyers for their activities.
- The area of the ancient "Borgo dei Lanaioli," a historic working-class district once lying between Ponticello Square and the Mura della Marina. The suburb, which arose in the 12th century and completely disappeared with the urban upheavals of the second half of the 20th century and was replaced by business centers, occupied both sides of the small valley of Rivo Torbido, between the hills of Carignano and Sarzano. The road through it took various names (Via dei Lanaioli, Via dei Servi, Via Madre di Dio and Via della Marina). Via Madre di Dio, just below the Carignano bridge, was the best known street, with which the entire district was often identified. The suburb also included the old houses of the “Marina,” some of which survived demolition, overlooking the inlet known as the “seno di Giano” (filled in at the end of the 19th century for the expansion of the port), into which the creek flowed.

The boundaries of the Carignano area are: Via della Marina and Via del Colle toward the Pier, Piazza Dante and Via Porta degli Archi toward Portoria, Corso Podestà, the Mura delle Cappuccine and Via Vannucci (toward the Foce), and the sea ring road (Corso Saffi and Corso Quadrio) toward the fairgrounds and the port.

== Demographics ==
As of December 31, 2017, the total population of the former Portoria district had a population of 12,514, of which 7,252 were in the “urban unit” of Carignano alone. Available historical data cover the Portoria constituency as a whole, with the two urban units of “S. Vincenzo” and “Carignano.” The demographic history of the former district is affected by the urbanistic vicissitudes of the area. The population, 35,877 at the first census in 1861, rose to 40,260 in 1901, a figure representing the “historical maximum.” Since then, as most of these old districts have been turned over to business centers and tertiary activities, a conspicuous decline in population began. The number of inhabitants, still 35,007 in 1936, declined to 20,021 in 1961 to 12,514 in 2017, of which 7,252, as already mentioned, in the Carignano urban unit alone.

== History ==
=== Origins ===
In the Middle Ages, the area of the present district was a very large hill, outside the first city walls (it would be incorporated only with the 14th-century expansions); although it was a short distance from the city center, it was a secluded area accessed only through steep alleys (Salita dei Sassi, Salita S. Leonardo, Salita della Montagnola dei Servi), with vegetable gardens, peasant houses, patrician villas, churches and monasteries.

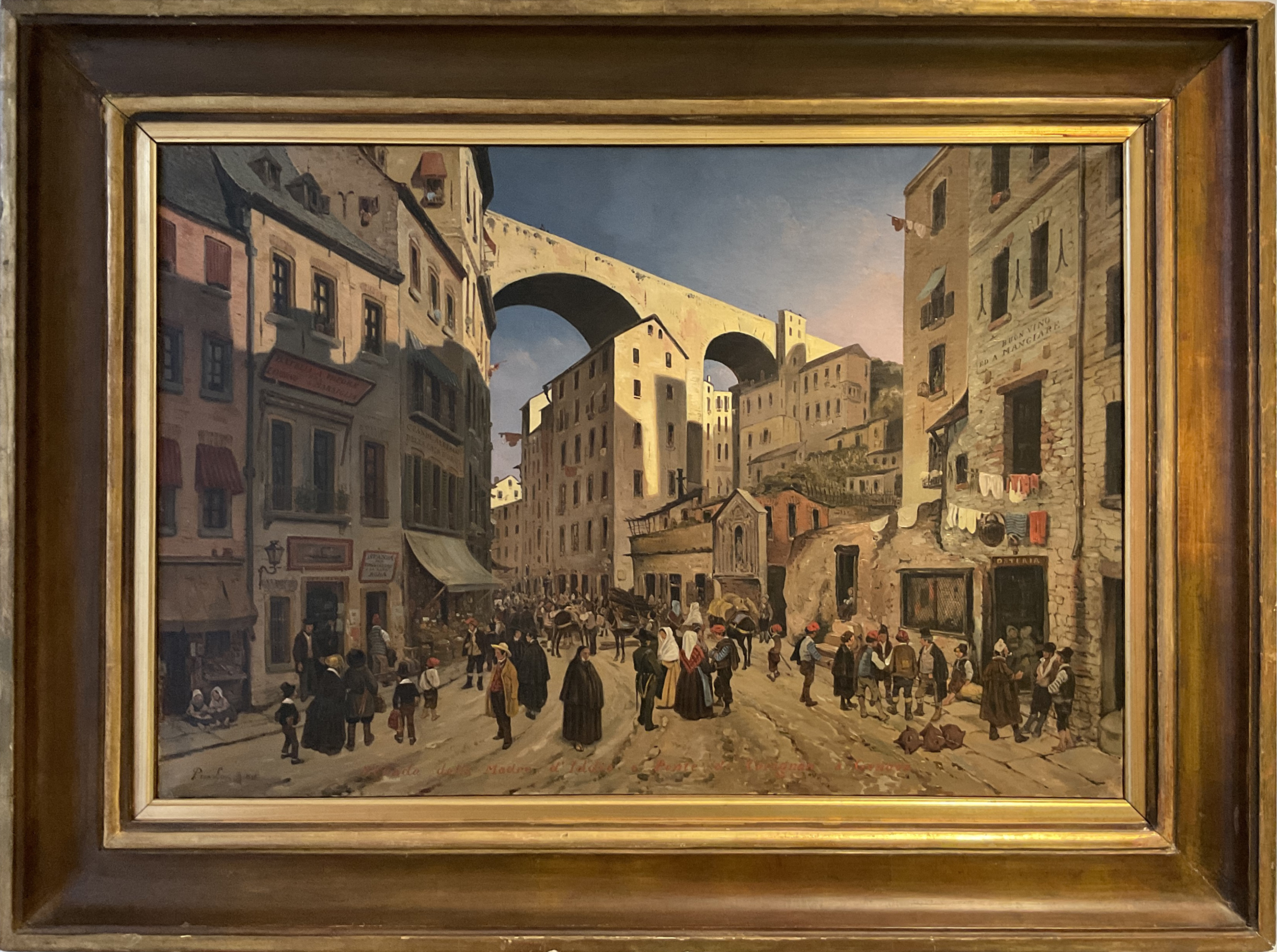
A bustling Via Madre di Dio and the Carignano bridge in a painting by Pieter Van Loon (1801 - 1873)

At the top of the hill was since the 14th century a settlement of the Fieschi family, who had built the church of S. Maria in via Lata there. The presence of the Fieschi ceased around the middle of the 16th century due to the political decline of this powerful family. Still around the middle of the 17th century it was a resort of Genoese patrician families, with many sumptuous villas surrounded by vegetable gardens and orchards.

In contrast to the secluded and stately hilltop, the village of Lanaioli, on the banks of the Rio Torbido, where weavers from the Fontanabuona valley lived from the 12th century onward, was, along with Ponticello and Piccapietra, one of the historic working-class agglomerations of the Portoria district; like these it was demolished in the 1970s to build the new business centers. Via Madre di Dio, which became a symbol of the urban upheavals of the twentieth century, was one of the liveliest streets in Genoa's historic center.

Giustiniani, a bishop and historian, described the area in his “Annals” in the early sixteenth century as follows:

Carignano is an area on a hill that extends to the sea, forming a promontory. And it was all this region, villa of a Roman citizen named Carino, from whom it got its name: and there are fifty gardens or villas of the citizens, very charming, adorned with magnificent buildings and splendid houses; the palace of the Count of Fiesco with the church of the Assumption of Our Lady, under the title of S. Maria Inviolata, which is de jure patronatus the property of the nobles of Fiesco; and it has good incomes. There is also the convent of S. Bernardo, vulgarly called "le monachette", and the convent of S. Leonardo, where live the regulars of S. Chiara, with another small church built by the Sauli in honor of S. Sebastiano; and near the church of Servi, below, seven houses of plebeians belonging to this parish. And at the head of the promontory to the sea are quarried rocks and stones for the construction of the wharf.

— Agostino Giustiniani, "Annals of the Republic of Genoa", 1537

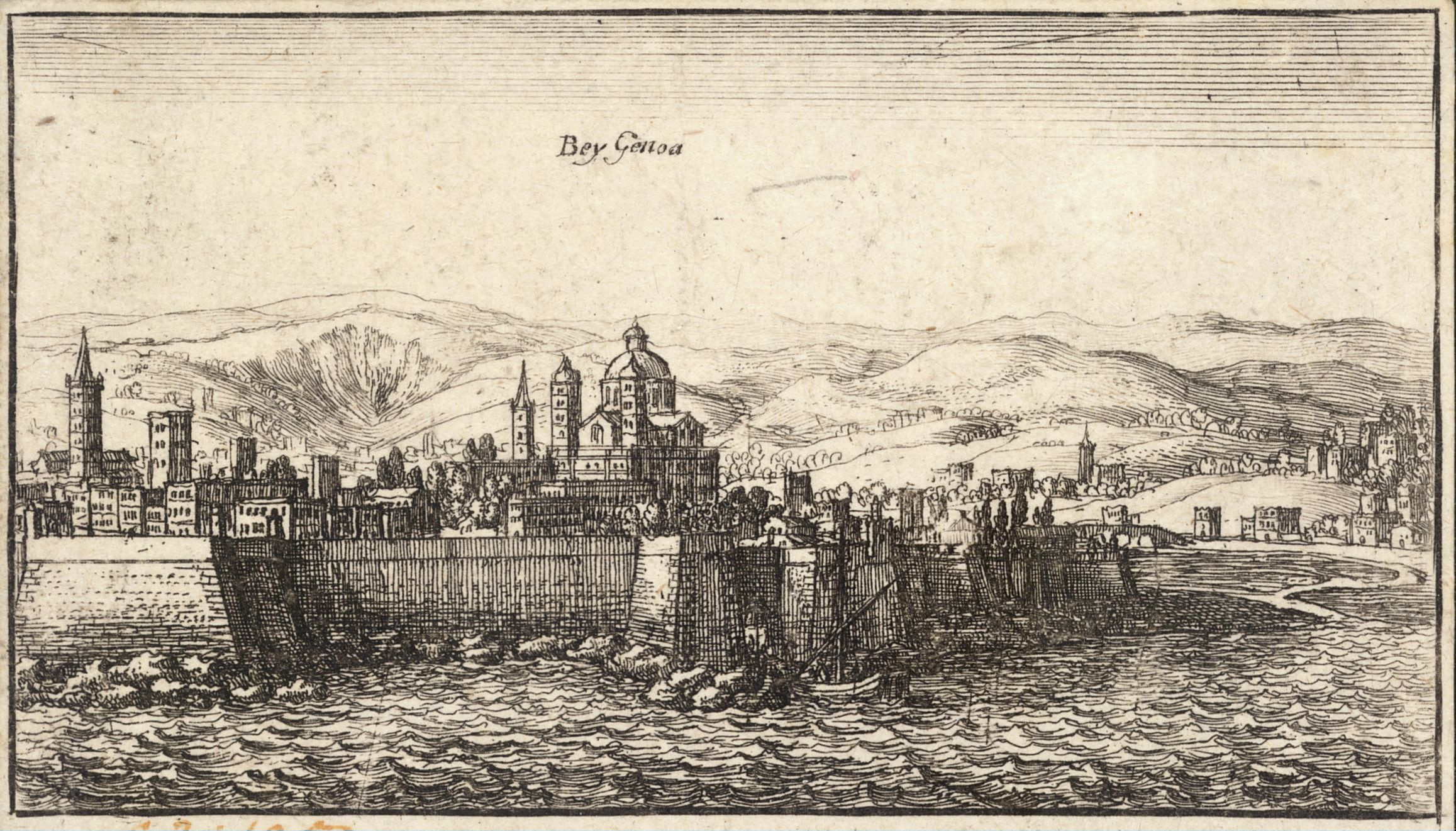
The hill of Carignano seen from the sea, in a seventeenth-century view; in the center, in an environment that is still not urbanized, stands the Basilica of the Assumption

In 1547, after Gianluigi Fieschi's failed conspiracy against Andrea Doria, with the consequent political decline of the family, the Fieschis lost their properties in Carignano: the Senate of the Republic in that same year decreed the total demolition of the sumptuous Fieschi palace, which had been built around 1390 next to the aristocratic church of S. Maria in Via Lata.

A few years later, around the middle of the sixteenth century, another patrician family, the Sauli, already present on the hill with their own settlement, as a symbol of their prestige wanted to build at the top of the hill the great basilica of S. Maria Assunta, which still characterizes the landscape profile of the district.

=== The eighteenth century ===
The balloon

After the very first ascent of a balloon in Paris on June 15, 1783 the same event was successfully repeated in Carignano on January 14, 1784 in front of the palace of Marquis Vincenzo Spinola. The balloon, as the chronicles of the time narrate, which was made of goldbeater's skin, rose to the height of three hundred toises (about five hundred meters) and disappeared beyond the hills of Albaro.

In the eighteenth century the Sauli family had the Carignano bridge built, which bypassed the densely inhabited valley of the Rivo Torbido (Via Madre di Dio, Via dei Servi) and reached Sarzano. The construction of the bridge, at least initially, did not contribute to breaking the isolation of the area, as it was a private representative route.

A proposal made by the Fathers of the Commune to build a public road that would allow the passage of carriages dates back to 1772, and two years later the proposal was implemented.

In a poem by dialect poet Steva De Franchi entitled "L'estate," one can read the proposal made to Minetta, the revendeiroeura de Fossello Minetta Minini, of walking to enjoy the coolness in Carignano:

Se sciù ro ponte andemmo/lì regna l'allegria./Gh'è bona compagnia/tutti govendo stan.

==== Genoese Freemasons ====
Police reports dated 1749 reveal that the first Genoese Masonic meetings were held in some houses in Carignano, news that is also reported in the text of a lecture held in the “Trionfo Ligure” Lodge, entitled “The Trionfo Ligure Lodge and Genoese Freemasonry in the History of the City,” which was held on November 18, 1970. The text was later published as a pamphlet and freely distributed, and it said precisely that the first reports of Freemasons in Genoa dated back to 1749 and that Freemasons met in two houses in Carignano under the name "Company of Happiness."

=== The nineteenth century ===
The centuries-old isolation of the district came to an end in the second half of the nineteenth century. Barabino's urban plan, as early as 1825, called for the creation of an elliptical square with the basilica of St. Mary of the Assumption in the center, with a series of streets arranged in a radial pattern around it. In practice, the urbanistic constructions, which began only from the middle of the century, were inspired by this plan, but in a fragmentary and episodic way. Instead of villas, dwellings were built for upper middle-class elites, but some settlements of council houses also found their place; in 1878 the large hospital complex of S. Andrea was built at the behest of the Duchess of Galliera. New roads were built to connect the new residential settlements with the city center. Via Rivoli and Via Corsica were opened in the direction of the Sea Ring Road, Via Fieschi towards Piazza Ponticello; towards the end of the century with the construction of the Monumental Bridge (1895) the district was connected with the Acquasola esplanade and Piazza Corvetto, completing its integration into the city road system.

=== The twentieth century ===
Paganini's house and the “plastic gardens”

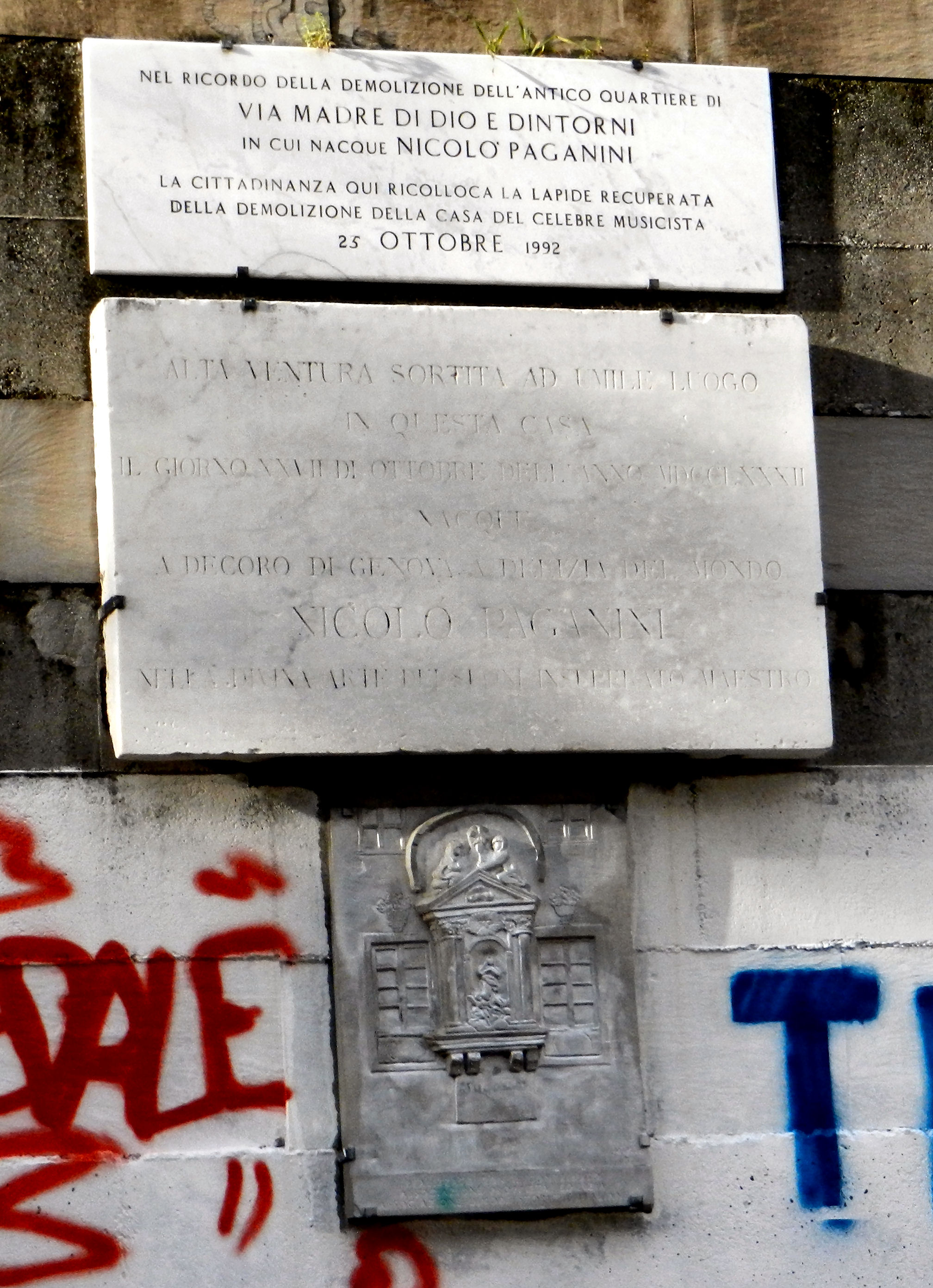

The implementation of the urban redevelopment plan for Via Madre di Dio caused the disappearance of the birth house of the famous composer and violinist Niccolò Paganini, which was located at No. 38 Passo Gattamora, in the tangle of caruggi between Via dei Servi and Via del Colle. The house was demolished in 1971 despite the fact that the local press and public opinion had clearly spoken out for its preservation. The lively controversy aroused by the demolition was not entirely quelled over time, as attested by a plaque affixed near the place where it stood, along with the original one recovered from the rubble, the text of which was written by Anton Giulio Barrili, and a small bas-relief depicting the aedicule with the “Madonna and Child” present on the facade of the house, preserved in the St. Augustine Museum. Public gardens, officially named “Baltimore Gardens,” in homage to the U.S. city twinned with Genoa, but commonly referred to as “plastic gardens,” were created on part of this area, left free of buildings.

The main events that characterized the district in the twentieth century are mainly related to the urban redevelopment of Via Madre di Dio and surrounding areas. A first significant intervention in the “Marina” area had been carried out towards the end of the nineteenth century, with the burying of the “Seno di Giano” to create Corso Principe Oddone (since 1946 renamed Corso Maurizio Quadrio). The characteristic “scoglio Campana” thus disappeared. On the area removed from the sea in the first decade of the new century the “Albergo Popolare” (1906) and the “Casa della Gente di Mare” (1909) were built, intended to accommodate migrants and seafarers in transit in the port of Genoa at popular prices. Both buildings were to be demolished in the 1990s to make way for a parking lot. The "Popular Hotel," which had been converted into a fire station after the war, was demolished with explosive charges on May 12, 1992.

==== The urban redevelopment of Via Madre di Dio ====
Salita Fieschi, ancient print with the rosy elevation of the temple at the top.

— Camillo Sbarbaro, "Fuochi fatui", 1956

The old working-class blocks of flats in Via Madre di Dio, Via dei Servi and Via del Colle (Cheullia), in a state of decay for some time, partly damaged or destroyed by the bombing of World War II, with the systematic application of the urban plan carried out between 1969 and 1973 disappeared completely to make way for modern business centers, housing the offices of the Region of Liguria, municipal bodies and private companies. In the postwar period, the need had become pressing to create modern workspaces, accessible by roads suitable for the growing automobile traffic and equipped with parking and services. The area chosen for the new settlements was that of the old Borgo Lanaioli, now in a state of decay and largely damaged by bombing.

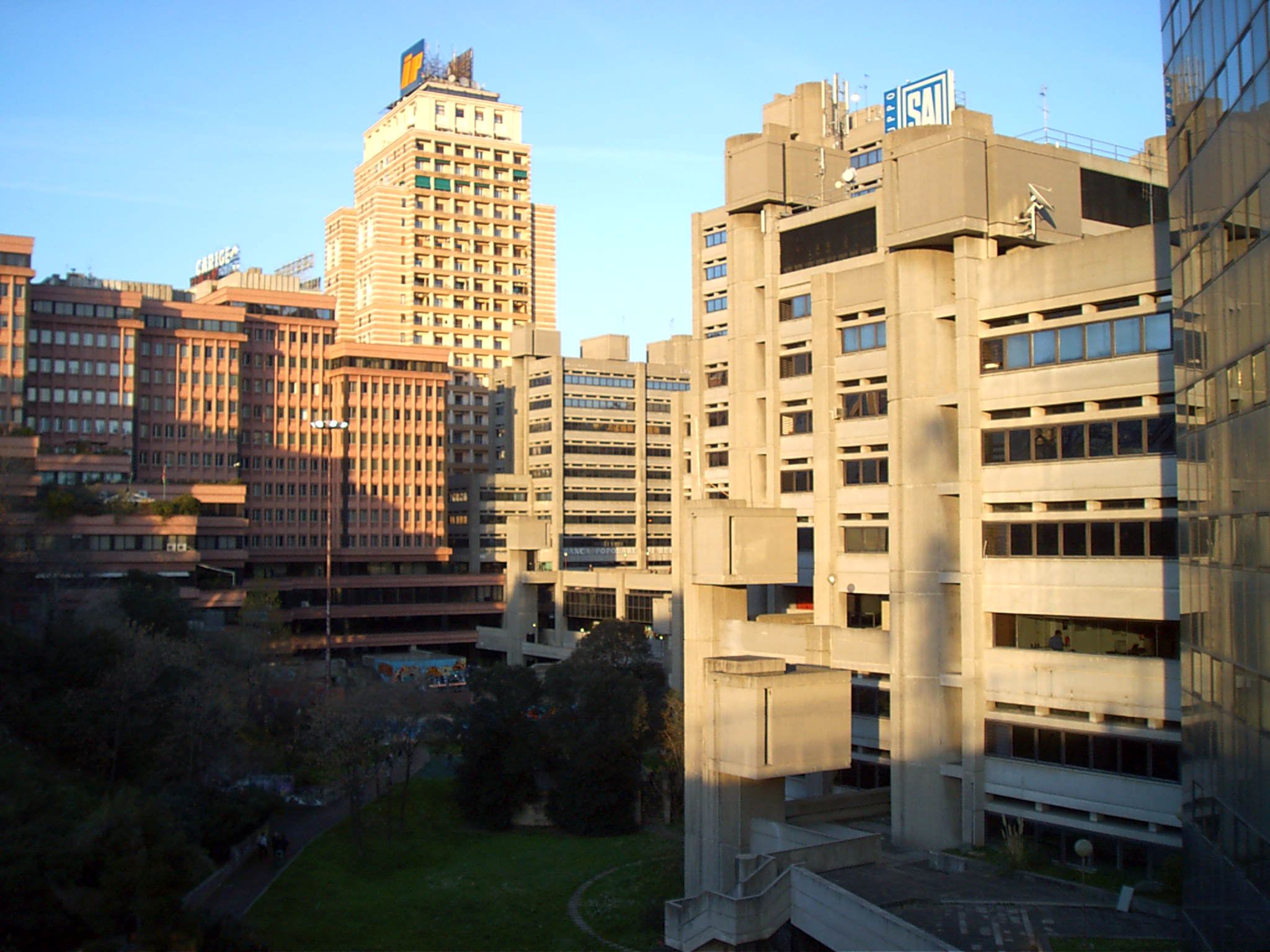
The "Center of the Ligurians"

The 1966 "Detailed Plan" completed the urban renewal begun in the 1930s with the creation of Piazza Dante, creating, close to the Piacentini Tower, a large building designed by Marco Dasso, called the "Center of the Ligurians," stretched toward the sea along the Rivo Torbido valley, opposed to which another office building, characterized by pink artificial stone cladding, designed by Franco Albini and Franca Helg, was built.

Architect Dasso's intervention, at the center of a bitter controversy between “restorers” and “innovators,” deliberately rejected restyling operations, choosing the path of total renovation of building structures. On the other hand, it should be considered that the redevelopment of blighted areas resulted in the expulsion of the poor classes that inhabited them, an aspect often neglected in the debate among architects but generally felt by the public, a reason why the radical urban redevelopment was seen by many Genoese above all as the disintegration of an established social fabric, of a popular world that disappeared along with the old houses, replaced by cold modern architecture. Many years later, it is not uncommon that the terms havoc and speculation are still used to define these urbanistic operations.

== Monuments and places of interest ==
=== Squares, streets and public spaces ===
==== Panoramic viewpoints ====
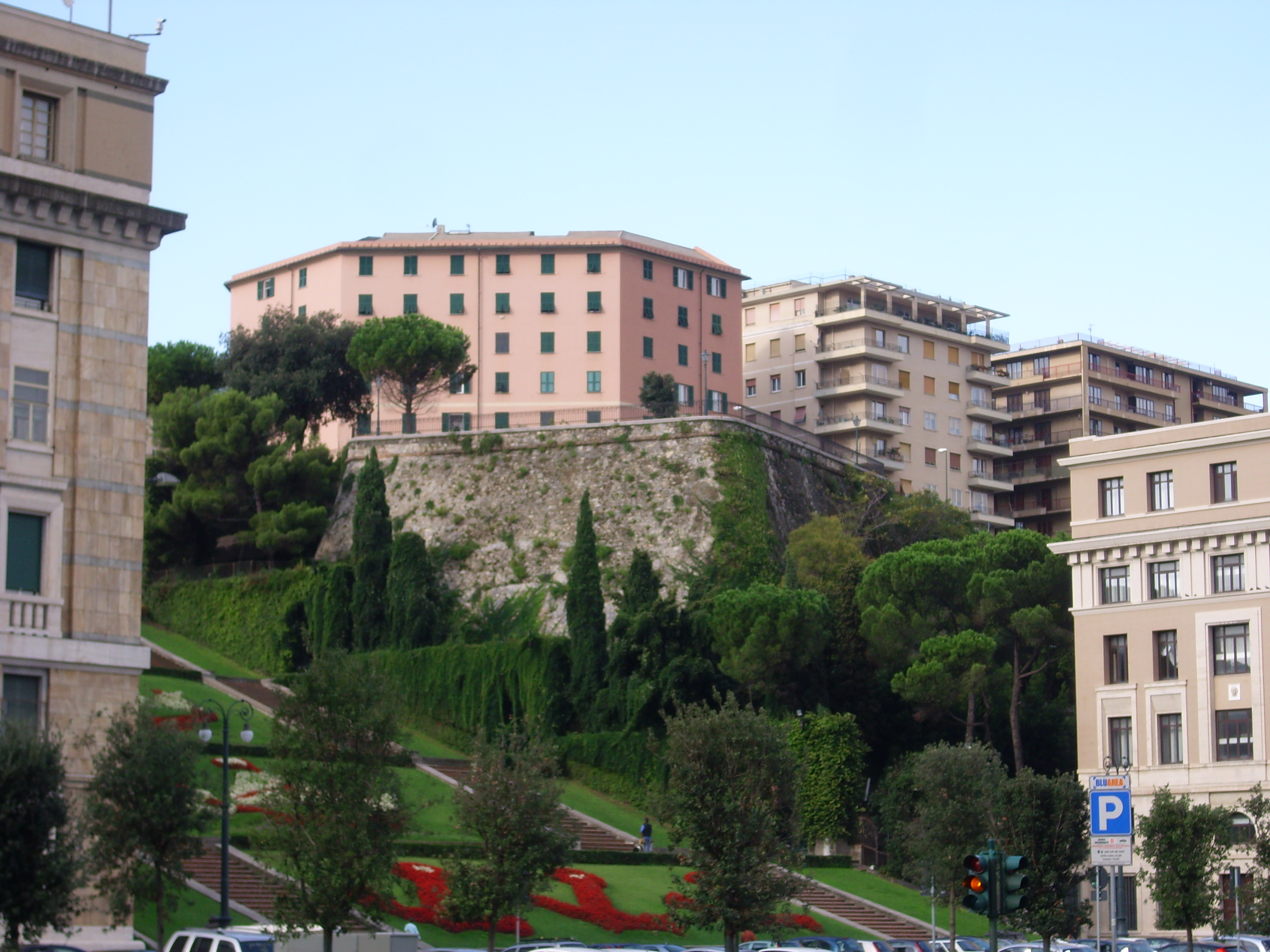
The bastion of the Capuchins, next to the Caravelle steps.

Because of its location, the hill of Carignano has several scenic belvederes, overlooking the sea or the eastern part of the city. Carignano's first public promenade was inaugurated in 1724. Following the avenues along the route of the ancient walls, there are several points, at the ancient ramparts along the St. Clare and Cappuccine walls, from which the view sweeps over the city's eastern districts and the lower Bisagno Valley.

The scenic promenade of the Cappuccine walls, once a historic viewing station of the Mura del Prato, also called Fronti Basse, the mighty embankments in the plain of the Bisagno that connected the sea fortifications with the seventeenth-century city walls, is an important lookout over the Piazza della Vittoria below, with a backdrop of the Albaro and Monte hills.

At the outlet of the seaside streets, the traffic circle of Via Corsica, the Giovine Italia knoll, and the garden of Villa Croce offer panoramic views of the harbor from the Calata delle Grazie to the International Fair, the causeway, and the sea ring road.

==== Carignano Square and adjacent streets ====
The center of the district is the large square in front of the basilica of S. Maria Assunta, dominated by the grandiose bulk of the sacred building commissioned by the Sauli family, one of Galeazzo Alessi's first Genoese works. Via Fieschi, which runs straight down to Piazza Dante, and Via Eugenia Ravasco, which connects Carignano to Sarzano via the 18th-century bridge over Via Madre di Dio, originate from the square.

From the apse of the basilica radially branch off the streets along which the urbanization of the neighborhood developed in the 19th century: Via Rivoli (1852), Via Nino Bixio (1874), and Via Galeazzo Alessi (1848).

==== Via Fieschi ====
Salita Fieschi, ancient print with the rosy elevation of the temple at the top.

— Camillo Sbarbaro, "Fuochi fatui", 1956

Via Fieschi, which connects Piazza Carignano to Piazza Dante and Via XX Settembre, straight and steeply sloping, was opened in 1868 on the areas formerly belonging to the powerful Genoese family.

Its route, already envisioned in Barabino's plan, initially ran from Carignano Square to Ponticello Square. In 1934 the terminal part, with the demolition of the Ponticello district, was extended to Via XX Settembre. The street intersected the ancient stairway of Santa Maria via Lata, which descended to the Lanaioli suburb. In the 19th century the street was characterized by elegant buildings with showy hanging verandas full of statues. With the renovations of the Via Madre di Dio district carried out in the 1970s downstream from the street, the modern executive district called the Center of Ligurians sprang up, in which the offices of the Region of Liguria and management centers of major companies have found their place.

==== Via Corsica ====
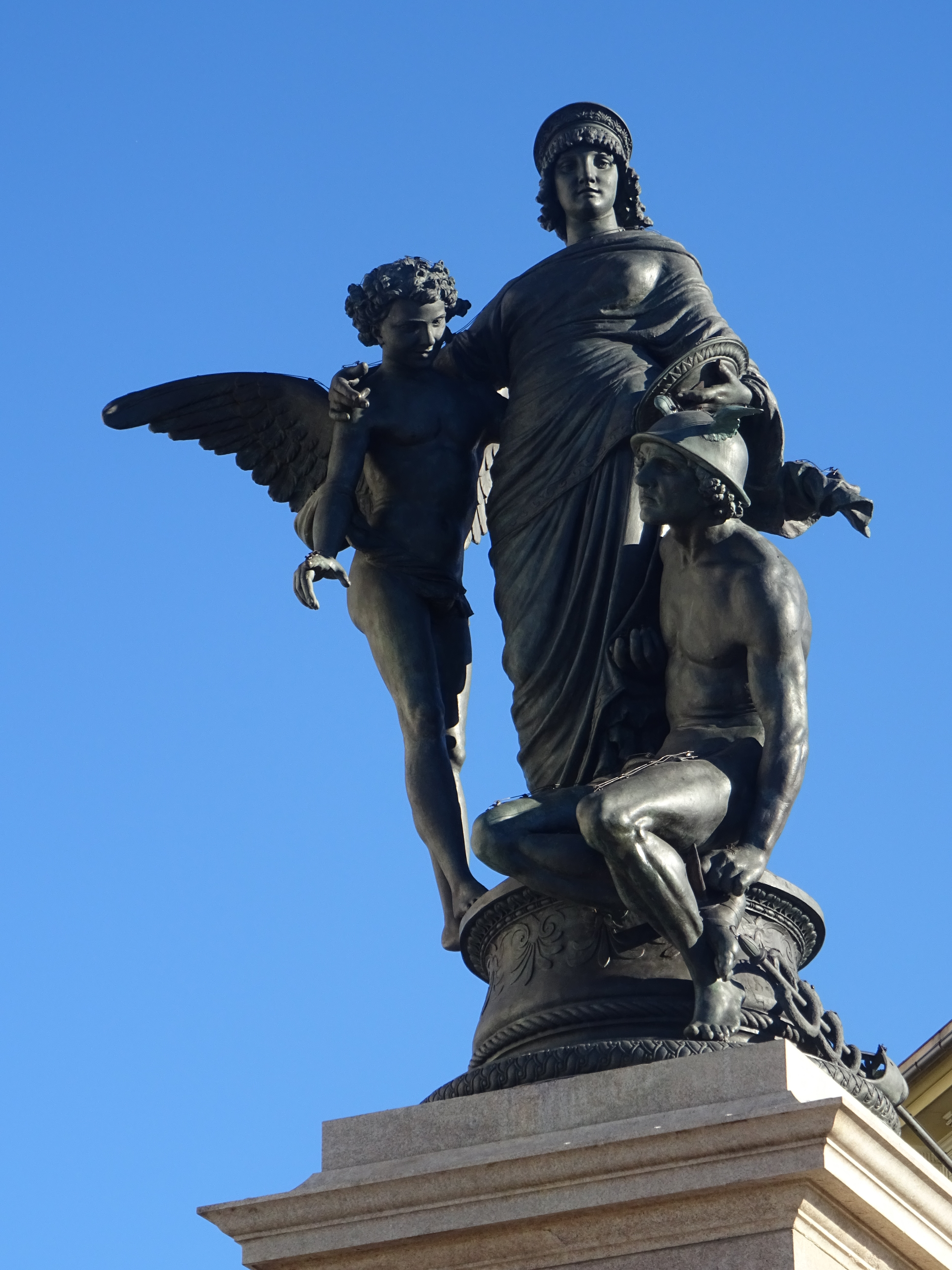
Monument to Raffaele de Ferrari, Duke of Galliera

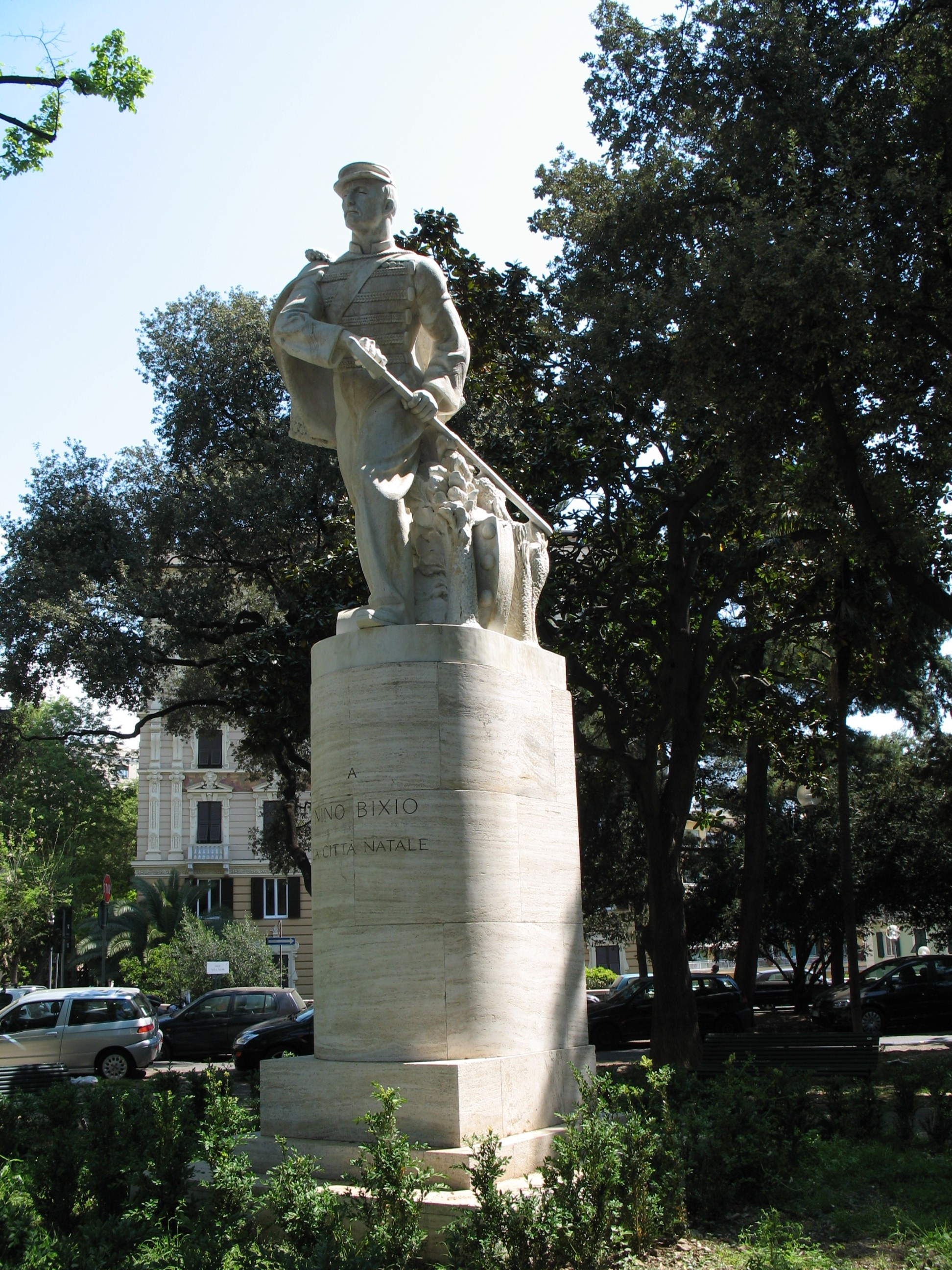
Statue to Nino Bixio on Via Corsica

Via Corsica is a tree-lined avenue, opened in 1880, which runs north-south connecting all the streets of the nineteenth-century urbanization and ends at the sea with the square named after St. Francis of Assisi, a belvedere overlooking the port area and the fairgrounds, commonly known as the Via Corsica roundabout. At the other end of the street is Piazza Galeazzo Alessi, a junction between various streets in the 19th-century district. Near Piazzale S. Francesco in 2018 the monument to Raffaele De Ferrari, by Giulio Monteverde, was relocated, once near Piazza del Principe, from where it had been removed in 1989 for traffic reasons and for many years abandoned, not without controversy, in a city hall storage room.

Halfway down Via Corsica, in the square named after shipowner Rocco Piaggio, is the monument to Nino Bixio, the work of Guido Galletti, erected in 1952 to replace the 19th-century one by Enrico Pazzi, which was destroyed by bombing in 1940. The Church of the Sacred Heart and St. James of Carignano (Luigi Rovelli, 1898) overlooks this square. At No. 4 Via Corsica was the headquarters of Italsider. The massive gray-green marble building that housed the offices of the historic steel company, designed in 1931 by Giuseppe Crosa di Vergagni, has housed a hotel since the early 2000s. On the facade of No. 6 stands the recently restored plaque in memory of Luigi Arnaldo Vassallo, better known by the pseudonym Gandolin.

==== Corso Andrea Podestà ====
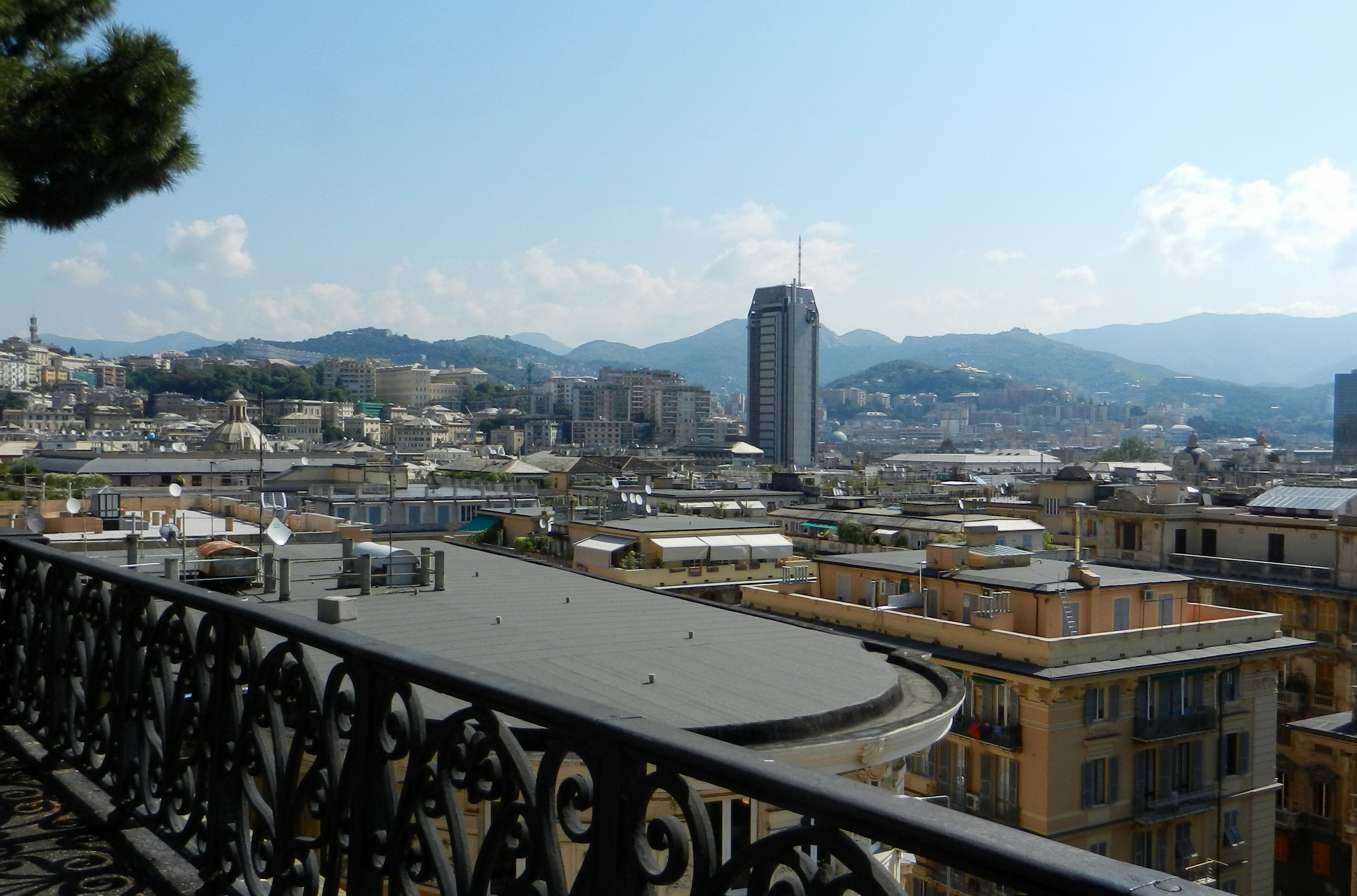
View from Corso Podestà over San Vincenzo

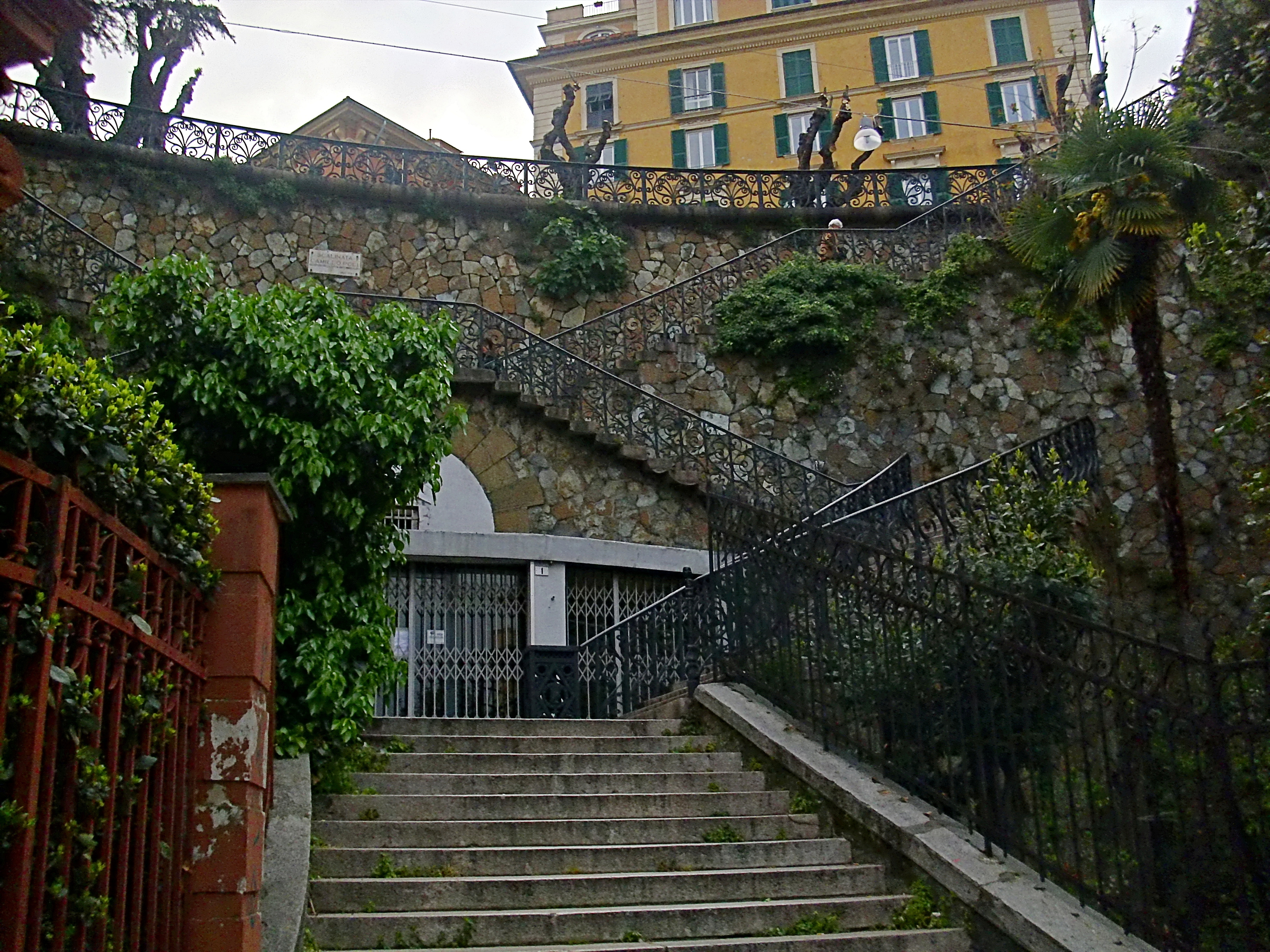
The upper part of the staircase dedicated to Camillo Poli, which connects the belvedere of Corso Podestà with Via Innocenzo Frugoni below

The street named after Baron Andrea Podestà, several times mayor of Genoa between 1866 and 1895, during the period of nineteenth-century urban expansion, connects Piazza Alessi, and then Via Corsica, to the Acquasola area and Piazza Corvetto, passing over the Ponte Monumentale, along the route of the sixteenth-century Santa Chiara walls. The road offers a panoramic view of the San Vincenzo area and the hills of the lower Val Bisagno, while from the Ponte Monumentale one can see nice views of Via XX Settembre below.

==== Sea Ring Road ====
The "Sea Ring Road" was opened in the last decade of the 19th century with fills along the cliffs that lapped the sea walls. The road, which offers panoramic views of the port, the Fair, and the Foce district along its route, is formed by Corso Maurizio Quadrio and Corso Aurelio Saffi.

The western section, corso Maurizio Quadrio, originally named after Prince Oddone of Savoy, runs from the Mura delle Grazie to the Cava crossing the area of the "seno di Giano," buried in the late 19th century, where the "sailor's house" and the Albergo Popolare stood. Corso Aurelio Saffi was originally a coastal street that went to the walls of the Strega alla Cava, skirting the ancient cemetery located near the mouth of the Bisagno River, which was abandoned around the middle of the nineteenth century after the Staglieno cemetery was built. For the widening of the street in 1891, the Oratory of the Souls in Purgatory, which stood next to the ancient burial place, was also demolished.

==== Via D'Annunzio ====
In Piazza Dante, at the base of the Piacentini Tower, begins Via D'Annunzio, which runs through the entire modern business district to the Sea Ring Road, roughly following the route of the ancient Via dei Servi and Via Madre di Dio. The street has two levels, a covered pedestrian walkway and an underlying two-lane highway connecting Corso M. Quadrio and the causeway to the city center. At the edge of Via D'Annunzio, on the slope towards Via del Colle, where there were once historic alleys, hills and small squares with characteristic names (Vico Pomogranato, Salita Boccafò, Vico Gattamora, Vico Fosse del Colle, Piazzetta dei Librai, Piazzetta Lavatoi del Colle, to name a few) a green area has been created, the so-called Park of the Walls of Barbarossa (the already mentioned Baltimore Gardens or “plastic gardens”), which preserves in some of its paths the memory of this historical toponymy, in total contrast to the looming modern architecture that surrounds it.

==== The old streets ====
Before the nineteenth-century urban development, the hill of Carignano could only be reached by steep cobblestones, the typical Ligurian creuze, some of which, such as Salita San Leonardo, Salita Santa Maria in via Lata, Via San Giacomo di Carignano, and Salita dei Sassi, have partly survived urbanization, although intersected by the modern road system. Almost nothing, however, has remained of the streets and alleys of the Hill area (between Via Madre di Dio and Via del Colle).

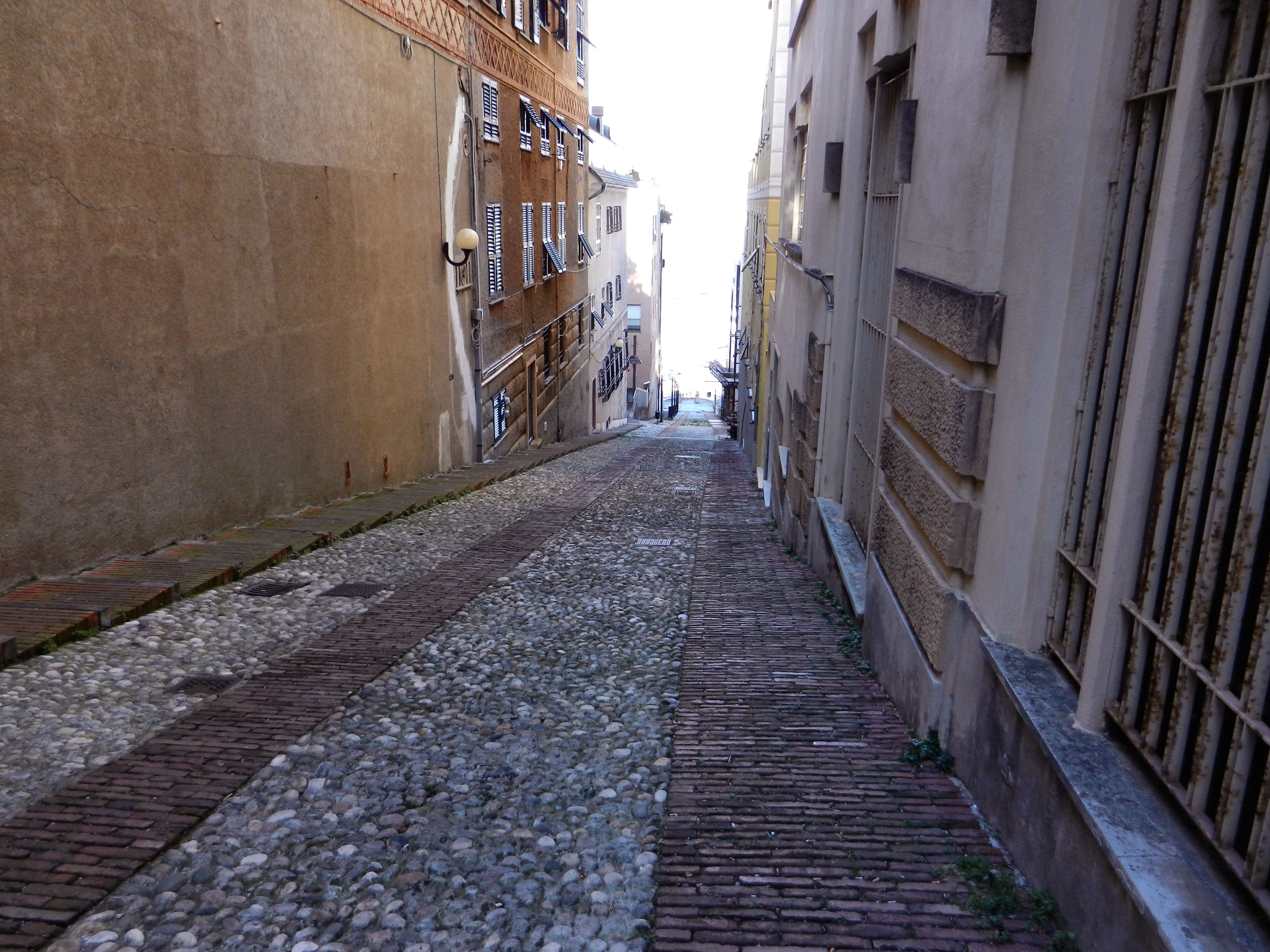
Salita dei Sassi

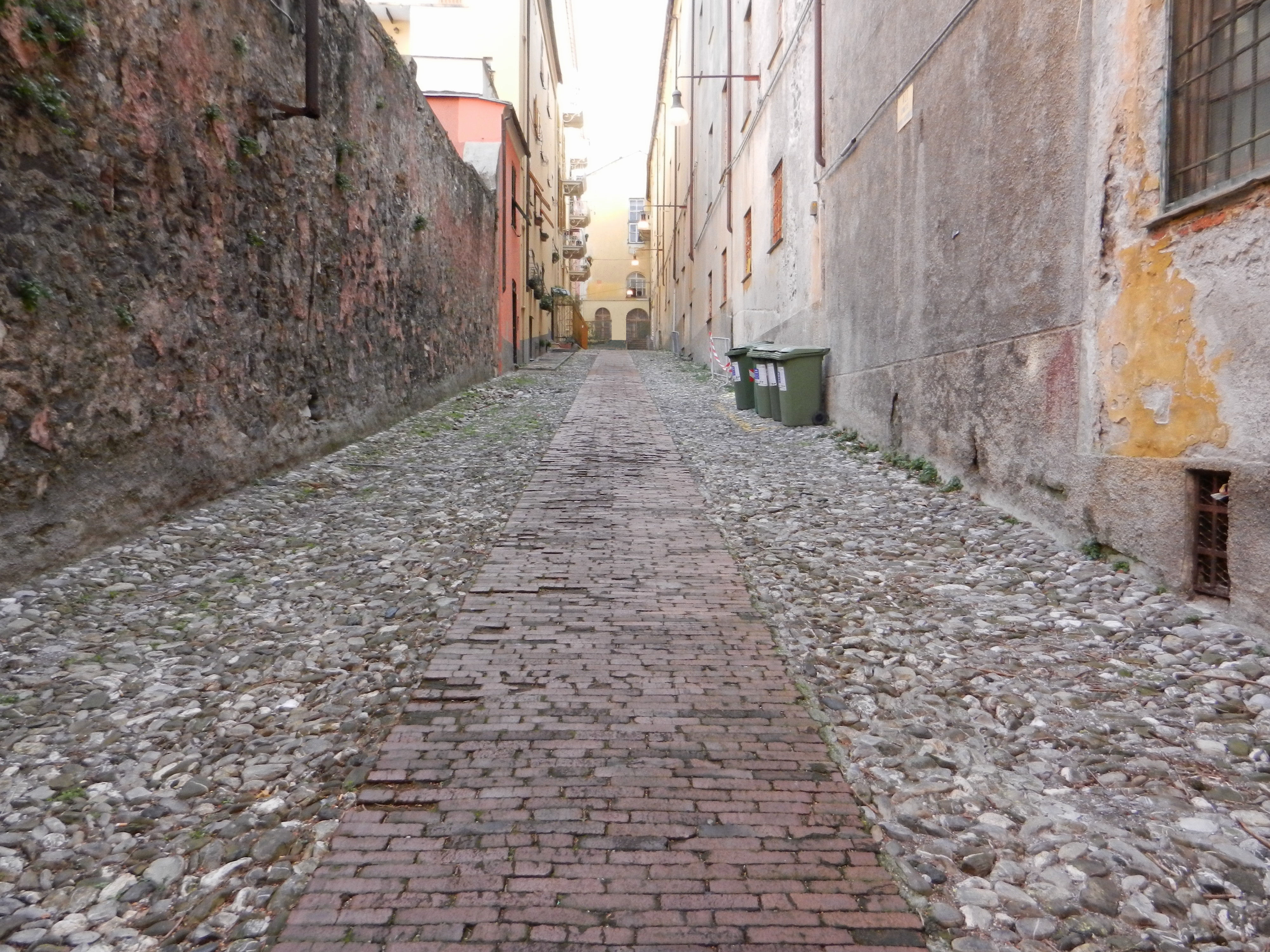
Via dei Sansone

===== Salita S. Leonardo =====
From the eastern side of Via Fieschi, in the lower section, begins Salita S. Leonardo, which connected Piazza Ponticello with the top of the hill. The slope takes its name from the convent of the same name founded by Bishop Leonardo Fieschi in 1317, now the "Andrea Doria" barracks of the Italian Army. At the top of the slope, in the small Piazza S. Leonardo stands the 17th-century complex of Sant'Ignazio, which houses one of the two Genoese branches of the State Archives.

Along the slope was once the home-workshop of the Piola family, famous painters of the Baroque period. Here around the end of the seventeenth century under the guidance of Domenico Piola many artists of various disciplines worked, creating works of art destined for churches, convents, confraternities and wealthy private homes. Until the end of the nineteenth century the Piola descendants had possession of the house, and later still for many years the modern palace that had replaced the previous building, destroyed during the war, continued to be called “casa dei Piola.” The doorway of the new building retains the marble architrave and imposts of the old palace, while on the facade a fresco by Aldo Bosco (1954) recalls the ancient family of artists.

Branching off from Salita S. Leonardo is Via dei Sansone, a secluded and quiet "creuza," once an access avenue to the convent of San Leonardo. The narrow street takes its name from an ancient family of Savona origin who had their homes here.

===== Via San Giacomo =====
It was a long alley that connected Piazza Carignano to the ancient church of San Giacomo, passing between patrician villas, peasant houses, and cultivated fields. Between 1860 and 1880 with the construction first of Via Rivoli and then of Via Corsica it remained divided into two sections. Of the alley remains the section from Via Corsica to the basilica of Carignano, which passes by Villa Sauli. The part from Via Corsica to the Poggio della Giovine Italia since World War II has been named Via Galimberti.

===== Via Madre di Dio =====
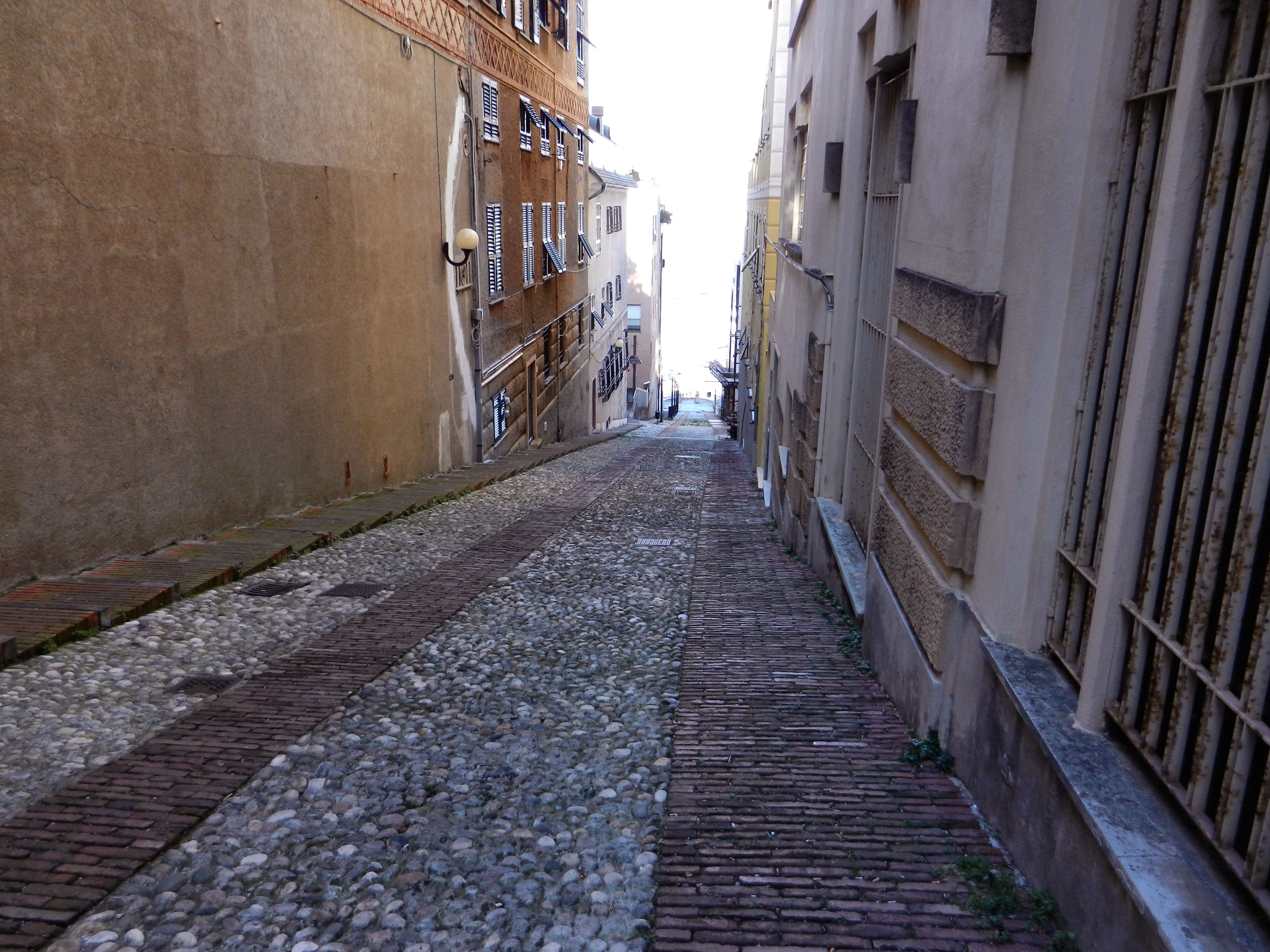
Salita dei Sassi

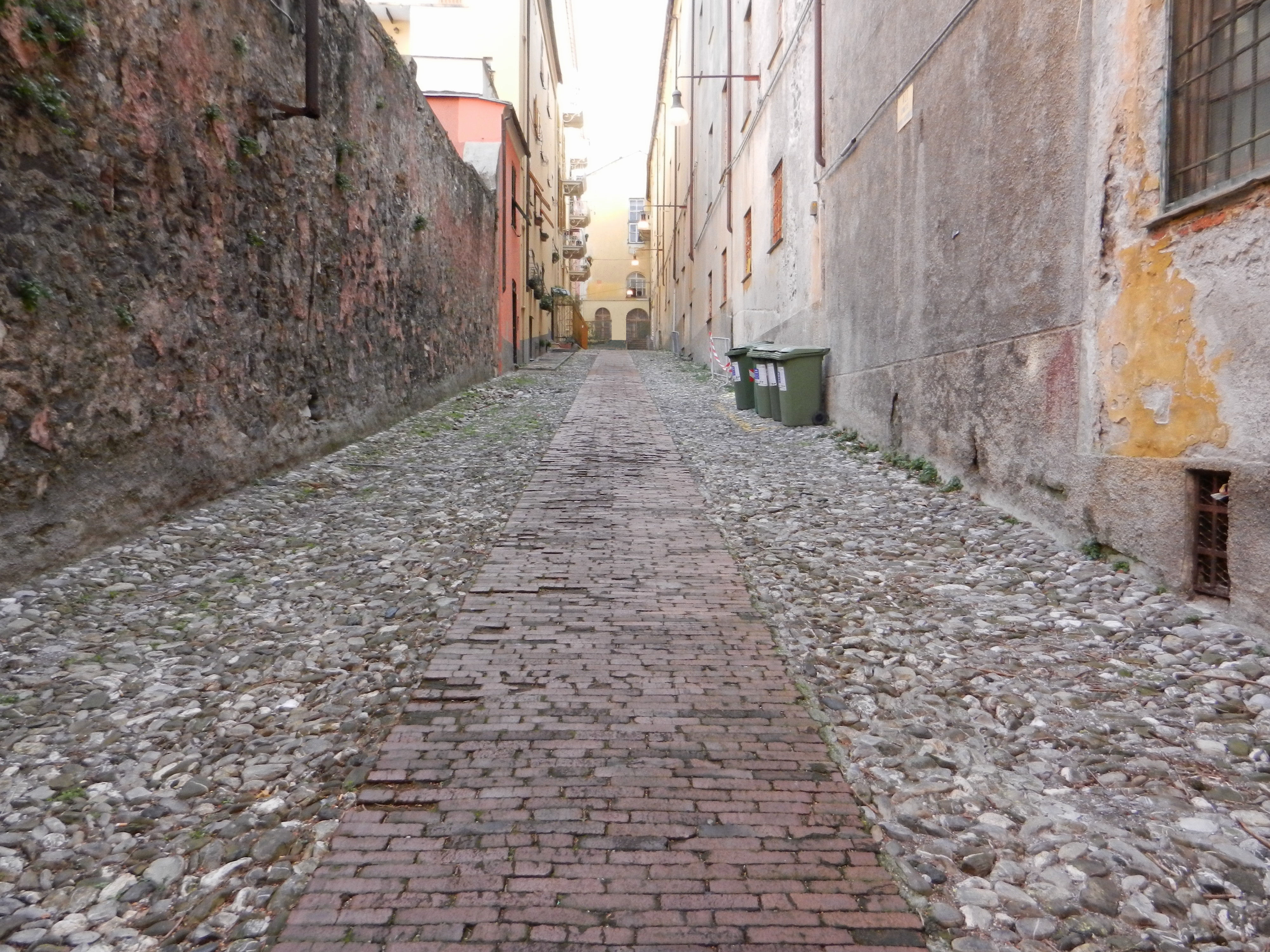
Via dei Sansone

Via Madre di Dio, named after the church of the same name, was one of the most characteristic streets in the old historic center. The street was part of the road axis that connected Ponticello Square to the sea ring road passing under the arches of the Carignano Bridge. From Via Madre di Dio branched a maze of narrow alleys and stairways that connected it to Via Fieschi and Via del Colle, on opposite sides of the Rivo Torbido valley. The district, half-destroyed by World War II bombings, disappeared completely in the 1970s. A short section of Via Madre di Dio remains, corresponding to the stretch shown in the image opposite, used as a junction between the Via D'Annunzio tunnel and Corso Quadrio.

The street was inhabited by working class people, and most of the men worked in the port. Numerous and busy were the osterie, the men's meeting place mainly for playing cards or morra. Voices, shouts and noises resounded from dawn until late in the evening, as recounted by the poet Steva De Franchi, who thus described the atmosphere of the neighborhood in the eighteenth century: “My daughter! Here there is no peace, neither by day nor by night. A thousand voices resound from morning, as soon as dawn comes, until evening. To dazzle you, the milkwoman begins to shout: pure milk...,” concluding, after recalling gradually all the artisans and vendors who enlivened the street, "My head is banging like a drum because of all the noise and people shouting!"

===== Via del Colle =====
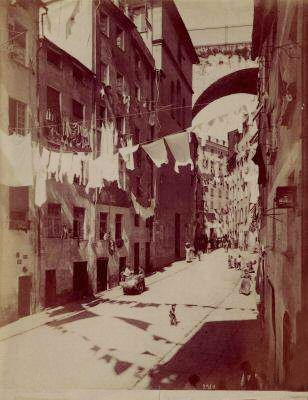
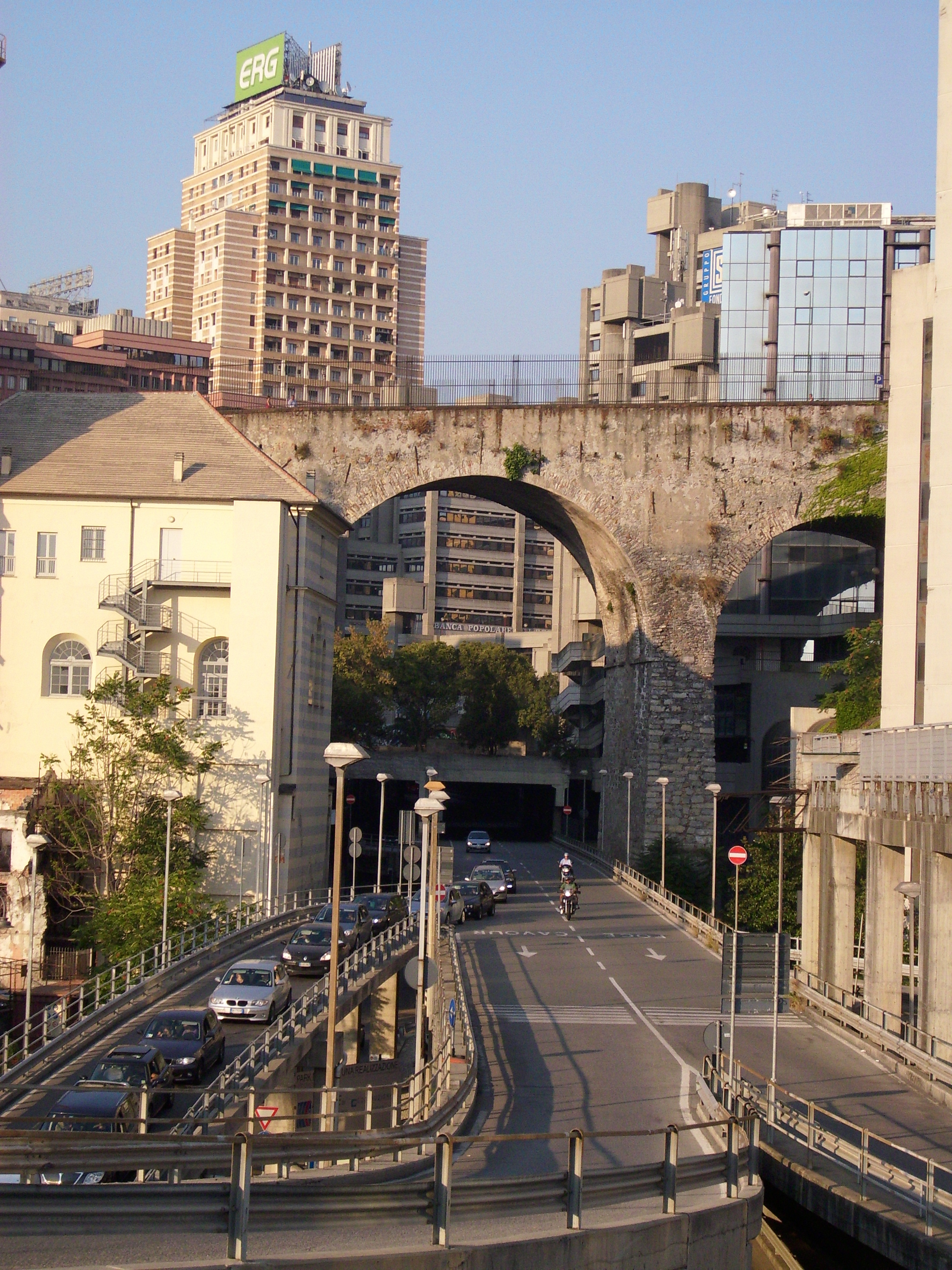
On the left Via Madre di Dio, late nineteenth-century picture by Alfred Noack. On the right, the same spot in the nineteenth-century photo as it looks today: of the buildings of the past, the Madre di Dio Church and the Carignano Bridge remain.

Via del Colle (in Genoese, A Cheullia) from the Carignano bridge to the Porta Soprana follows the route of the walls on the top of the hill to the right of the Torbido rivulet and demarcates the Carignano area from the Molo area. The street, passing outside the walls, overlooks the valley below with the complex of buildings of the business center. Unlike Via Madre di Dio, some houses on Via del Colle have been preserved and restored, while others have been rebuilt in their original forms. The oldest houses dated back to the 15th century, after the “Barbarossa” city wall had been decommissioned, and had grown over the following centuries to create throughout the hillside a labyrinth of alleys.

=== Civil architecture ===
==== Carignano Bridge ====
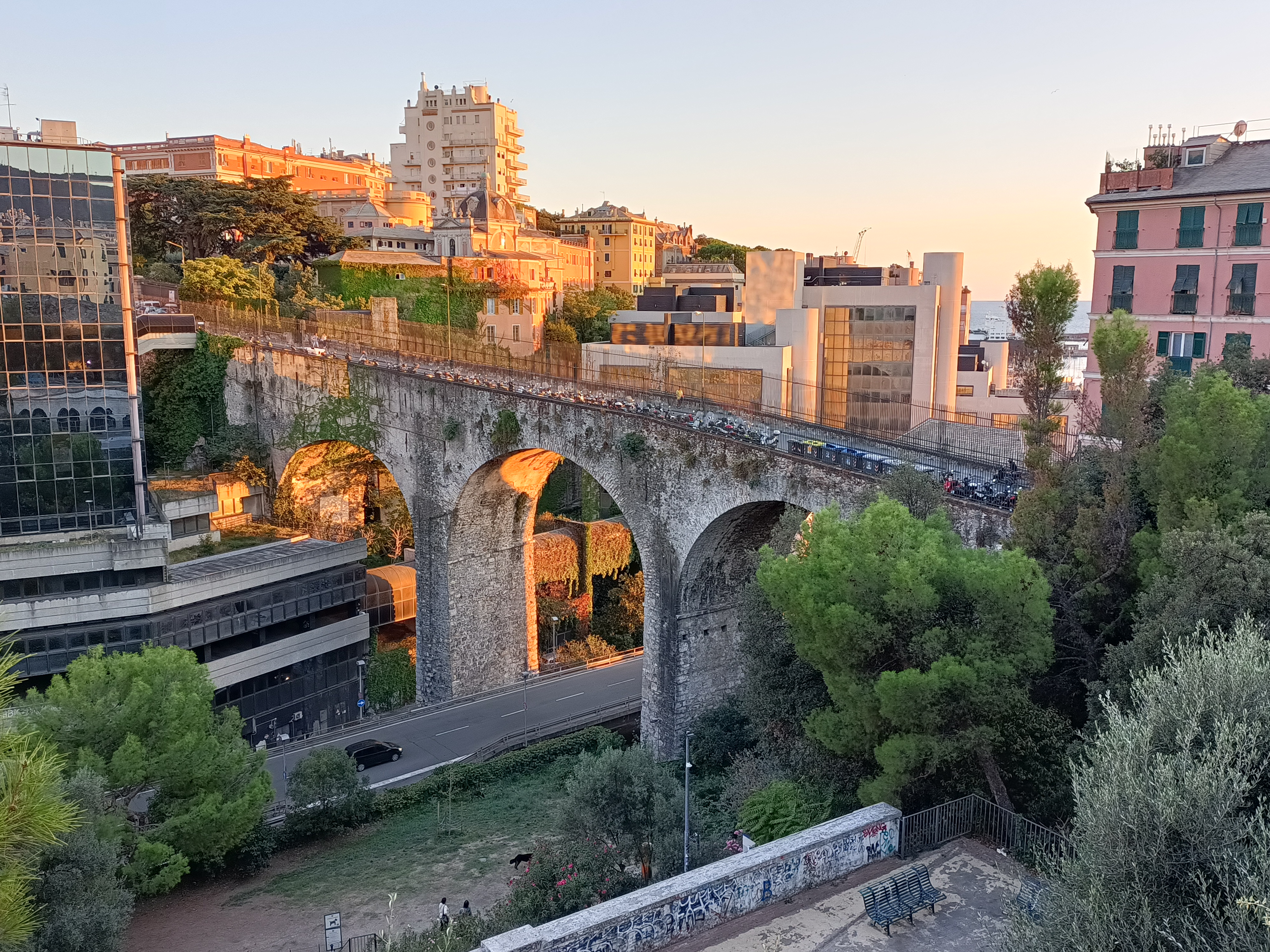
Carignano Bridge as seen from via del Colle

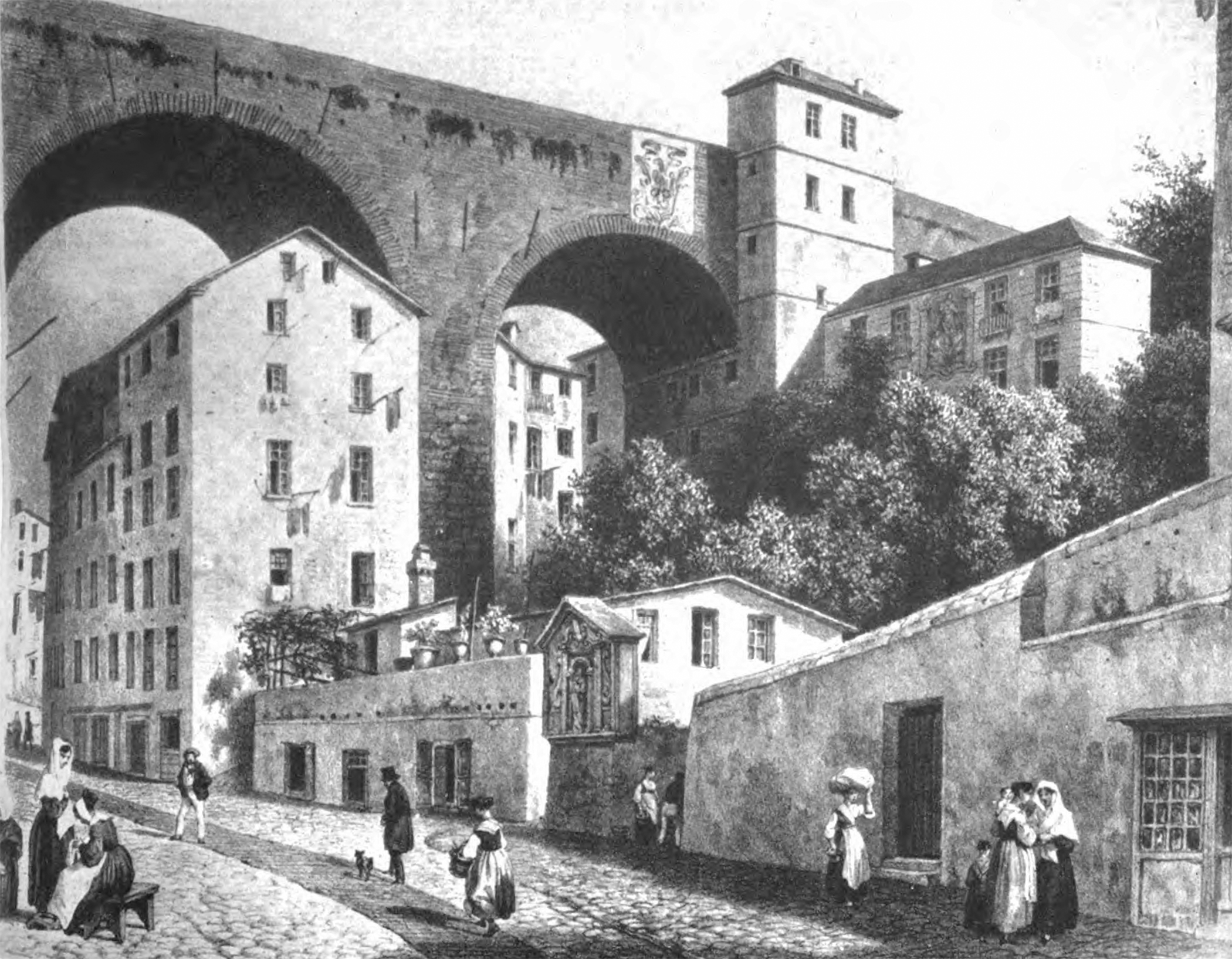
Carignano Bridge and the area of Via Madre di Dio in the first half of the 19th century

The bridge connecting the Sarzano and Carignano hills, bypassing the Rivo Torbido valley, was built between 1718 and 1724. Commissioned by the Sauli family, which financed its construction, as an access route to the basilica, it was the final section of a representative route that went from the Doge's Palace up to Sarzano, concluding in front of the great Alessian basilica, which, with its façade, renovated in those very years, formed the scenic backdrop.

The project had originally been commissioned by Domenico Sauli to the Brescian architect Giovanni Bassignani (1653-1717), but he gave it up by passing it on to one of his collaborators, the Frenchman Gerard De Langlade; it consists of four arches, three of which bypass Via Madre di Dio. A plaque commemorates the merchant Giulio Cesare Drago, who in 1877 had the gates still present on the bridge's parapets built at his own expense to prevent numerous suicide attempts.

The bridge is one of the few remaining ancient structures in the Rivo Torbido valley, and overlooks the modern business center. The road junctions that have replaced the ancient Via Madre di Dio no longer allow the great height of its arches to be appreciated as it once was. The street that passes over the bridge is named after Eugenia Ravasco, foundress of the Daughters of the Sacred Hearts of Jesus and Mary, whose educational institution is located in Carignano Square, next to the entrance of the bridge.

==== Galliera Hospital ====
Galliera (or S. Andrea) Hospital, Genoa's second hospital complex after S. Martino, was founded in 1878 by Marquise Maria Brignole Sale De Ferrari, Duchess of Galliera. Built to a design by Cesare Parodi, it was inaugurated on March 4, 1888. The hospital occupies the area of a former convent of Capuchin Poor Clares that gave its name to the nearby section of the city walls.

The building, whose façade is 270 m long, consists of two overlapping galleries with large glass walls and marble floors, into which seven pavilions fan out. In the 1960s new modern buildings were added to the existing ones. In the chapel are frescoes by Nicolò Barabino, depicting stories from the life of St. Andrew the Apostle.

==== Berio Library (former archiepiscopal seminary) ====
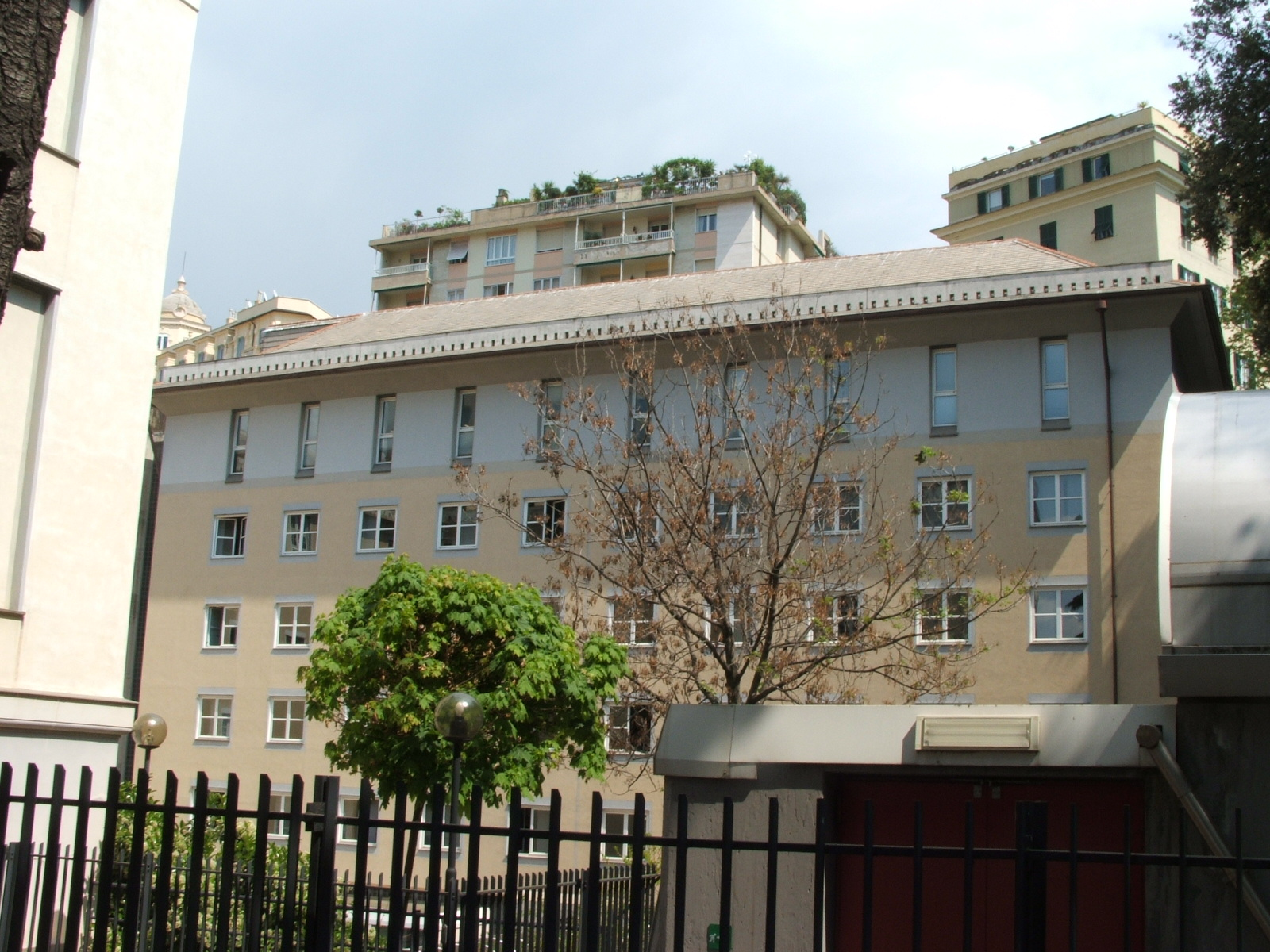
The 19th-century wing of the former major seminary, home of the Berio Library

The building in which the library is housed is located on Via Porta d'Archi, a short distance from the central Piazza Dante. It was built in the 17th century at the behest of Archbishop Stefano Durazzo and with contributions from numerous citizens to house the archbishop's seminary.

The building, built in a deliberately sober style, designed by Gerolamo Gandolfo with the assistance of Pier Antonio Corradi and Antonio Torriglia, was inaugurated in 1657. It was enlarged on two occasions during the 19th century. The building was not directly affected by the work to implement the urban plan that radically transformed the entire surrounding area in the 1930s, with the elimination of the Ponticello neighborhood and the opening of Via Dante, Piazza Dante, and the Cristoforo Colombo gallery just below the palace garden. On the other hand, the building suffered severe damage during World War II when the 19th-century east wing was destroyed by aerial bombardment.

In 1970 the seminary was moved to a new facility on the Righi Heights. The building, which remained in a state of neglect until the mid-1980s, was identified by the City of Genoa as the site for the civic library, which took up residence there in 1998 after a lengthy restoration conducted between 1985 and 1992 to a design by architect Piero Gambacciani. The Berio library, founded by Abbot Carlo Giuseppe Vespasiano Berio in 1775, was previously housed in the Palazzo dell'Accademia ligustica di belle arti, in Piazza De Ferrari.

==== Genoa State Archives (former convent of S. Ignazio) ====
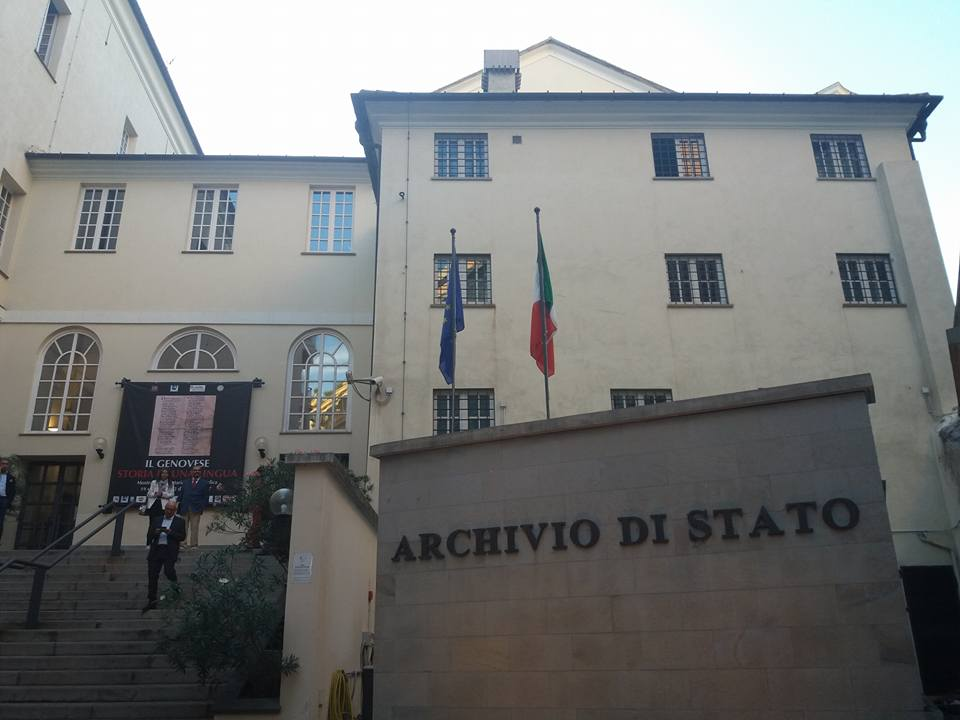
The former convent of S. Ignazio, home of the Genoa State Archives

The S. Ignazio complex, overlooking the small S. Leonardo square, consists of several buildings from different eras. The oldest nucleus is a medieval villa, from the 15th century owned by the de Franceschi family, located behind the church of S. Maria in Via Lata.

Enlarged in the second half of the 16th century, when a fresco depicting the Rape of the Sabine women was painted by Andrea Semini in the main-floor hall, in 1659 it was purchased by the Jesuits, who made it the seat of their novitiate, transferring it from the previous Paverano location. The fresco was rediscovered during recent restoration work because the Jesuits, considering the subject too profane, had it covered with a coat of lime.

Between 1676 and 1683, the Jesuits enlarged the building, making new wings intended to accommodate the novices, and around 1720, the church, named after the founder St. Ignatius, was built to a design by Giovanni Battista Ricca of Oneglia. Overlooking St. Leonard's Square, the church has an unadorned facade and lacks an entrance open to the outside, being intended exclusively for the service of the novitiate.

In 1773 the complex passed to the Augustinian nuns. Closed in 1810 due to the laws of suppression of religious orders it was converted into barracks, with heavy remodeling to the structures. After World War I, the “St. Ignatius barracks” was renamed “Piave barracks.” The complex, which could accommodate up to 500 soldiers, was used as barracks until World War II, when it had to be abandoned due to severe bombing damage.

In 1986, based on a project by Angelo Sibilla, a long renovation project began, completed only in 2004, to turn it into the headquarters of the Genoa State Archives, where 25,000 documents are kept, the oldest of which dates back to 1154, relating to purchase and sale contracts, insurance, company constitutions, wills and inventories, which are fundamental for reconstructing the economic history of the Republic of Genoa.

The 16th-century villa, the heart of the entire complex, and which in addition to the aforementioned frescoes features interesting architectural elements, such as the loggia and the star vaulting of the staircase, represents a significant example of villa architecture prior to the arrival in Genoa of Galeazzo Alessi, whose unmistakable style would revolutionize the structure of Genoese patrician residences.

Before the complex was converted into a barracks, notable works of art were preserved in the church, including paintings depicting “Saint Ignatius,” by Grechetto, “Death of Saint Stanislaus” and “Madonna Handing the Child to Saint Aloysius,” by Lorenzo De Ferrari, and “Conception of the Virgin,” attributed to Jesuit Andrea Pozzo.

==== Villa Croce ====
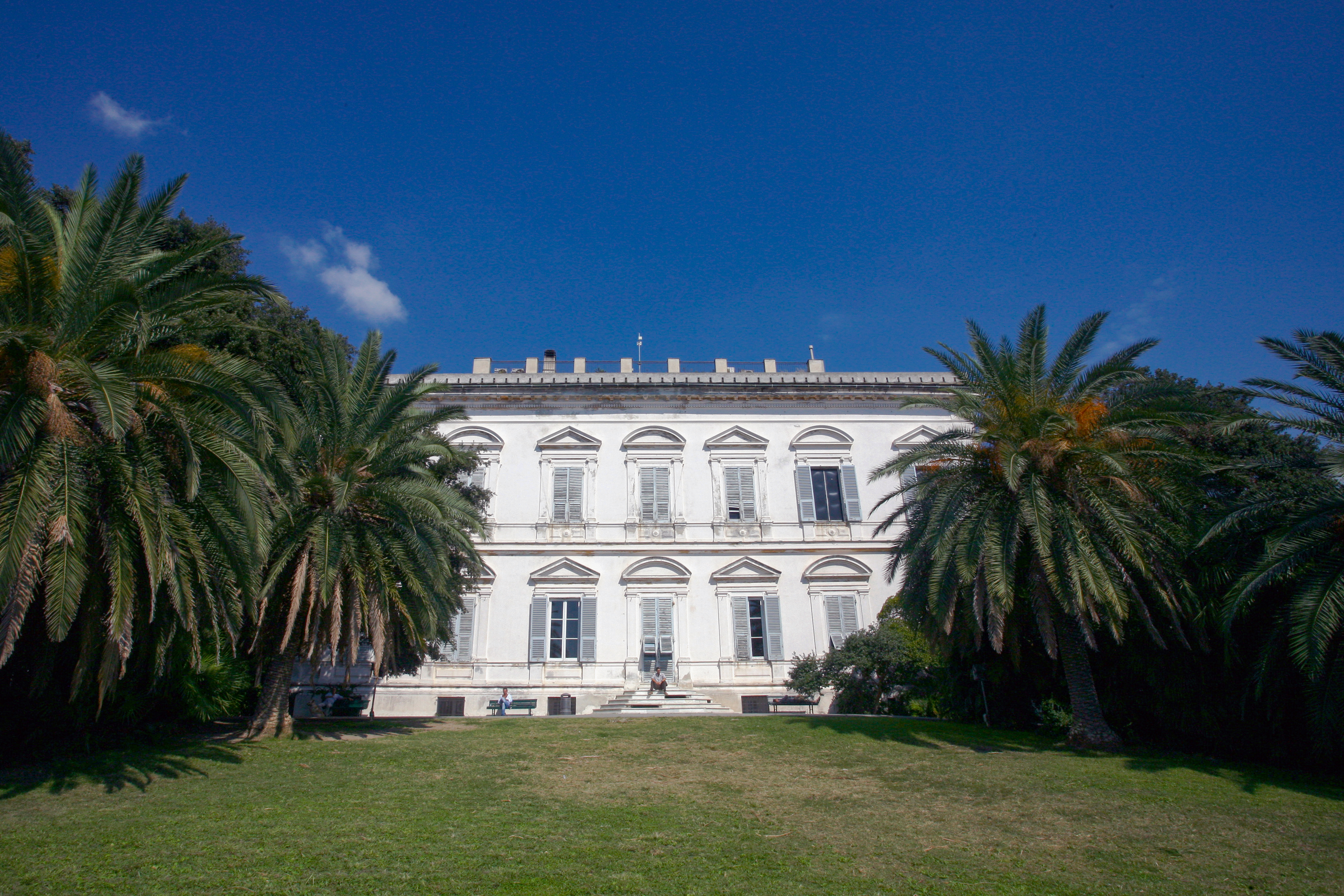
Villa Croce

At the center of a public park overlooking Corso Aurelio Saffi and the fairgrounds with its panoramic belvedere, Villa Croce is a 19th-century villa in neoclassical style, built on behalf of Giovanni Giacomo Croce on an earlier building that belonged to the Spinola family. Donated in 1952 by the Croce family to the municipality of Genoa, with the constraint of making it a museum, since 1985 the villa has been home to the Villa Croce Museum of Contemporary Art, whose artistic heritage includes more than 3,000 works including paintings, sculptures, collages and photographs, including the important Maria Cernuschi Ghiringhelli collection, with more than two hundred works by some important Italian artists from early abstractionism to the 1980s. One section is devoted to Ligurian artists of the second half of the 20th century. The museum also exhibits a rich collection of works by Sandro Cherchi and graphic works by various contemporary master engravers.

==== Villa Mylius - Figari ====
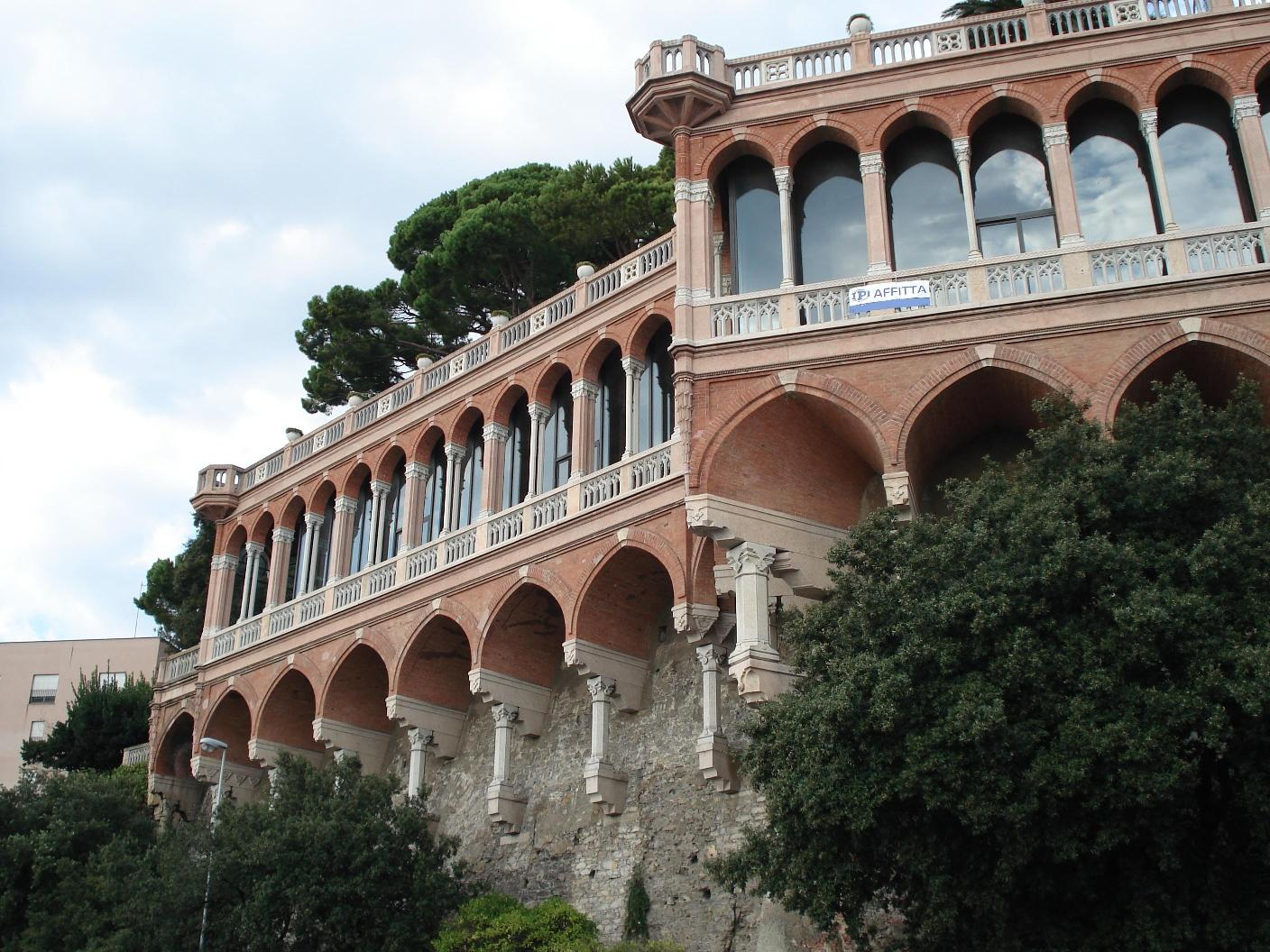
The loggia of Villa Mylius from Corso Aurelio Saffi

Villa Figari, better known as Villa Mylius, is a neo-Gothic style residence, built in 1855 a short distance from the Alessian basilica, whose garden overlooks Corso Aurelio Saffi with an elegant loggia-belvedere; built on the structure of the ancient walls of S. Margherita, this loggia was originally suspended on the cliffs that bordered the hill of Carignano by the sea.

Named after the Swiss-born entrepreneur Federico Mylius (1838-1892), who gathered there a valuable collection of works of art and other artifacts from churches and historic buildings that were demolished in the 19th century and later dispersed. It is still a private residence.

==== Villa Sauli ====
The villa of the powerful Sauli family, who had the basilica of Carignano built, is located along Via S. Giacomo. Attributed to Alessi, it was built toward the end of the 16th century; remodeled several times, it lost much of its garden in 1880 for the opening of Via Corsica. Restored in the early 20th century by Luigi Rovelli, it was almost completely destroyed by bombing during World War II. The villa, of which the perimeter walls and a few interior rooms remained, was rebuilt after the war for residential use, respecting the volumes and structures of the original building.

Between 1866 and 1877 it was rented as a summer residence by Giuseppe Verdi, who composed part of Aida here. From 1878 the composer moved to the Villa del Principe.

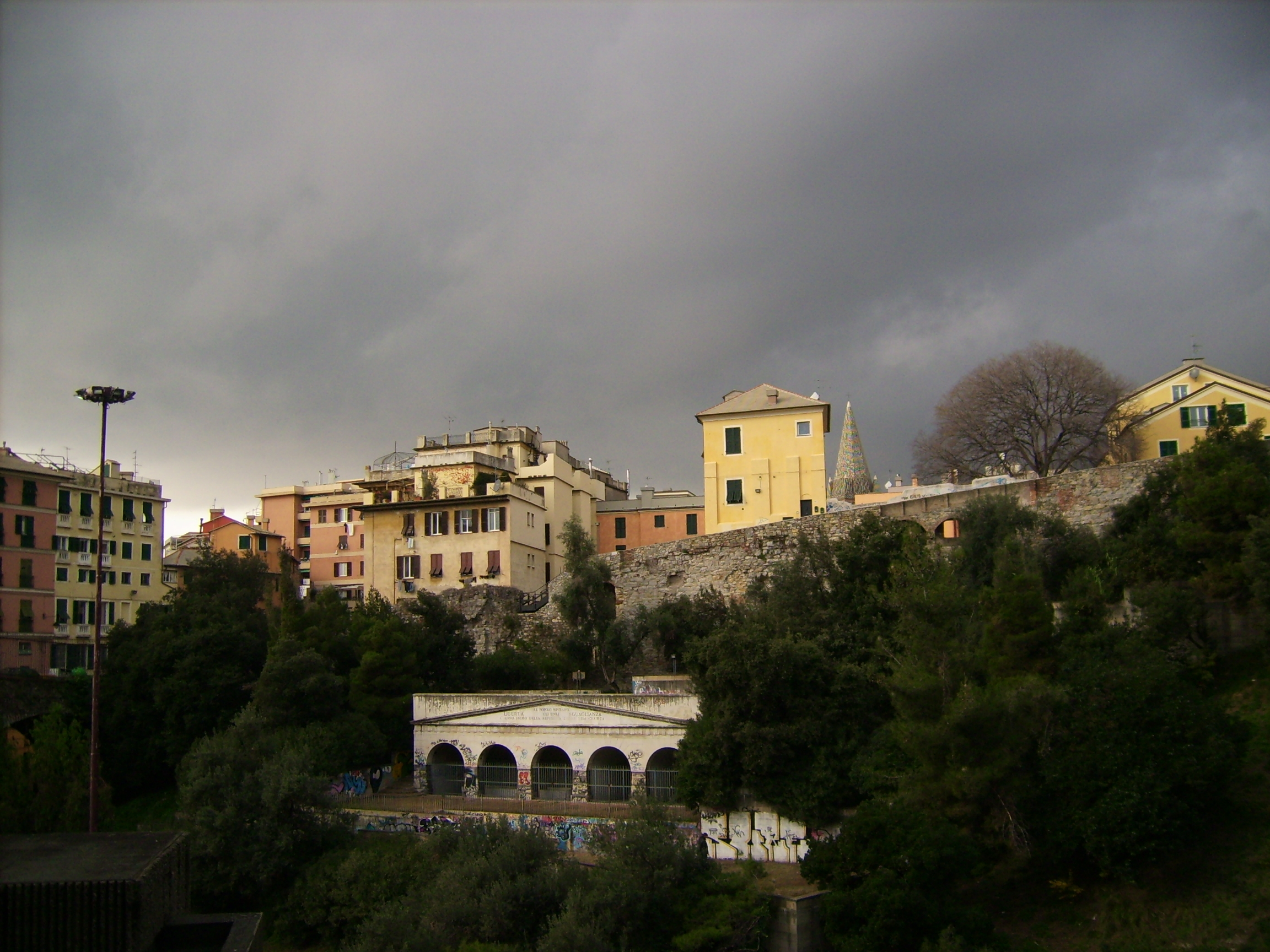
The wash-houses of the Servi, known as the Barabino's, in their new location at the base of the walls of the Colle

==== Barabino's wash houses ====
In the upper part of the urban park of the Walls (Baltimore Gardens) the monumental “lavatoi dei Servi” have been reconstructed. Built in 1797, they were located next to the church of Santa Maria dei Servi, where after World War II the “Center of Ligurians” was built. With the demolition of the district, they were dismantled and reassembled under Via del Colle, where the small square of the "lavatoi del Colle," an early 20th-century structure, used to be, with the intention of creating an "urban park" that would enclose in a green area the remains of the Barbarossa walls together with the architectural elements saved from demolition such as precisely the historic public lavatories of Via dei Servi, commissioned by the Ligurian Republic.

Setting aside an earlier design by Giacomo Brusco, the new democratic government commissioned Carlo Barabino, who built an elaborate neoclassical structure next to the Servi church. The pediment bears the Jacobin-inspired inscription, “To the Sovereign People - Liberty - Equality - The Builders the First Year of the Democratic Ligurian Republic MDCCXCVII.”

=== Religious architecture ===
Vanished religious buildings

The urban expansion of the district and war events caused the disappearance of some historic churches in the Carignano area, in addition to those attached to the various convents, traces of which remain in the toponymy.

- St. James Church. The church of St. James, founded in 1154, stood where the “Poggio della Giovine Italia” is now. In 1536 it passed to the Augustinians, who remained there until the suppression of 1798, when the church returned to the secular clergy The old church was closed to worship in 1890 and demolished in 1905. Its parish title was transferred to the new church dedicated to the Sacred Heart and St. James, built not far away. Until 1871 the bodies of the condemned executed in the nearby Quarry esplanade were thrown into a communal well in the church's basement.
- Church of St. Margaret. At the foot of the hill of Carignano, near the “salita dei Sassi,” stood the church of S. Margherita known as “della Rocchetta.” On this site from 1359 stood a convent of Cistercian nuns, who abandoned it in 1535. In the 18th century the now ruined building was purchased by the brotherhood of merchants, who rebuilt it for the daughters of their associates who wished to consecrate themselves to religious life and established the oratory of Saints Bernardine and Alexis. The nuns, who had been subject to the Salesian rule since 1758, left the convent in 1822 when it, acquired by the municipality of Genoa, became the seat of the municipal guards, but the church was still officiated for many years by a confraternity. On the site of the complex, which was destroyed during World War II, stands a modern building housing various municipal offices. In the church were paintings by Bartolomeo Guidobono (S. Margherita, preserved in Palazzo Bianco), Domenico Fiasella (The Refusal of Joachim's Offering to the Temple, transferred to the Montoggio parish church) and Domenico Piola (Saints Bernardino and Alessio in Contemplation of Mary).
- Church of S. Maria dei Servi. The church of S. Maria dei Servi stood on the street of the same name and was also destroyed by bombing in World War II; what was left of it was demolished in the 1970s to build the “Center of Ligurians” office complex. What it was possible to salvage of furnishings and works of art was transferred, together with the parish title, to the new church of S. Maria dei Servi, on Cecchi Street in the Foce district, built in 1959. The church had been erected in 1327 at the edge of the Rivo Torbido and was therefore called S. Maria di Rio Torbido. It was later named after the religious of the order of the Servants of Mary, to whom it was entrusted, who remained there continuously until its demolition and who still officiate at the new church in La Foce. In 1393 a confraternity had been established in this church to which foreigners living in Genoa belonged, and for this reason it was called the “confraternity of Our Lady of Mercy of Foreigners.” In 1797 the parish title was transferred there from the church of S. Andrea della Porta, which was closed due to Napoleonic suppressions and turned into a prison. From this church came the panel depicting St. Andrew, from the school of Antonio Semino and Teramo Piaggio. Also kept there were works by Domenico Piola (S. Filippo Benizzi, Santa Barbara and S. Giuliana Falconieri), Giovanni Andrea De Ferrari (Assumption and S. Andrea), Bernardo Castello (San Francesco da Paola) and others; some of these works are in the Foce church. The ancient parish registers, on the other hand, are preserved in the two parish churches of Carignano.

There are two Catholic parish churches in the Carignano area, which are part of the “Carignano - Foce” vicariate of the Archdiocese of Genoa. In addition to these there remain two historic religious buildings that are no longer used as places of worship, Santa Maria in Via Lata, an ancient abbey of the Fieschi family, and the Church of the Mother of God, home of the Franzoniana Library.

==== Basilica of Santa Maria Assunta in Carignano ====
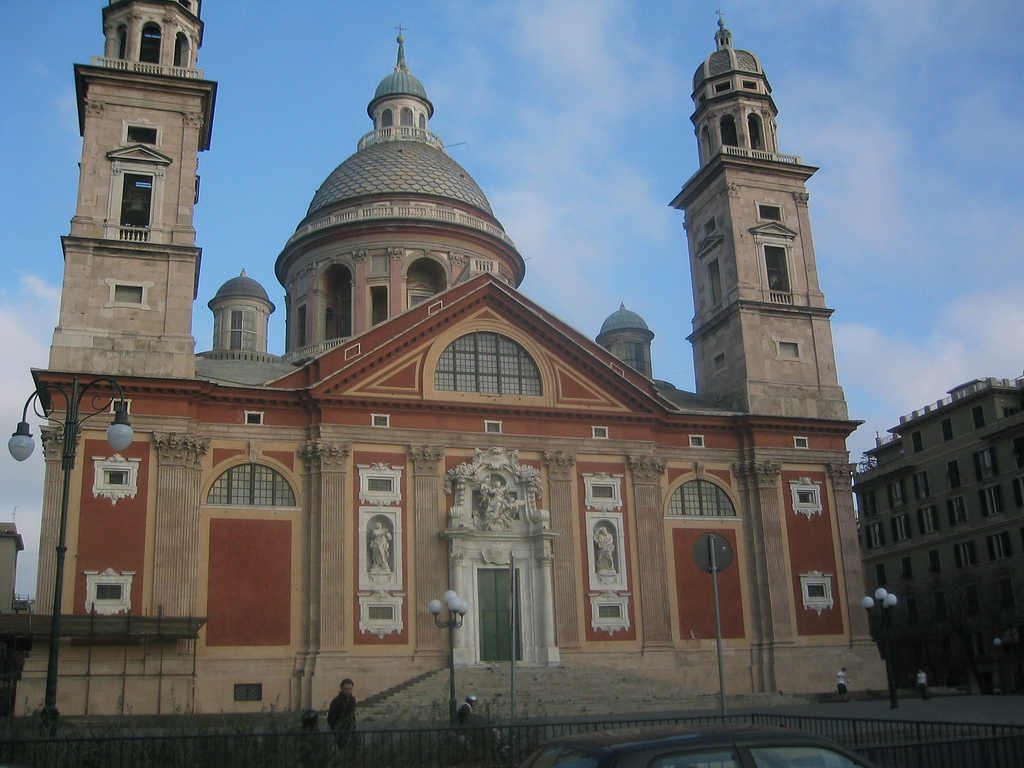
The basilica of Carignano

The basilica of Santa Maria Assunta, designed by Galeazzo Alessi, is the best known public building in the district and one of the best examples of Renaissance architecture in the city.

The church, which towers at the top of the Carignano hill, was built as the aristocratic church of the Sauli family, by the will of Bandinello Sauli, who in his will of October 17, 1481, provided for the creation of a special fund at the Bank of Saint George. Construction, which began around the middle of the 16th century, continued until the beginning of the following century, but new work was also carried out in the following centuries, so much so that in popular language the expression "A l'è comme a fabrica de Caignan" ("it's like the building of Carignano") became proverbial to indicate a never-ending undertaking. In 1939 it became a territorial parish and in 1951 it was consecrated as a minor basilica.

The building has a Greek cross plan, with a large central dome and four small domes at the corners. Characteristic of the church are the four identical elevations on each side, while of the four bell towers planned in Alessi's design, only the two at the main façade were built. The interior has white walls, decorated with lesenes that echo the motif of the exterior decoration. The vaults have coffered ceilings.

Numerous works of art can be found inside. Notable also for their size are the statues of saints placed in the center of the church and on the main facade, by Claude David, Pierre Puget and Filippo Parodi. At the altars are canvases by famous 17th-century painters, including Domenico Piola, Luca Cambiaso, Domenico Fiasella and Guercino. The organ is valuable, a remake by the organ builders Bianchi (1853) and Lingiardi (1905) of the original 17th-century organ by Willem Hermans.

==== Church of the Sacred Heart and St. James of Carignano ====
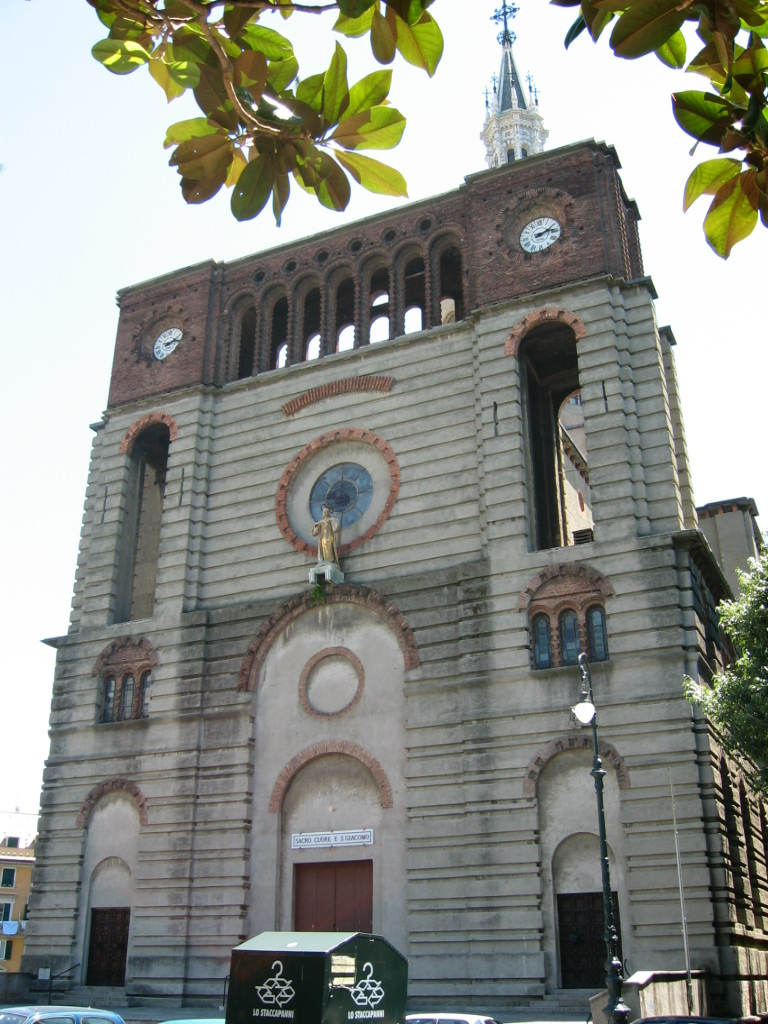
The facade of the Church of the Sacred Heart and St. James in Carignano

The Church of the Sacred Heart and St. James of Carignano was built between 1892 and 1914 to a design by Luigi Rovelli, in the square then named after Nino Bixio. The original design underwent radical changes during construction. In 1896 the large crypt hall was completed, where the church temporarily began to function. Between 1902 and 1914 above this room, which has housed the Teatro Carignano since 1969, the church proper was raised, decorated in the 1920s, when the altars were also made.

In neo-Romanesque style, it has an imposing facade, terminated at the top by a loggia with two clocks on either side. The church is topped by a tall octagonal dome culminating in the imposing spire. The interior has three naves, separated by paired columns, with four side altars.

==== Church of Santa Maria via Lata ====
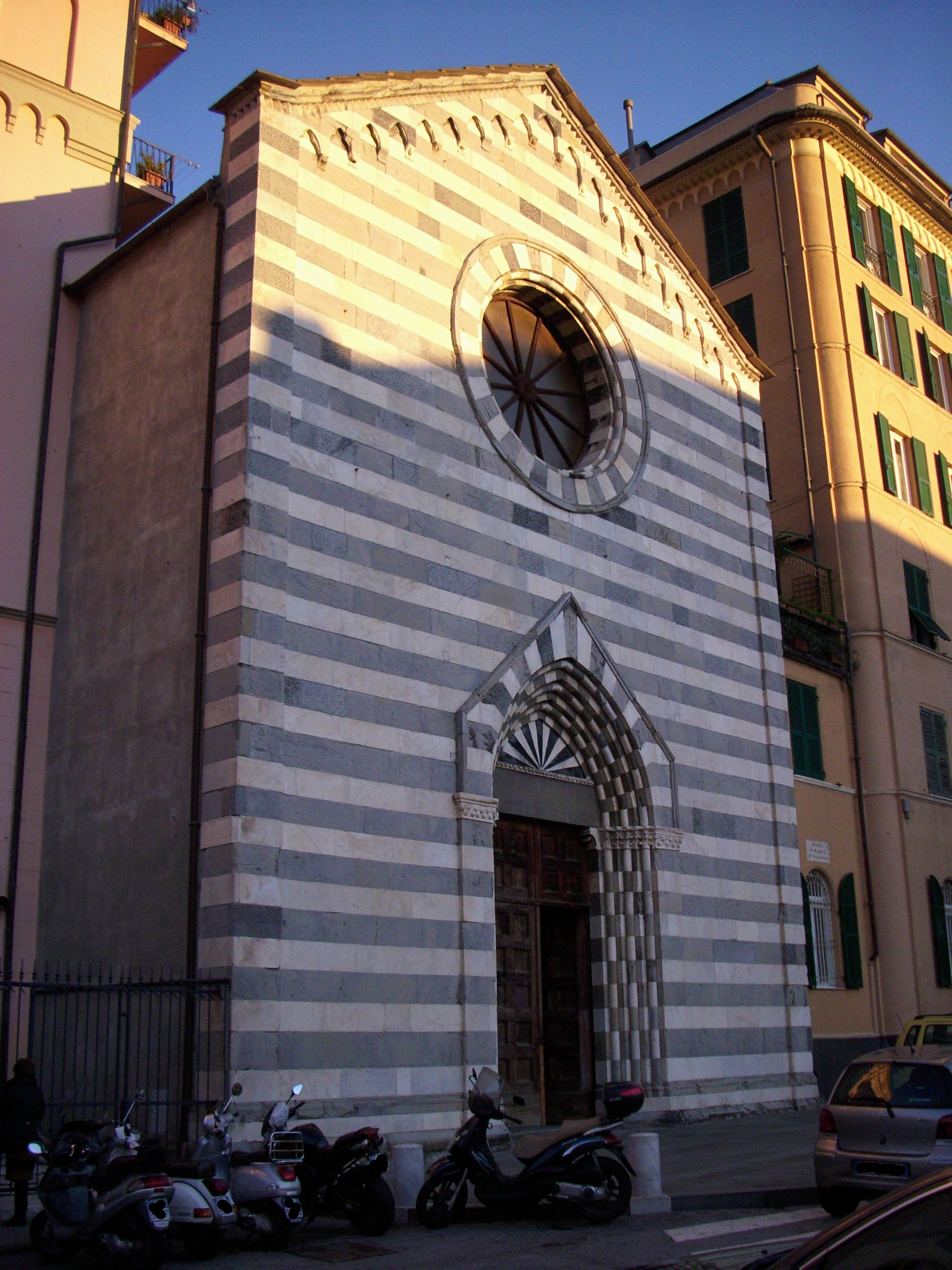
The facade of the church of Santa Maria via Lata

The church of Santa Maria in Via Lata, formerly the abbey of the Fieschi family, which was deconsecrated in the 19th century, was built in 1340 by the testamentary will of Cardinal Luca Fieschi and takes the name of the Roman basilica of the same name to which his cardinal's title was linked.

The Fieschi established a collegiate of twelve canons there, but in 1547, when due to Gianluigi Fieschi's failed conspiracy against Andrea Doria their properties on the hill of Carignano were expropriated and their palace destroyed, the church, while remaining the juspatronage of the Genoese family was downgraded to a simple abbey, a title that was extinguished only in 1858 with the death of the last abbot, Cardinal Adriano Fieschi.

In 1858 the deconsecrated church became the site of a furniture factory, and in 1911 it was purchased by the confraternity of St. Anthony Abbot. Severely damaged by bombs during World War II, it was rebuilt starting in 1949, but the work was not completed until the 1980s, although it was never reopened for worship and houses a restoration workshop.

Romanesque-Gothic in form, it has a black-and-white striped facade, typical of 14th-century Genoese architecture, made by alternating slabs of white marble and slate. The central rose window, destroyed by bombs, was rebuilt in 1953. The one-nave interior has an exposed wooden truss roof, rebuilt in 1950, while the square apse is surmounted by a rib vault. Some late 15th-century frescoes depicting the four evangelists are visible in the masonry vaults.

==== Church and Convent of the Mother of God ====
Located next to the Carignano Bridge, brushed by the automobile junction connecting the city center to the sea ring road, the Mother of God complex is one of the few surviving buildings of the ancient district. Founded in 1680 by the Clerics Regular of the Mother of God, it gave its name to the street of the same name, the central axis of the popular suburb. Renovated in the early 2000s, the complex has housed the Franzoniana Library since 2008.

The church was solemnly inaugurated in 1682 in the presence of Doge Luca Maria Invrea. In 1684 the convent was almost destroyed by French naval bombardment, while the church suffered severe damage and was restored in the following years through public subscriptions. The church was consecrated in 1732 by Bishop Antonio Maria Bacigalupi of Ventimiglia, who belonged to the congregation of the Mother of God.

The complex was closed at the end of the 18th century due to the laws of suppression of religious orders: the convent was converted into housing and the church became a workshop. In 1853 the church was purchased by the Waldensians, who wanted to make it their own place of worship, but the project was opposed by Archbishop Andrea Charvaz, as well as by many parish priests and citizens, and in 1855 the Waldensians, in order to avoid further controversy, sold it for 60,000 liras to the Franzonian Evangelical Workers, who reopened it for worship the following year. This event was the cause of a split in the Waldensian community of Genoa by some members, who were irritated by the weakness shown by the leaders of the Waldensian Table toward their Catholic counterparts.

During World War II the church, which had suffered some damage from bombings that heavily affected the district, became a shelter for the homeless. From 1946 used as a branch of the church of SS. Salvatore in Sarzano, which was half-destroyed by the bombing, it was closed for good in 1957. After years of neglect, between 1988 and 1993 it was occupied by a self-managed social center called “the Workshop.”

Having regained possession of the building, the Evangelical Workers began its restoration, to use it as the home of their library. The inauguration of the new building took place on December 10, 2008, in conjunction with the celebration of the third centenary of the founder's birth, although the last batch of work was not completed until 2010.

The church originally had six chapels, but only two were restored when the Franzonians took possession. Ratti, a few years before its closure, cited a statue of the Madonna with angels by Honoré Pellé on the high altar, frescoes attributed to Antonio Maria Haffner and Paolo Gerolamo Piola, and paintings by Mulinaretto (“Christ bleeding from the wounds”), Gregorio De Ferrari (“S. Filippo Neri”) and Domenico Fiasella (“S. Bernardo”) among the works of art preserved there.

=== Military architecture ===
==== Walls ====
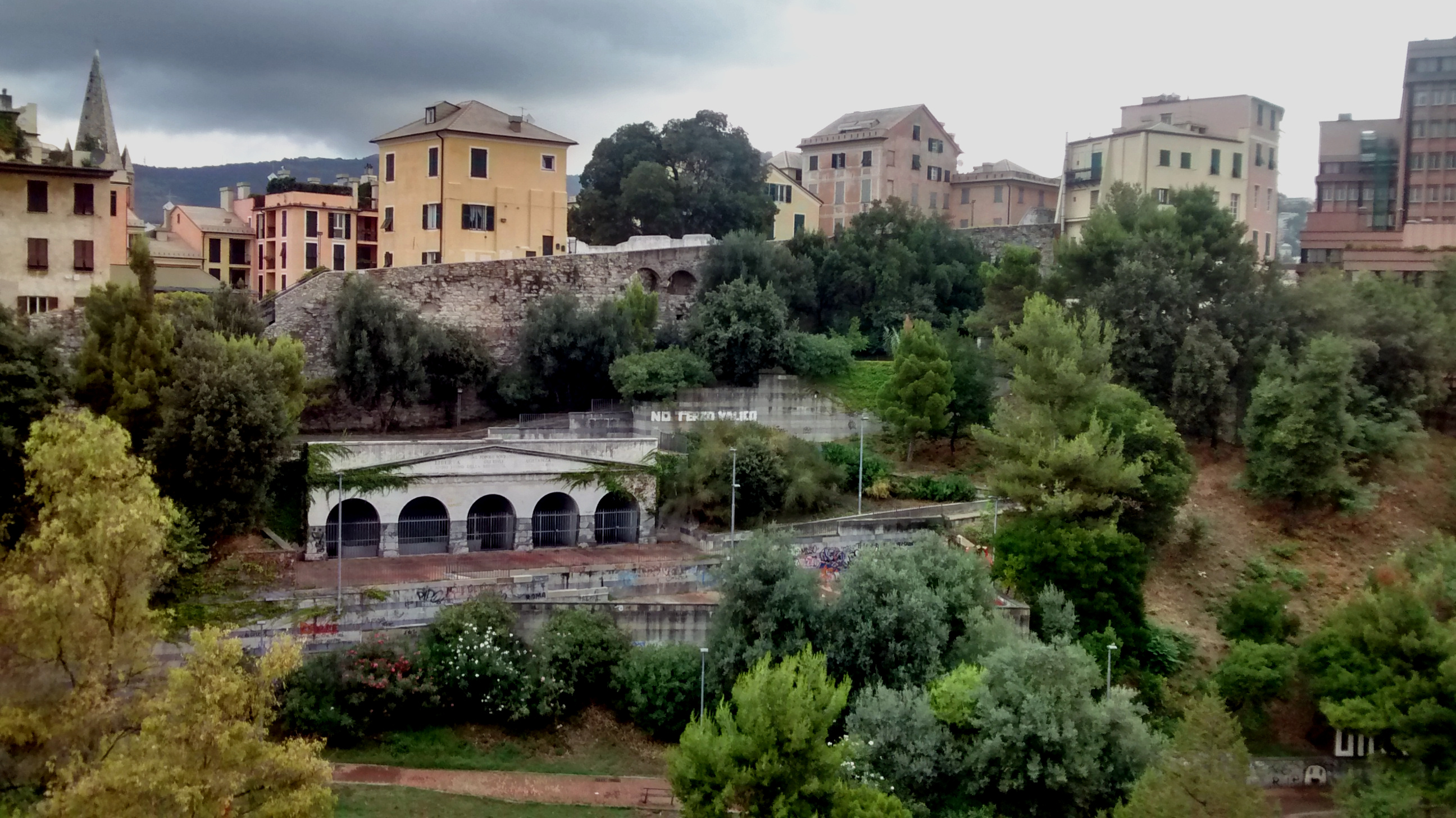
The remains of the walls of the Hill above the Barabino wash houses. Here stood until the 1970s the popular district of Via Madre di Dio

The district, as already mentioned, once outside the walls known as the Barbarossa walls (12th century), was later included within the 14th-century walls. What remains of the latter, later modified in the 16th century, bounds the neighborhood toward the east. A few sections remain of the older walls, between Porta Soprana and the Mura delle Grazie, at Via del Colle and at Via della Marina.

- Barbarossa Walls (12th century). The Barbarossa Walls, built in 1155, connected to the earlier Carolingian-era wall near the Soprana Gate and then went up Sarzano Hill. This section of wall, which after the cessation of its defensive function had been incorporated into civilian dwellings and its wall-walk (the so-called “Murette”) used to pass the city aqueduct through it, came to light after bombing in the area of Via del Colle. From the pass of the Murette, a small staircase provides access to the wall-walk, from where an overall view of the complex of buildings on Via Madre di Dio, with the Carignano Bridge and the Basilica of the Assumption, can be seen.
- Sixteenth-century walls. These walls were built between 1320 and 1327 and include the section from the Ponte Monumentale to the Grazie walls, encompassing the entire hill of Carignano; this section of wall, preserved only in part, was restructured, but keeping the same route, in the first half of the sixteenth century to adapt it to the new defense techniques, with the contribution of famous military architects of the time, such as Giovanni Maria Olgiati and Antonio da Sangallo. From the Porta degli Archi (or St. Stephen's) gate, which stood where the Monumental bridge is and with the 16th-century renovation replaced the older Porta dell'Olivella, the walls of St. Clare, along whose route runs Corso A. Podestà. This was followed by the Capuchin walls. Between the two stretches of walls, on an ancient service gate was rebuilt the Porta degli Archi. At the end of the Capuchin walls, at the southwest limit of the walled city cell, stood the Bastion of the Witch, where a cannon battery was later installed. From here the walls continued under various names (Strega's, St. James's, St. Margaret's, and Marina walls) on the sea cliffs to the Seno di Giano, connecting with the older city wall. The sea walls have for the most part disappeared with the urbanization of the area and the creation of the sea ring road: a few remnants can be seen on which stands the loggia of Villa Mylius. The Walls of St. Clare and the Capuchins were named after two convents that stood nearby. The one of St. Clare, dating from the mid-17th century, closed in 1797 by the Ligurian Republic, was demolished in the late 19th century after a brief reopening in the middle of the century; that of the Capuchins, on the other hand, was demolished in the 19th century for the construction of the Galliera Hospital.

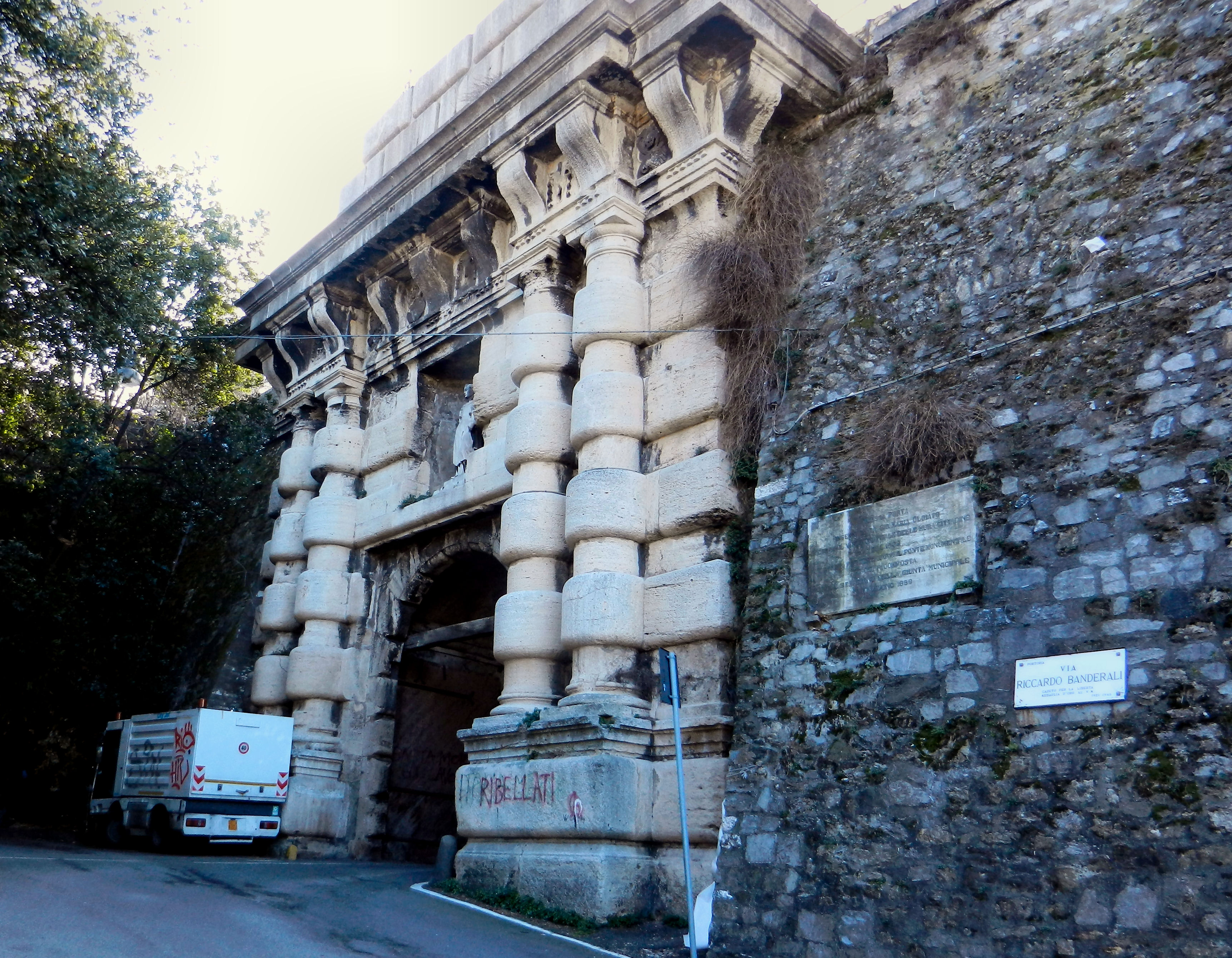
Porta degli Archi in its current location

- Porta degli Archi. Built in 1539 to a design by Olgiati, it was decorated on the outer side with Doric columns in travertine and surmounted by a statue of Saint Stephen, made by Taddeo Carlone. In 1896, following the construction of Via XX Settembre and the construction of the Monumental Bridge, it was dismantled and rebuilt at the Mura di S. Chiara, on Via R. Banderali. A plaque commemorates the relocation of the gate.

==== Andrea Doria Barracks (former convent of S. Leonardo) ====
Andrea Doria Barracks now occupies the former convent of S. Leonardo.

The convent, which gives its name to the slope of the same name, had been founded in 1317 by Leonardo Fieschi, bishop of Catania; it could accommodate forty nuns of the order of St. Clare, with the obligation to accommodate up to twelve girls of the Fieschi family who had chosen religious life; it was enriched over the centuries by valuable works of art (Domenico Piola, Lorenzo De Ferrari, Borzone and Sarzana painted frescoes and panels there).

Closed by the democratic government in 1798, it was turned into barracks by the Savoy government, which made it the seat of the garrison to defend the city, coming to house up to 1,200 military personnel in the 19th century. It is home to the "Technical Unit" of the "1st Infrastructure Department" of the Italian Army.

==== Coastal batteries ====
The sea front of Carignano hill was defended by some of the oldest coastal batteries defending the harbor, named Cava, Stella and Strega. Cava and Strega were also, in the early twentieth century, the names of two popular seaside resorts located on the small beaches at the base of the cliffs below the batteries, in use until the 1950s, when the seabed was buried to build the fairgrounds. The “Cava” beach is one of the places in Genoa nostalgically evoked by a Genoese man who emigrated to South America in the popular song “Ma se ghe penso.”

Along the cliffs below the batteries, at the edge of the little beaches, in 1914, on the occasion of the International Hygiene, Marine and Colonial Exposition, a monorail, called Telfer, was built for the first time in Italy, connecting Piazza di Francia (later Piazza della Vittoria) to Molo Giano, inside the port. Frequently used during the Exposition, it was then used for freight transportation for a few years and finally dismantled in 1918.

- Quarry Battery. Originally armed with five cannons to defend the harbor, it was modernized and upgraded in 1878, when the equipment was increased to eight 24 GRC Ret cannons. It was located immediately west of the Corsica Street traffic circle. Disarmed in 1914, it was dismantled in 1930. The old structures have completely disappeared, and the area is occupied by commercial activities. It was named after the nearby Bastion of the Quarry, whose toponym referred to a stone quarry exploited from the early 16th century to 1630 for the construction of the Pier, later used as a place of execution of death sentences and in the 19th century also as a cemetery for the victims of the cholera epidemics of 1821 and 1835.
- Stella Battery. It was built in 1846 on an earlier battery “at the water's edge.” Located on the cliffs below the Poggio della Giovine Italia, it was disarmed and converted into a lighthouse in 1883. This fortification, which originally faced directly onto the sea, is located under the wall of Corso Aurelio Saffi; after World War II an office building was built on the structure of the old battery, which is still clearly visible from Via dei Pescatori, and is the Genoese headquarters of the Navy's Technical Office.
- Witch Battery. It was located in the area between Corso Aurelio Saffi and Via Vannucci and was one of the oldest defensive posts: chronicles report that in 1684 it went into action against French ships; it was modernized in 1878. It comprised two separate sections, the “Lower Battery,” armed with five 32 GRC Ret guns, and the “Upper Battery,” armed with six 24 GRC Ret howitzers. Disarmed in 1915, it was completely demolished around 1926 with the construction of the buildings on Via Vannucci.

== Infrastructure and transportation ==
=== Highways ===
The nearest highway tollbooths are the Genoa-East tollbooth on the A12 freeway and the Genoa-West tollbooth, where the four freeways under Genoa converge: the A7 (Genoa - Milan), A26 (Genoa - Gravellona Toce), A10 (Genoa - Ventimiglia) and A12 (Genoa - Rosignano), both about 5 km from the center of the district.

=== Railways ===
Genova Brignole railway station is located about 2 km. from Piazza Carignano.

=== Urban transportation ===
- Subway. The nearest subway station is Sarzano/Sant'Agostino, a few hundred meters from Piazza Carignano.
- Bus. The district is served by the AMT's urban bus routes 13, 14 and 35: the first two run along the ring road to the sea, connecting Piazza Caricamento with the neighborhoods of Val Bisagno, passing near Brignole train station; the third crosses the entire district, connecting it with Piazza De Ferrari, Genova Piazza Principe Railway Station and the Lagaccio district, where there are two separate terminuses.

=== Airports ===
Genoa Cristoforo Colombo Airport is the nearest airport.

== See also ==
- Santa Maria Assunta, Genoa

== Bibliography ==
- Guida d'Italia - Liguria. Milano: TCI. 2009.
- Poleggi, Ennio (1981). Le città nella storia d'Italia [Cities in the history of Italy] (in Italian). Roma-Bari: Editore Laterza.
- Poleggi, Ennio (1989). Città portuali del Mediterraneo, storia e archeologia. Atti del Convegno Internazionale di Genova 1985 [Mediterranean port cities, history and archaeology. Proceedings of the International Conference of Genoa 1985.] (in Italian). Genova: SAGEP Editrice. ISBN 88-7058-303-1.
- Caraceni Poleggi, Fiorella (1984). Genova - Guida Sagep [Genoa - Sagep Guide] (in Italian). SAGEP Editrice - Automobile Club di Genova.
- Casalis, Goffredo (1840). Dizionario geografico, storico, statistico e commerciale degli stati di S.M. il Re di Sardegna [Geographical, historical, statistical and commercial dictionary of the states of HM the King of Sardinia] (in Italian). Torino: G. Maspero.
- Finauri, Stefano (2007). Forti di Genova: storia, tecnica e architettura dei fortini difensivi [Forts of Genoa: history, technique and architecture of defensive forts] (in Italian). Genova: Edizioni Servizi Editoriali. ISBN 978-88-89384-27-5.
