= Bassignani =

Bassignani is a surname. Notable people with the surname include:

- Giovanni Bassignani (1669–1717), Italian architect and engineer
- Umberto Bassignani (1878–1944), Italian sculptor
- Phillip Bassignani (born 1984), Rural Alaskan Aviator and mechanic
