= Giovanni Bassignani =

Italian architect and engineer

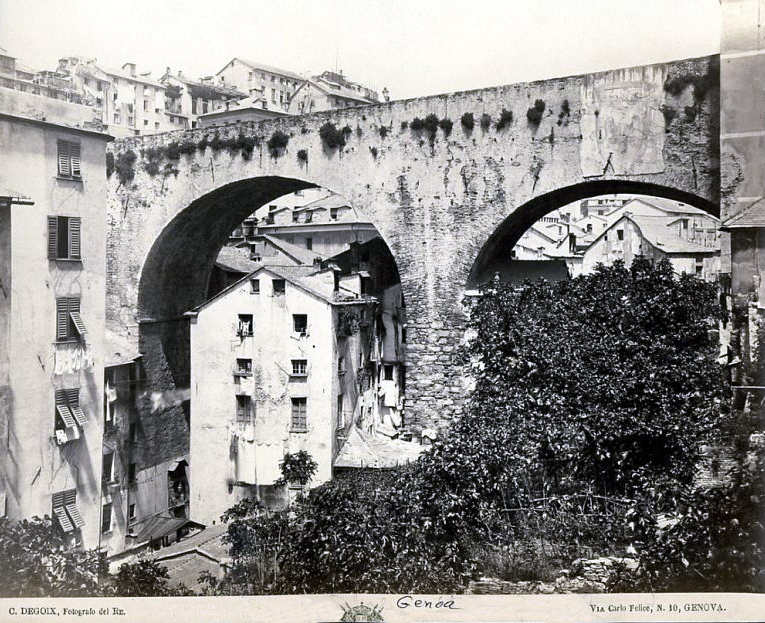
Bridge of Carignano in Genoa

Giovanni Bassignani (1669 – May 1717) was an Italian architect and engineer of the late-Baroque.

Born in Brescia, to Tuscan parents, he studied in Padua then traveled to Venice, Modena, and Genoa. He aided the Venetian Republic in a number of military projects, including rebuilding forts for the defense of Morea, in their wars against the Ottomans. He was wounded in the battles for Negroponte.
