= Sarzano/Sant'Agostino (Genoa Metro) =

Genoa Metro station

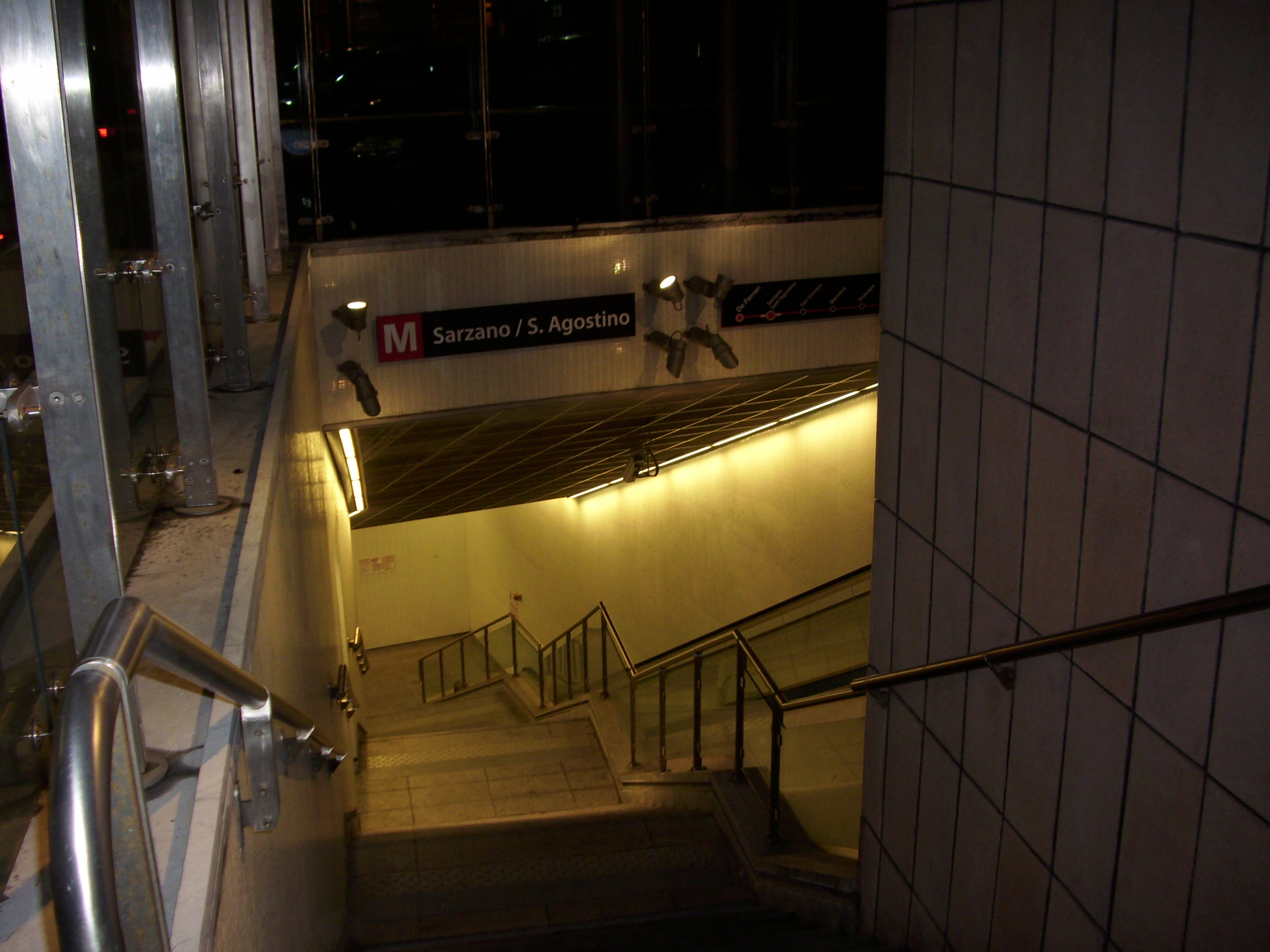

General information
- Location: Piazza di Sarzano, Genoa; Italy
- Coordinates: 44°24′15″N 8°55′54″E
- Owner: AMT Genoa
- Tracks: 2

Construction
- Structure type: Underground
- Accessible: Yes

History
- Opened: 3 April 2006

Services
Preceding station	Genoa Metro	Following station
San Giorgio towards Brin	Genoa Metro	De Ferrari towards Brignole
Location

Sarzano/Sant'Agostino is a Genoa Metro station, located in the historical centre of Genoa, Italy. The main entrance is in the Piazza di Sarzano near the Church of St. Augustine, now deconsecrated and turned into a museum, with a second entrance on the Mura della Marina, the old seawall. It is the newest station, having opened on 3 April 2006, about a year after the easterly terminus at De Ferrari.
