= San Giorgio (Genoa Metro) =

Genoa Metro station

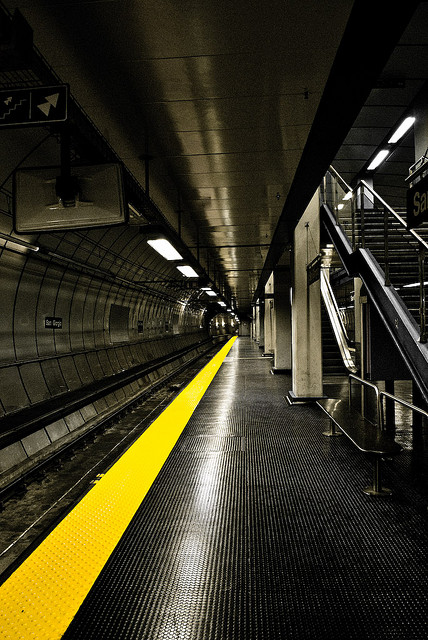

General information
- Location: Piazza della Raibetta, Genoa; Italy
- Coordinates: 44°24′31″N 8°55′43″E
- Owner: AMT Genoa
- Platforms: Island platform
- Tracks: 2

Construction
- Structure type: Underground
- Accessible: Yes

History
- Opened: 25 July 2003

Services
Preceding station	Genoa Metro	Following station
Darsena towards Brin	Genoa Metro	Sarzano/Sant'Agostino towards Brignole
Location

San Giorgio is a Genoa Metro station in Genoa, Italy. It is located under Piazza della Raibetta beside the Palazzo San Giorgio, after which it is named. It is in the Old Harbour area near the Aquarium of Genoa.

The station was designed by architects Renzo Piano BWS ndm.

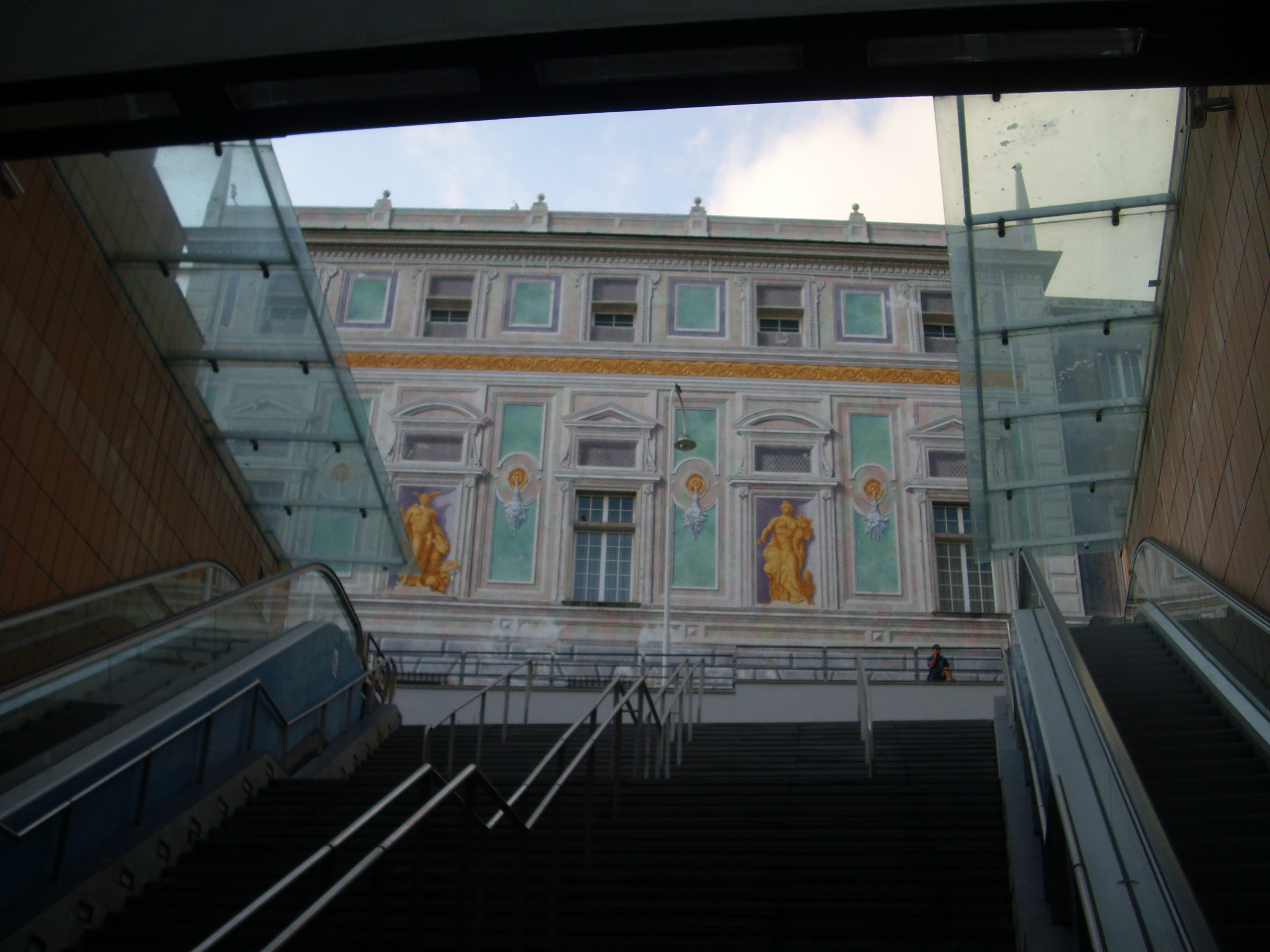
Exiting the station to Palazzo San Giorgio
