= Principe (Genoa Metro) =

Genoa Metro station

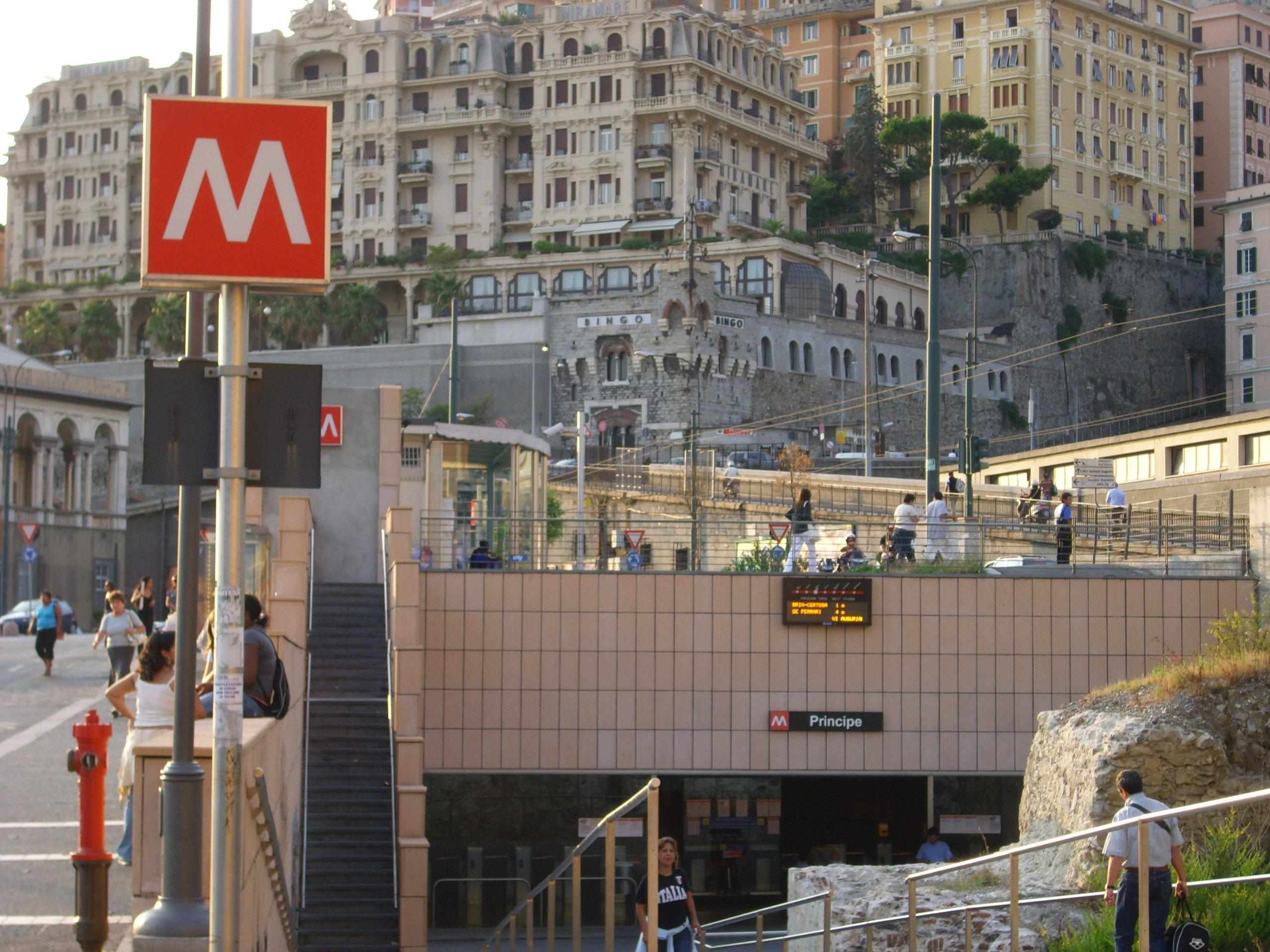

General information
- Location: Piazza del Principe, Genoa; Italy
- Coordinates: 44°24′59″N 8°55′09″E
- Owner: AMT Genoa
- Tracks: 2
- Connections: Piazza Principe railway station

Construction
- Structure type: Underground
- Accessible: Yes

History
- Opened: 1992

Services
Preceding station	Genoa Metro	Following station
Dinegro towards Brin	Genoa Metro	Darsena towards Brignole
Location

Principe is a Genoa Metro station, in Genoa, Italy.

It is planned to construct an underpass to connect directly to the nearby Genova Piazza Principe railway station.
