= Rosazza (disambiguation) =

Rosazza is a comune in the Province of Biella, Piedmont, Italy.

It may also refer to:

- Joan Rosazza (born 1937), American swimmer
- Peter A. Rosazza (born 1935), American prelate of the Roman Catholic Church
- Villa Di Negro Rosazza dello Scoglietto, a villa located in the quarter of San Teodoro in Genoa, Italy
