= Dinegro (Genoa Metro) =

Genoa Metro station

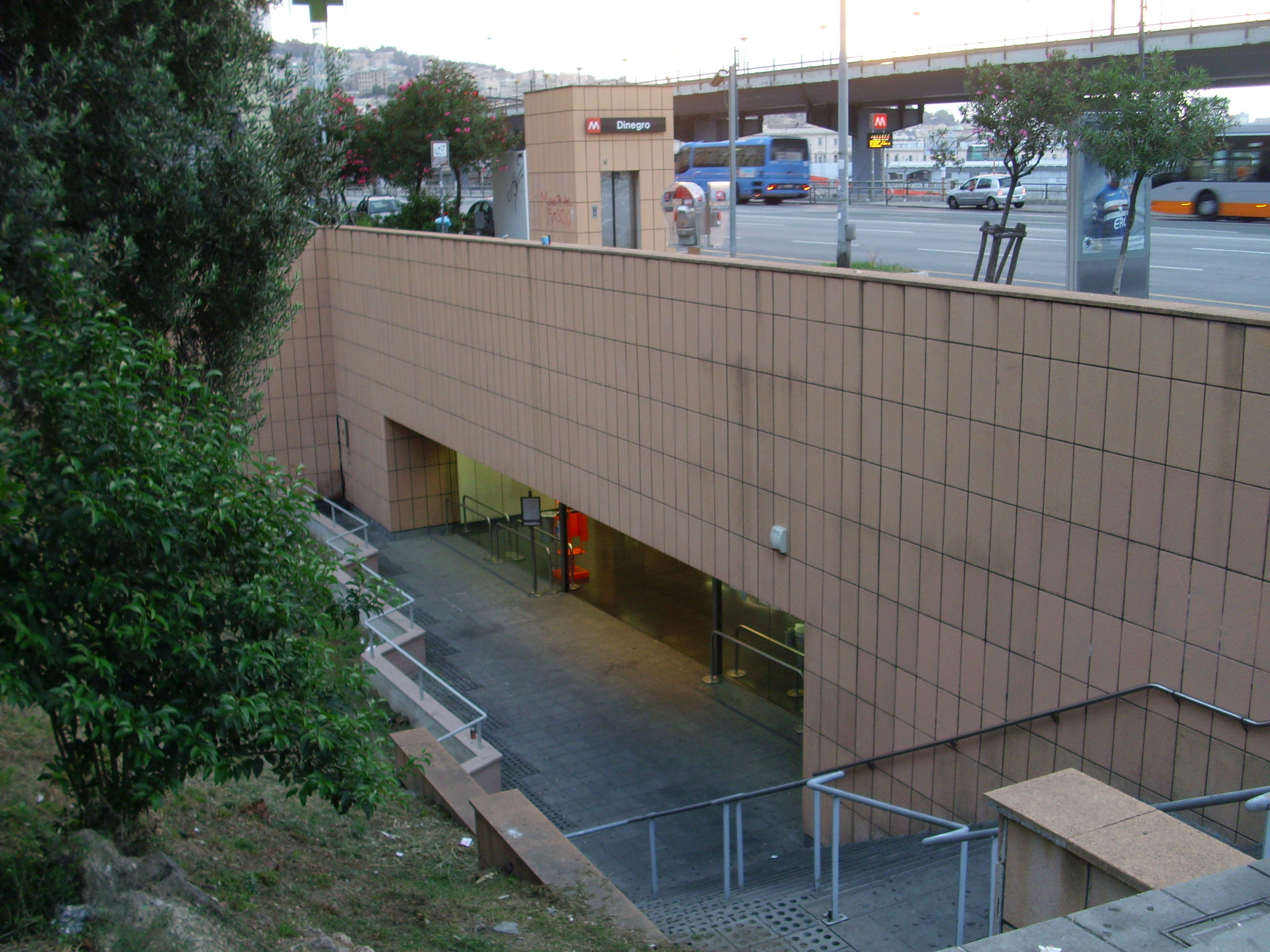

General information
- Location: Via Milano, Genoa; Italy
- Coordinates: 44°24′50″N 8°54′43″E
- Owner: AMT Genoa
- Tracks: 2

Construction
- Structure type: Underground
- Accessible: Yes

History
- Opened: 13 June 1990

Services
Preceding station	Genoa Metro	Following station
Brin Terminus	Genoa Metro	Principe towards Brignole
Location

Dinegro is a Genoa Metro station. It is located under Via Milano, adjoining the Piazza Dinegro from which it derives its name, in the Fassolo area of Genoa, Italy. The station is placed just east of the business district of San Benigno and close to the ferry terminal. There are bus stops on the street outside the station, with numerous bus and trolleybus services.

The station, which opened on 13 June 1990, was designed by Renzo Piano and at a depth of approximately 5 metres below ground level can be reached by a single flight of stairs.

The station is located in the proximity of Villa Di Negro Rosazza dello Scoglietto, a 16th-century villa built for the Di Negro family, a distinguished aristocratic family of the Republic of Genoa, after which the area is named.
