= De Ferrari (Genoa Metro) =

Genoa Metro station

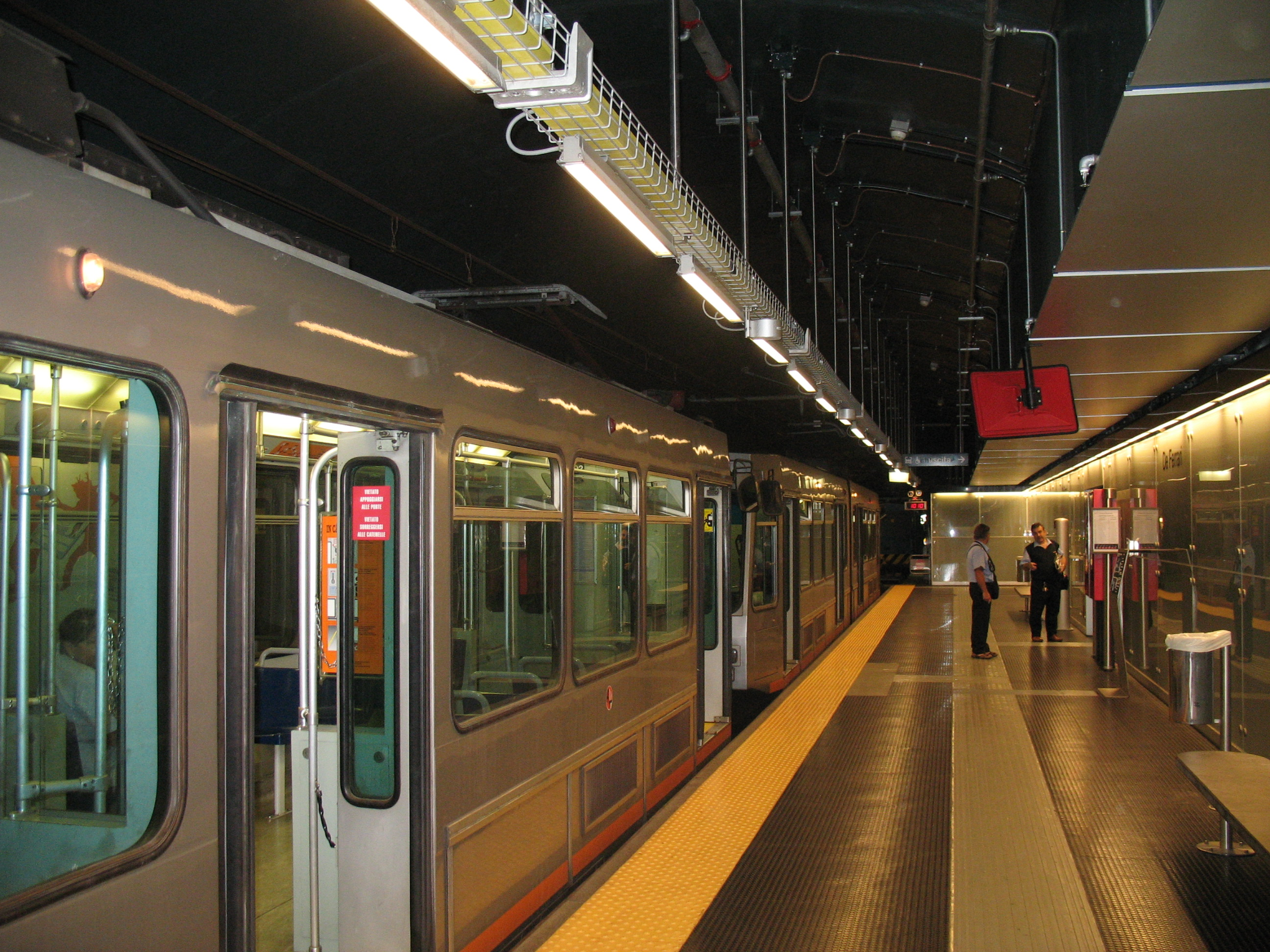

General information
- Location: Piazza De Ferrari, Genoa; Italy
- Coordinates: 44°24′27.5″N 8°56′04″E
- Owner: AMT Genoa
- Tracks: 2

Construction
- Structure type: Underground
- Accessible: Yes

History
- Opened: 4 February 2005

Services
Preceding station	Genoa Metro	Following station
Sarzano/Sant'Agostino towards Brin	Genoa Metro	Brignole Terminus
Location

De Ferrari is a Genoa Metro station, located in Piazza De Ferrari in the centre of Genoa, Italy. The station is close to Teatro Carlo Felice, Galleria Mazzini, the Doge's Palace, and Via XX Settembre.

The station opened on 4 February 2005. It was originally designed, like others, by Renzo Piano with finishing touches by Renzo Truffelli. This used to be the last station on the line until the easterly extension towards Genova Brignole railway station opened in 2012.
