= Villa Di Negro Rosazza dello Scoglietto =

Villa Di Negro Rosazza "dello Scoglietto"
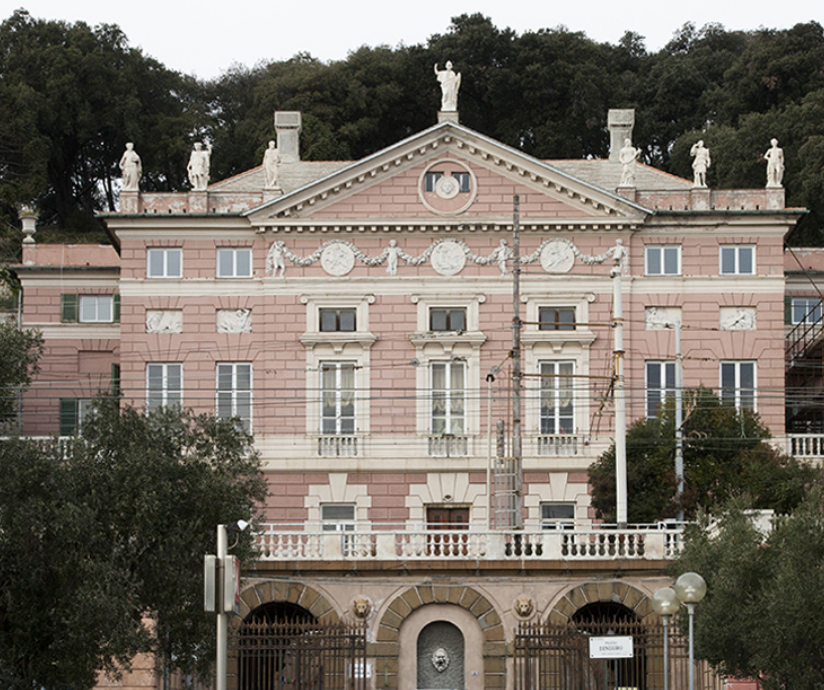
- Villa Di Negro Rosazza "dello Scoglietto", southern facade
- Interactive map of the Villa Di Negro Rosazza "dello Scoglietto" area

General information
- Status: In use
- Type: Villa
- Architectural style: Neoclassical
- Location: Piazza Dinegro, 3, Genoa, Italy
- Coordinates: 44.4139879°N 8.9113984°E
- Construction started: 1565
- Renovated: 1787
- Client: Ambrogio Di Negro (16th century); Gian Luca Durazzo (18th century)
- Owner: Municipality of Genoa

Design and construction
- Architect: Emanuele Andrea Tagliafichi

Villa Di Negro Rosazza "dello Scoglietto" or "lo Scoglietto" is a villa located in the quarter of San Teodoro in Genoa, Northwestern Italy. It was built in 1565 for the Doge Ambrogio Di Negro o for his son Orazio, in a coastal area that used to be outside of the city walls. The villa passed to the Durazzo family, who commissioned a renovation in the neoclassical style at the end of the 18th century. In the 19th century, the construction of the railway Turin-Genoa led to the destruction of the garden at the sea side, while the hill side remained largely untouched. The villa and the park are now owned by the Municipality of Genoa and destined to public use. The villa is located near the Dinegro station of the Metro of Genoa.

== History ==
The villa was commissioned in the 16th century by Doge Ambrogio Di Negro or his son Orazio in an area known as "Fassolo" - at the time outside of the city walls - where the Di Negro family owned a villa already since the beginning of the 15th century. Passed first to the Maniero family, then to the Durazzo family, the villa was completely remodeled in 1787 by the genoese architect Emanuele Andrea Tagliafichi for Gian Luca Durazzo, when it received the current neoclassical appearance.

In the 19th century the villa hosted famous guests, including Caroline of Brunswick, wife of George IV of the United Kingdom (1815), Pope Pius VII (1836), Honoré de Balzac and Lorenzo Pareto. Passed to the Rolla Rosazza family, it was later acquired by the Municipality of Genoa.

The original setting has radically changed as a result of the urbanization of the area and, in particular, of the construction of the Turin-Genoa railway in the 19th century, which led to the loss of the garden at the sea side. The garden at the hill side was renovated in 2015 and is now a public park.

== Description ==
=== Architecture ===
The original appearance of the 16th-century villa, testified by an 18th-century engraving, featured a facade with loggias, architectural structures and large statues attributed to Giovanni Andrea Ansaldo. After the 18th century remodeling, the facade presents neoclassical structures with sculptures by Nicolò Stefano Traverso. Internally, the irregular layout shows an atypical distribution of the spaces.

=== Decoration ===
The internal decoration preserves original 16th century elements, such as the portals, the frescoes in the piano nobile showing the achievements of Doge Ambrogio Di Negro against the Corsicans, and the grotesque paintings in the other rooms. Some 18th century elements are also visible, such as stucco decorations.

=== Garden ===
The park of the villa, designed by the architect Tagliafichi in the 18th century, extended from the sea to the hill. While the front part is now lost, a monumental nymphaeum remains at the level of the main building, as well as the part at the back of the villa. The original distribution is documented by Martin-Pierre Gauthier.

== See also ==
- Genoa
- Dinegro (Genoa Metro)
- Durazzo (family)
- Martin-Pierre Gauthier
- Villas of Genoa

== Bibliography ==
- Lauro Magnani (1978). Villa Rosazza (lo Scoglietto), Guide di Genova n. 69. Genova: Sagep Editrice.
- Catalogo delle Ville Genovesi, Italia Nostra, Genova 1967, p. 64-71.
- Guida d'Italia Liguria, Touring Club Italiano, 2009, p. 173.
- Le Ville del Genovesato, SAGEP, 2008.
- Federico Alizeri, Guida artistica per la città di Genova, Genova 1846.
- Martin-Pierre Gauthier, Les plus beaux edifices de la ville de Genes, Paris, 1832,

== Gallery ==
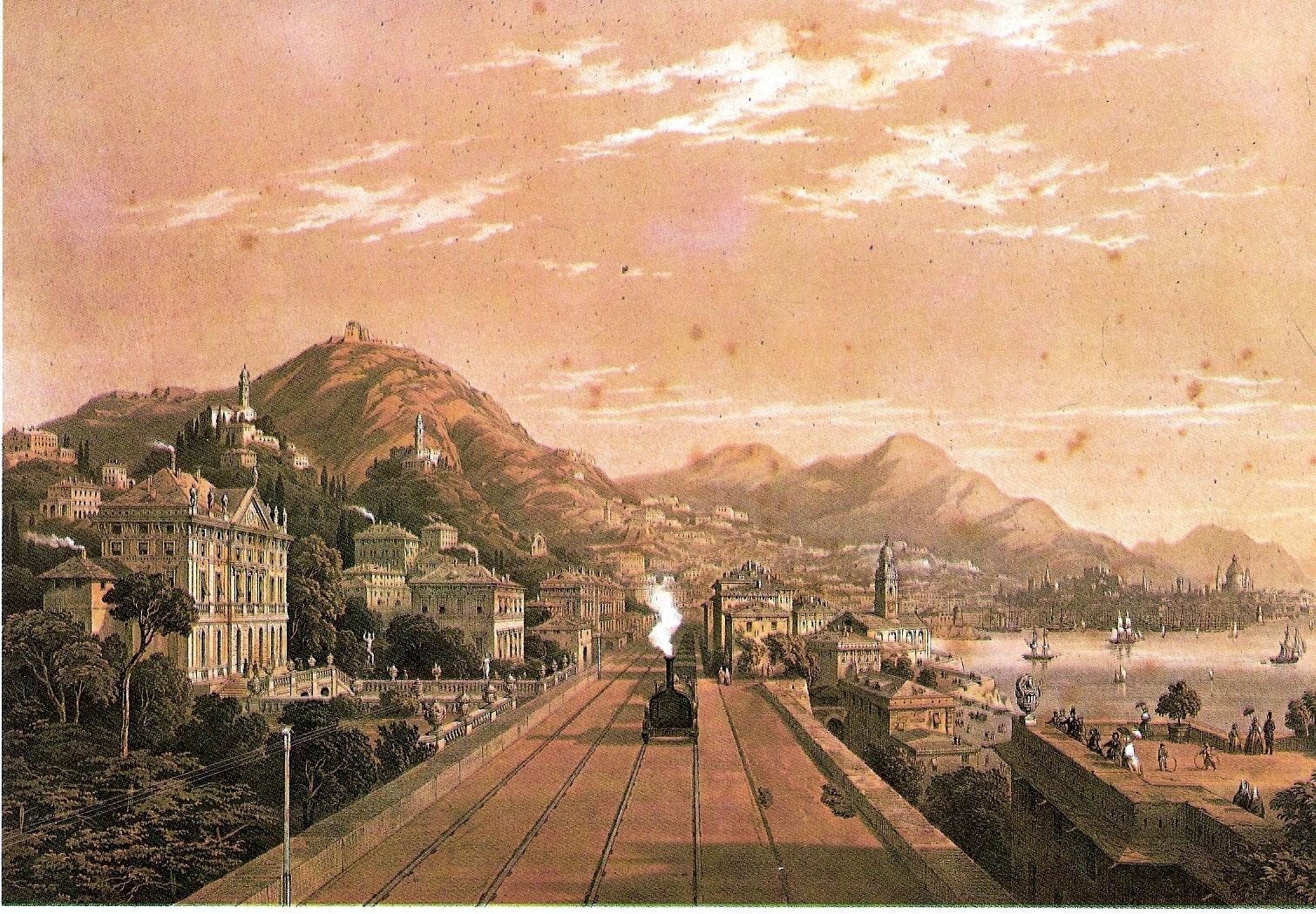
La Ferrovia Torino-Genova e Villa Di Negro Rosazza (a sin.)

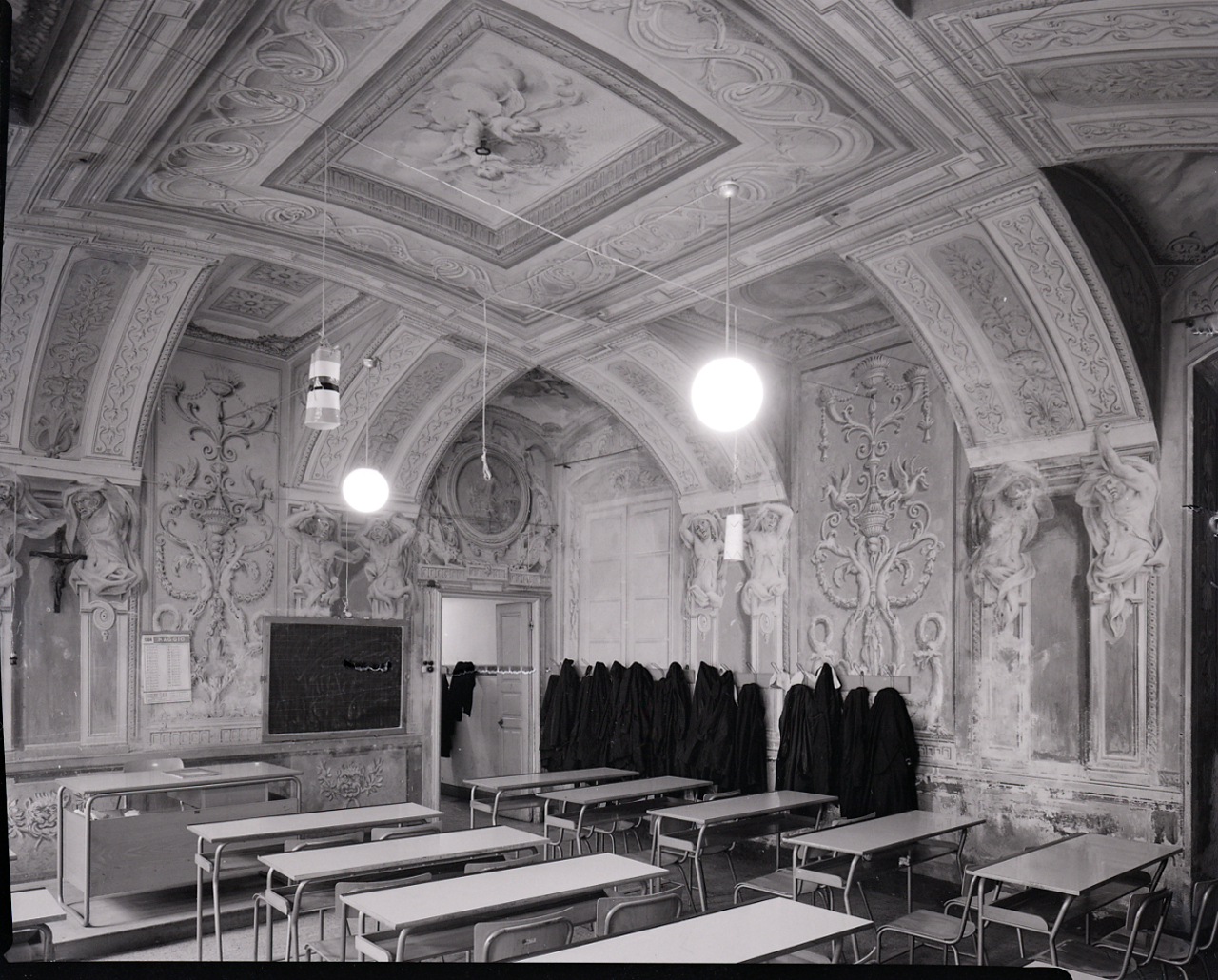
Villa Di Negro Rosazza. Paolo Monti - Servizio fotografico (Genova, 1964)

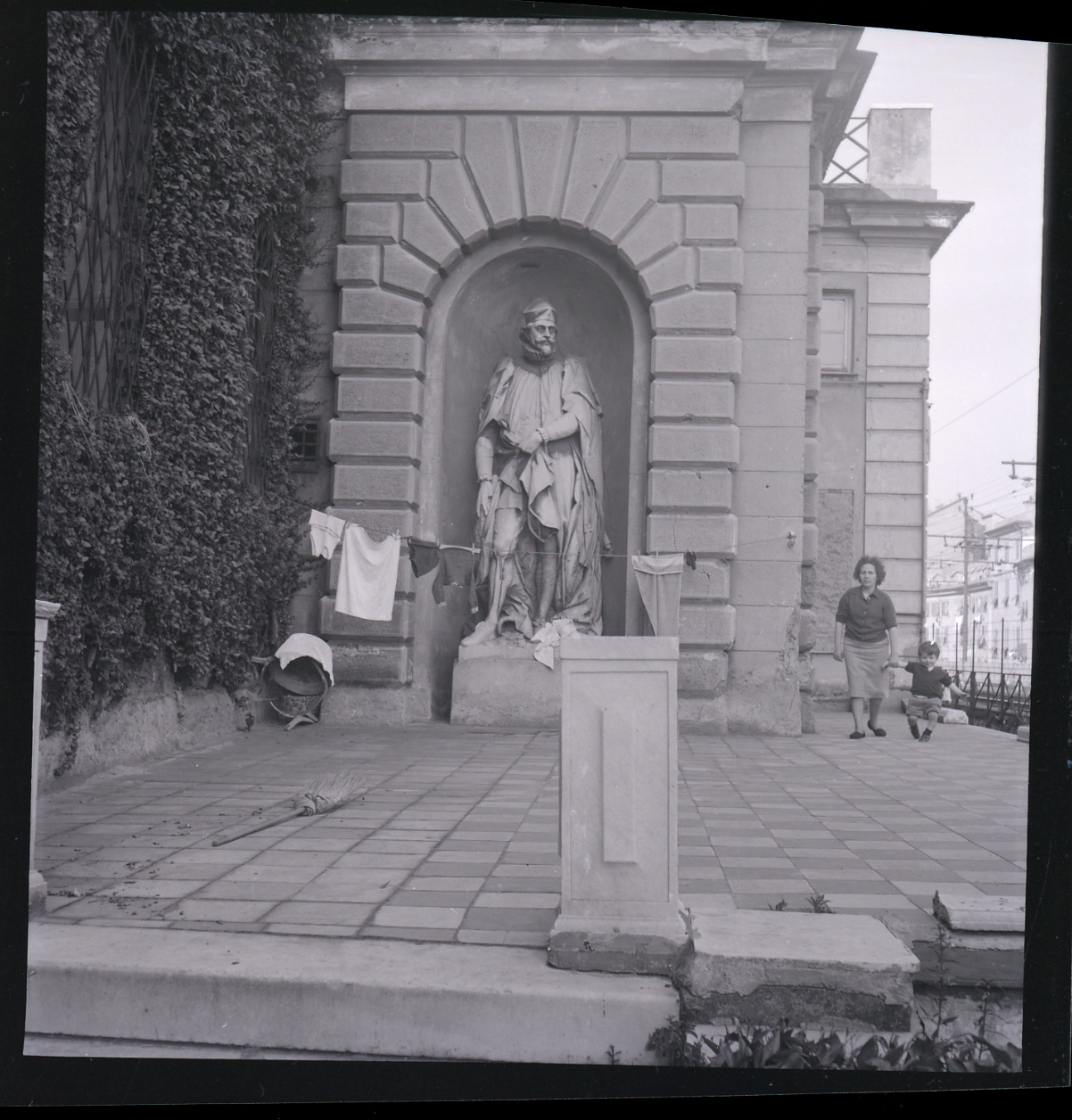
Villa Di Negro Rosazza. Paolo Monti - Servizio fotografico (Genova, 1964)

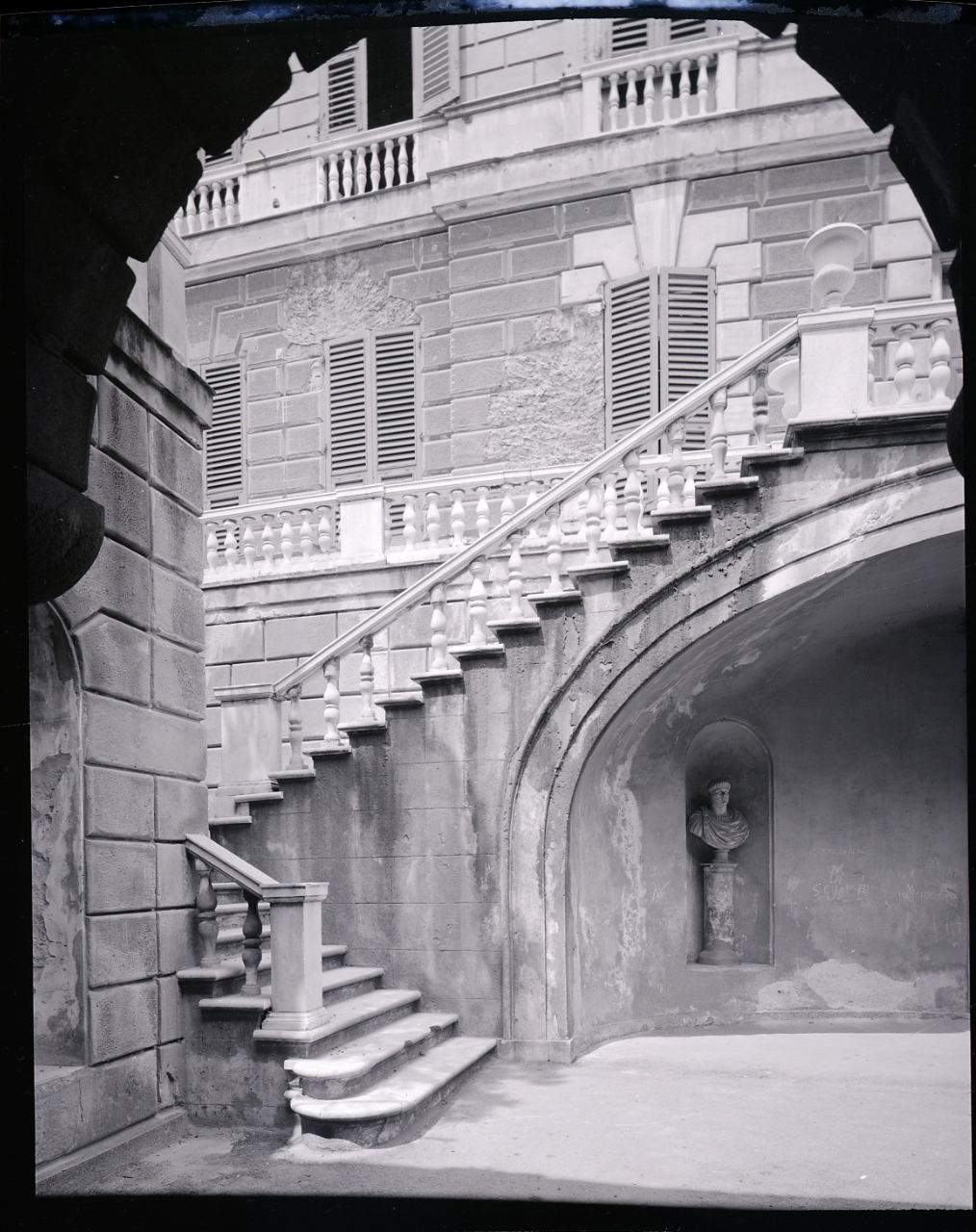
Villa Di Negro Rosazza. Paolo Monti - Servizio fotografico (Genova, 1964)

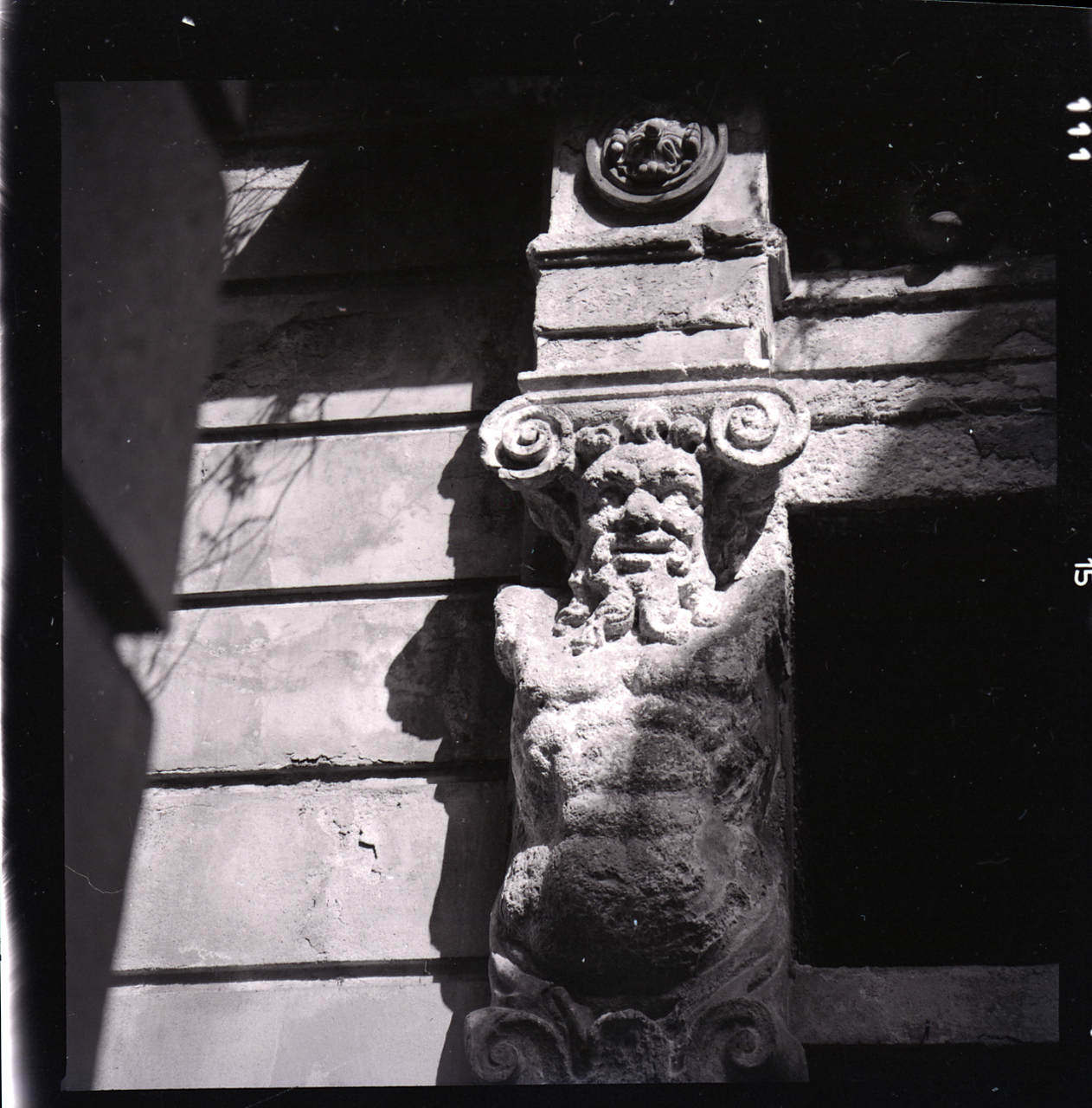
Villa Di Negro Rosazza. Paolo Monti - Servizio fotografico (Genova, 1964)

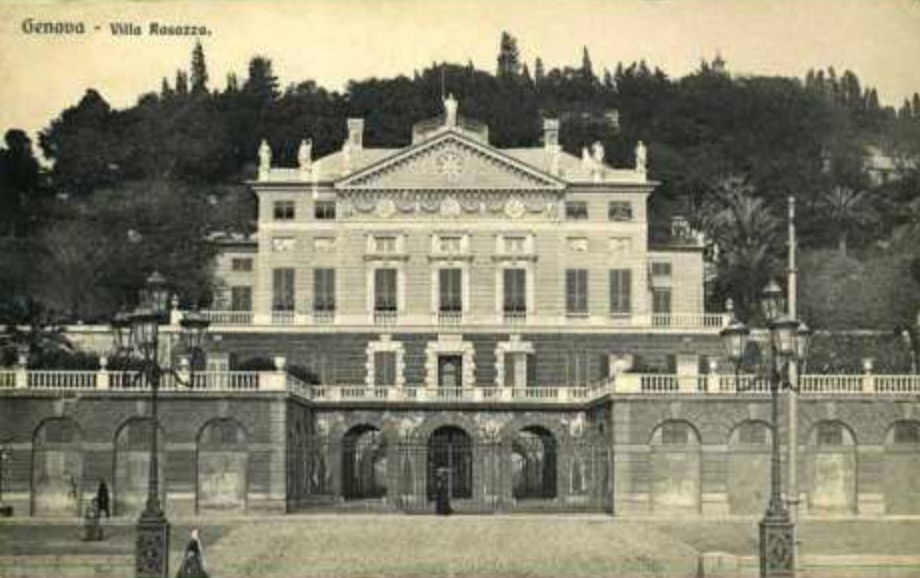
Villa Di Negro Rosazza

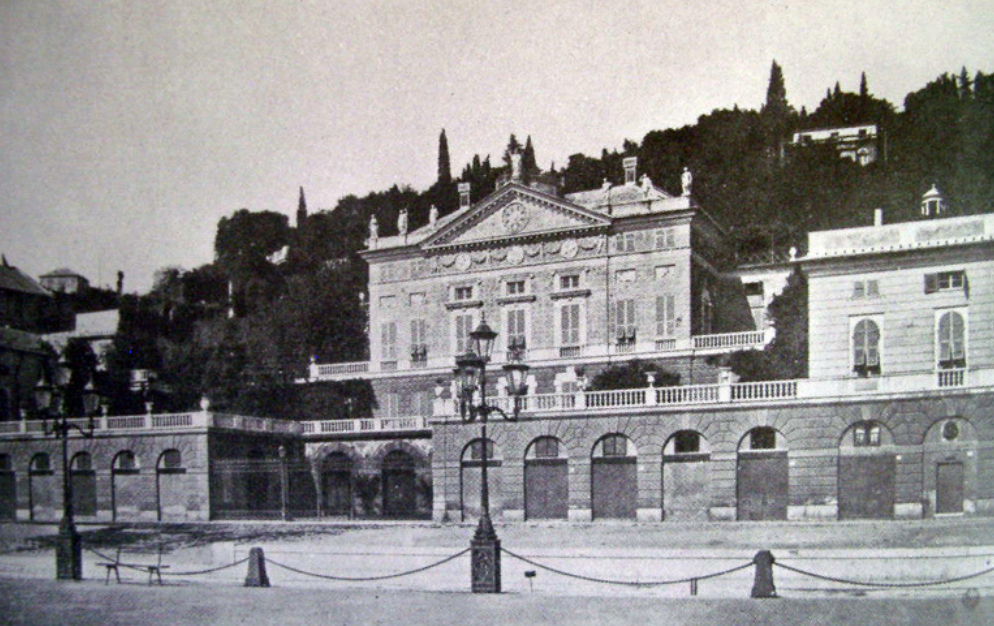
Villa Di Negro Rosazza

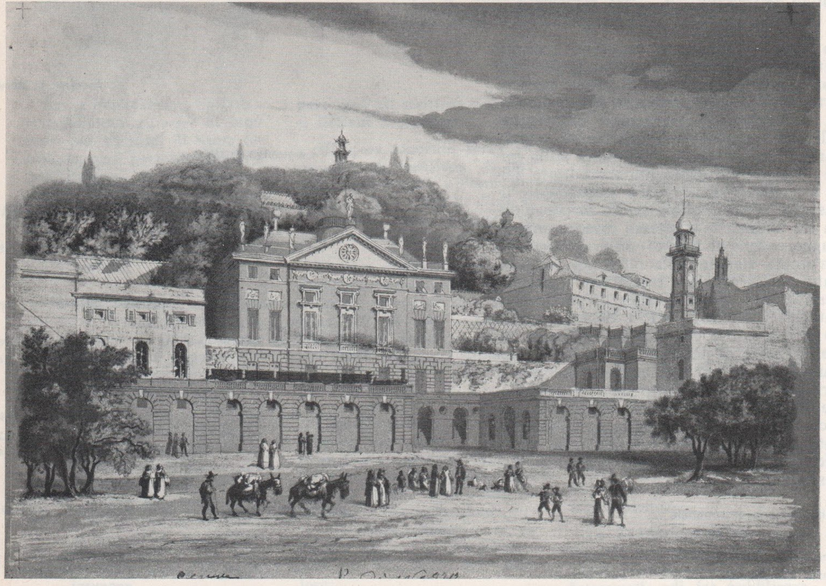
Villa Di Negro Rosazza

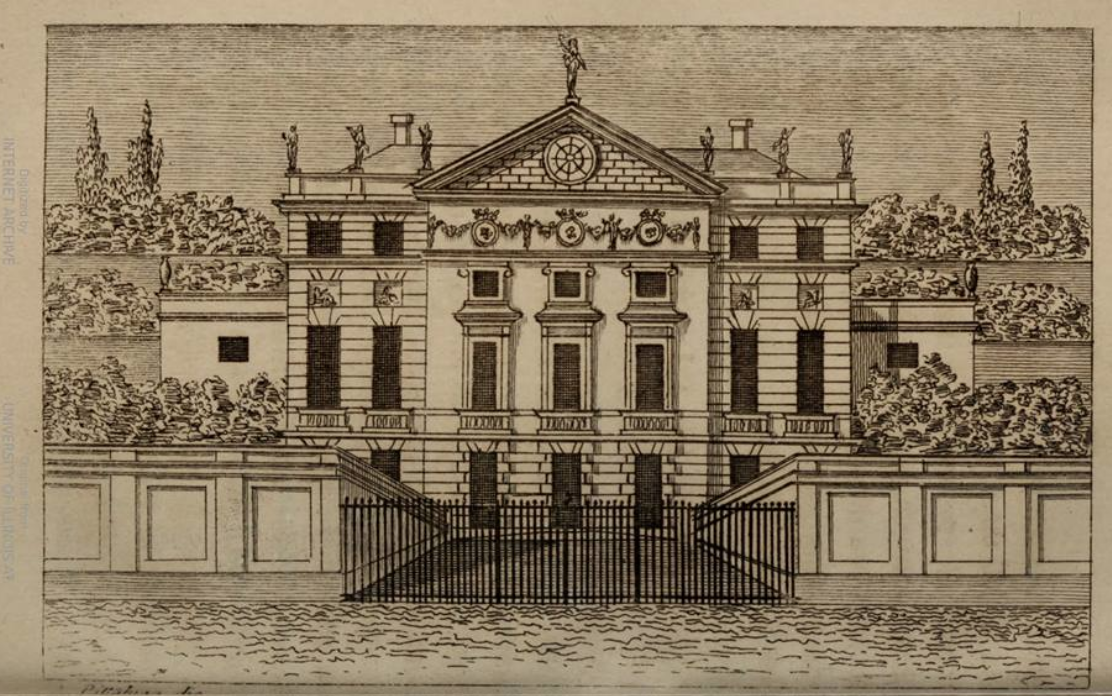
Villa Di Negro Rosazza
