= Piazza De Ferrari =

Square in Genoa, Italy

Coordinates: 44°24′25.57″N 8°56′3.23″E

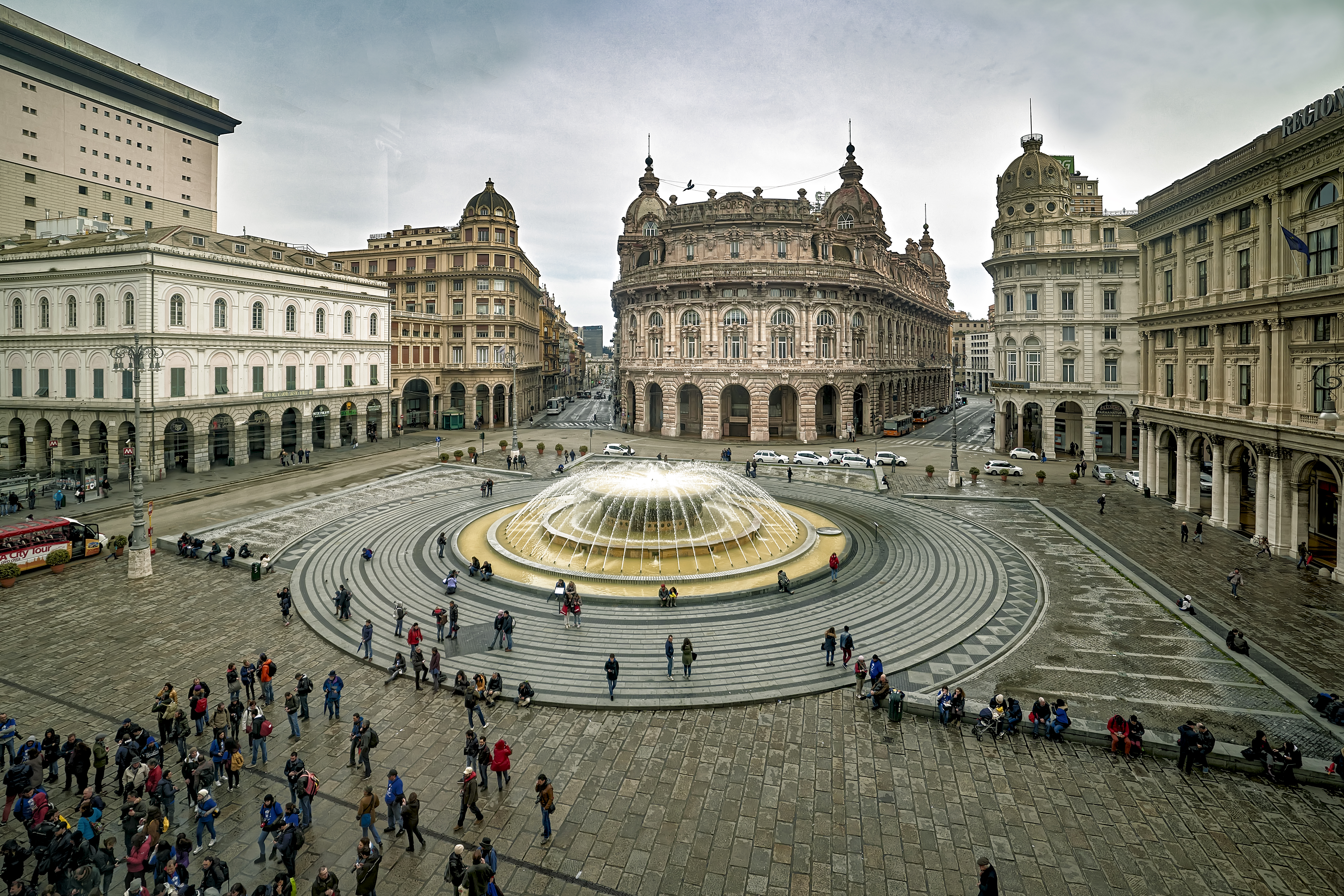
View of the east side of Piazza De Ferrari, towards Via XX Settembre and Via Dante

Piazza De Ferrari is the main square of Genoa. Situated in the heart of the city between the historical and the modern center, Piazza De Ferrari is renowned for its fountain, which was restored in recent years along with a major restyling of the square.

Today next to Piazza De Ferrari are numerous office buildings, headquarters of banks, insurances and other private companies, making of this district the financial and business centre of Genoa, so that the Genoese popularly refer to it as the "City" of Genoa. At the end of the 19th century Genoa was the main financial centre of Italy along with Milan, and Piazza De Ferrari was the place where many institutions were established, like the stock exchange, the Credito Italiano, the branch offices of the Bank of Italy, founded in 1893.

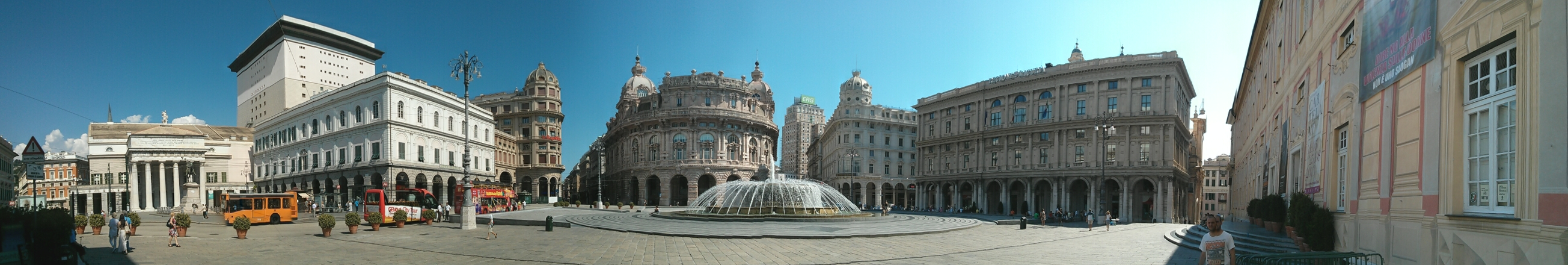

== Description ==
The square, dedicated to the Italian banker and politician Raffaele De Ferrari, duke of Galliera, has an irregular form due to urbanistic works which united two different urban areas. The square is about 11,000 m^{2} (120,000 ft^{2}).

Today's shape of the piazza took form in the first two decades of the twentieth century with the creation of the three streets which converge from east: Via XX Settembre, Via Dante and Via Petrarca; and with the creation of the four eclectic palaces. All of this was built on the area obtained through the excavation of Colle San Andrea.

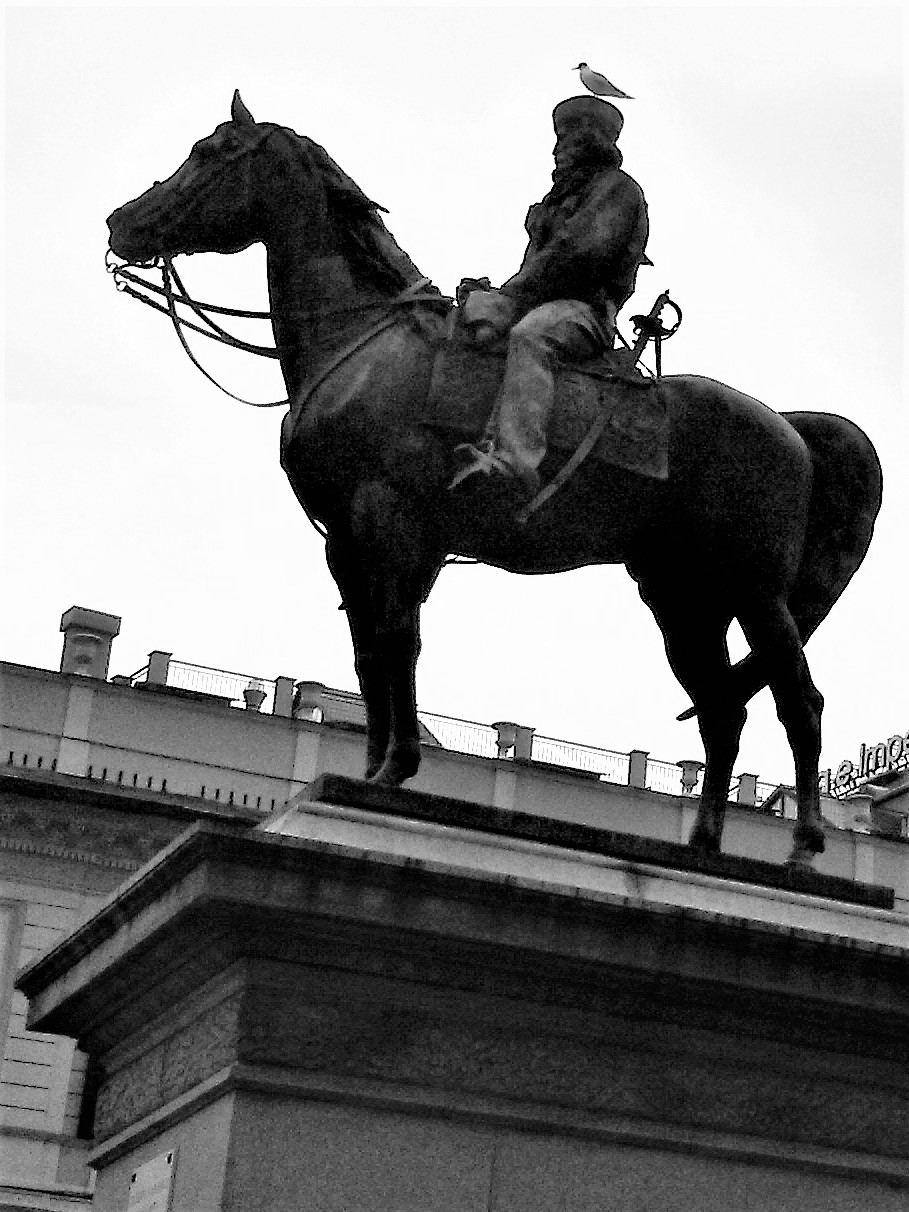
Monument to G.Garibaldi

We can consider the square being built between 1899 and 1983. The four eclectic palaces are contrasted by neoclassic examples of buildings such as the Teatro Carlo Felice and Accademia Ligustica di Belle Arti. Furthermore, next to Teatro Carlo Felice two streets branch out: Via Roma (elegant street enriched by boutiques and shops), flanked by Galleria Mazzini and Via XXV Aprile.

In front of the theatre is located a statue dedicated to Giuseppe Garibaldi, built by the Italian sculptor Augusto Rivalta in 1893.

At the centre of the square, in 1936, a bronze fountain was built. It was designed by the architect Giuseppe Crosa di Vergagni and it soon became one of the main symbols of the city.

During the 1990s, the square was architectonically renovated by the German urbanist and architect Bernhard Winkler and most of the attention went to the asphalt, the fountain and Palazzo Ducale. The square is now almost all for pedestrians.

== History ==
=== Piazza San Domenico ===
Where now lies the square, in the past it was nothing more than a triangular space which was named after San Domenico's Church. The church was demolished in the 1820s and on its soil was built Teatro Carlo Felice.

The square was enclosed by its omonym [sic?] church, a Dominican cloister, Palazzo Forcheri and other buildings. In the middle of the square there was a barchile (monumental fountain) from the year 1536.

Linked to Piazza San Domenico were to the east Via Giulia, Via dei Sellai (now named Via Cardinal Boetto) and to the west Via San Sebastiano. Most of today's square was taken by houses which were built at the foot of Colle San Andrea, then excavated at the beginning of the twentieth century.

=== The nineteenth century ===
==== First half of the century ====
After the incorporation of the former Ligurian Republic to the Sardinian Kingdom established in 1814 during the Congress of Vienna, a decision was made and the area were now Piazza De Ferrari is located was destined to become a social and cultural place of meeting. In addition to this, it was proposed to build a theatre where was located the former complex of San Domenico.

In 1818, King Vittorio Emanuele I authorised the demolition of the church. The church was then demolished and on its soil was built Teatro Carlo Felice which was inaugurated on April 7, 1828 (after two years of building).

Next to the theatre, on April 28, 1832, was inaugurated a two-stories building destined to become the headquarters of the Accademia Ligustica and of Biblioteca Berio.

In the following years, the square was linked to the port by the construction of Via San Lorenzo where now lies the Cathedral of San Lorenzo. Other than being linked to several important streets such as Strada Balbi, Via Garibaldi (former Strada Nuova), Via Cairoli (former Strada Nuovissima) and Strada Giulia.

==== Second half of the century ====
During the second half of the century, several jobs on the road network were made and the square acquired its role of fulcrum of the city.

In 1868, Via Roma was built and next to it was built a parallel covered street, Galleria Mazzini.

On December 10, 1975, one year after the death of Raffaele De Ferrari, the square was dedicated to him.

In 1893, in front of Teatro Carlo Felice was inaugurated the monument dedicated to Giuseppe Garibaldi, built by Augusto Rivalta and during its ceremony, many important figures were present such as: Francesco Crispi, Stefano Canzio and Anton Giulio Barrili.

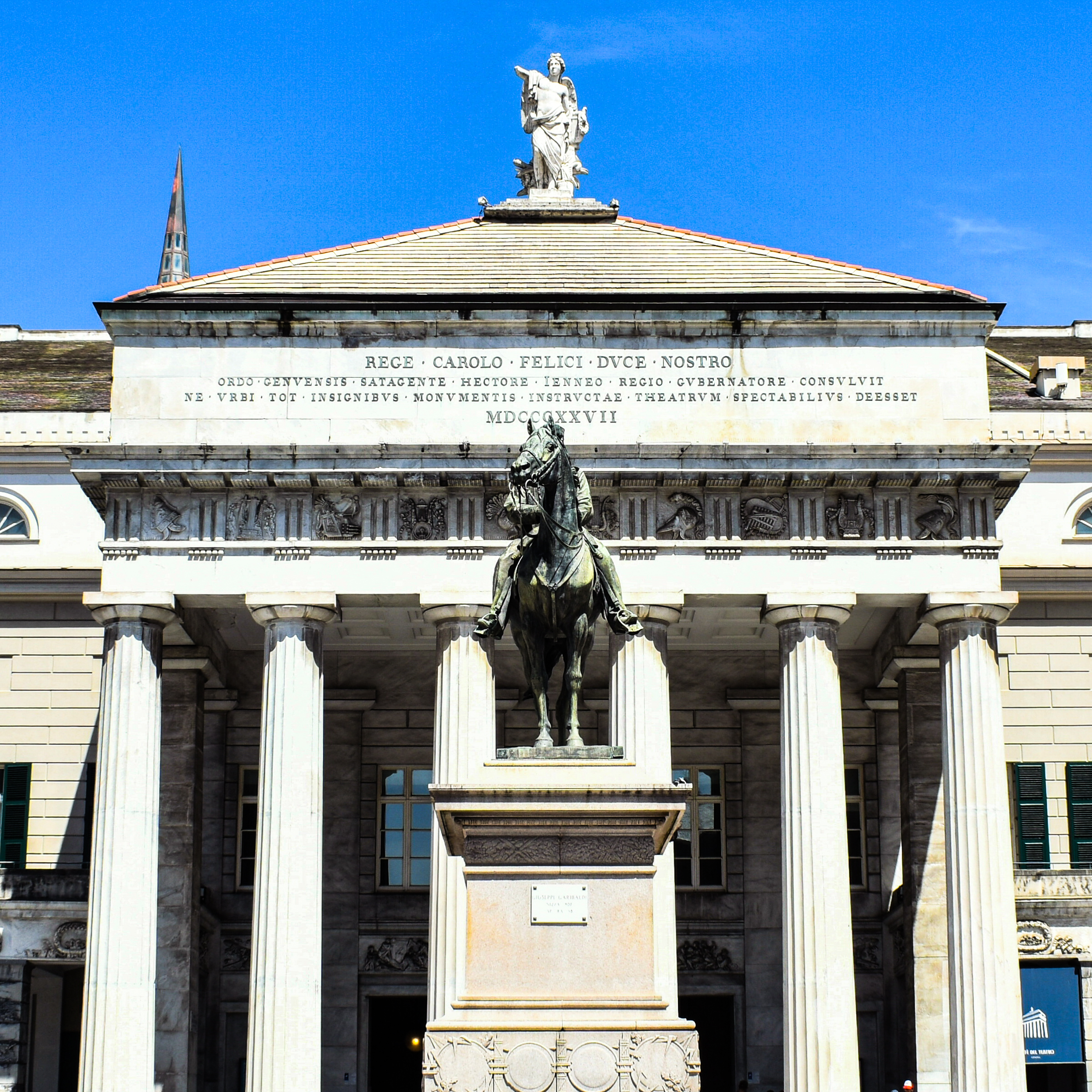
Monument to Giuseppe Garibaldi in front of Opera Carlo Felice

Until the last few years of the century, a fruit, vegetable and flower market took place in the square. The market was later moved in 1899 into the covered space of Mercato Orientale built on the northern side of Via XX Settembre.

=== The twentieth century ===
In 1904, the entirety of Colle Sant'Andrea was flattened and all of the houses built around it were demolished together with part of Barbarossa's Wall, dated 1155.

In 1912 the Palazzo della Nuova Borsa, located between Via Dante and Via XX Settembre, was inaugurated.

On April 24, 1936, at the centre of the square was inaugurated the bronze fountain, designed by Giuseppe Crosa di Vergagni, and its main bronze basin was donated by engineer Carlo Piaggio to celebrate Italy's entry into the war against Abissinia.

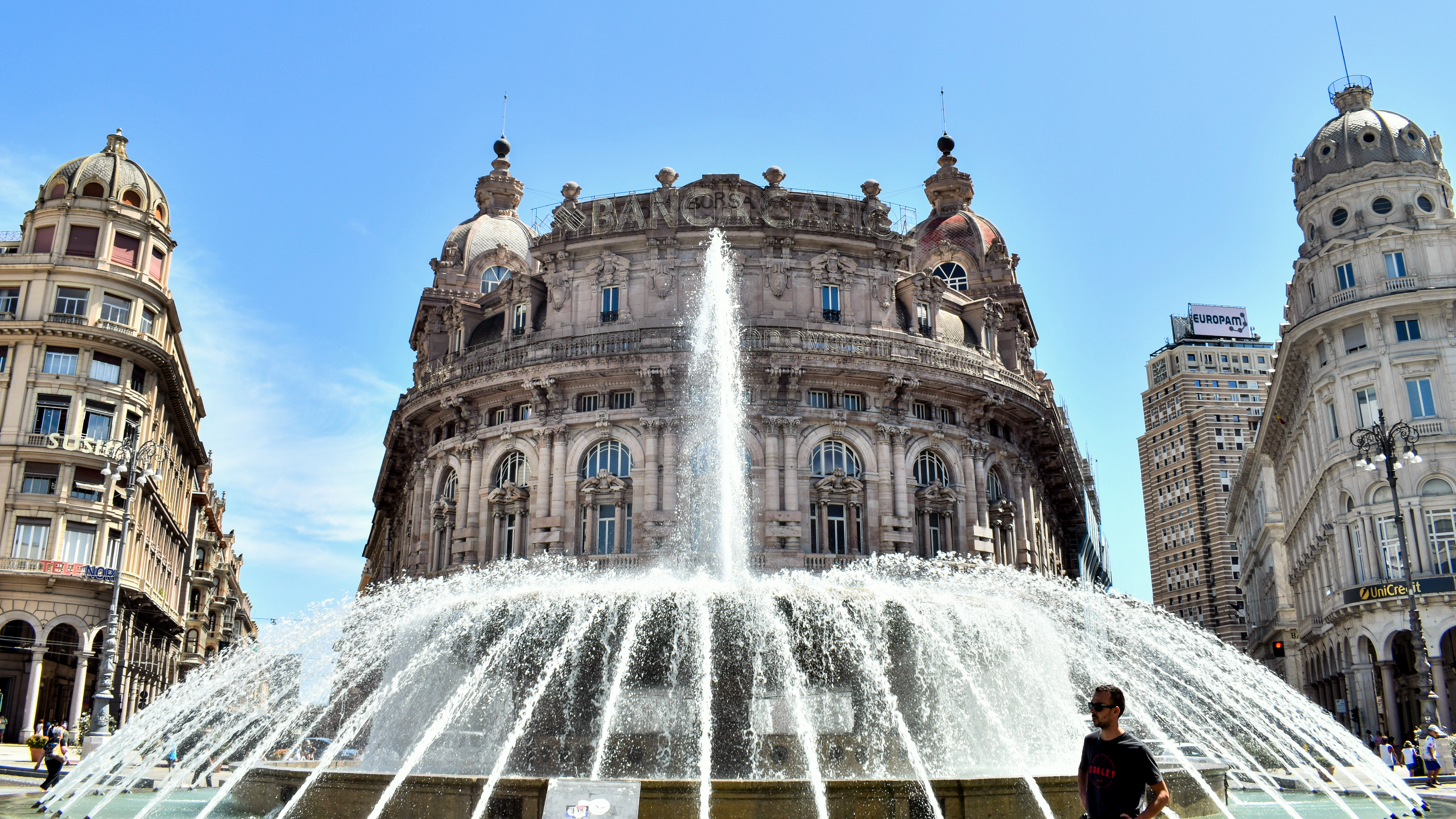
De Ferrari Fountain

==== World War II ====
During World War II, an air-raid destroyed Teatro Carlo Felice almost completely; only the perimeter walls and the neoclassic façade remained standing. The theatre was then rebuilt between 1987 and 1991. Finally in 1991 it was re-opened to the public.

Ahead of April 25, 1945, in the square there were violent battles between partisans and the Nazi German Army. In the following days, the square witnessed events linked to the liberation with the descent of the partisans from the mountains who came to participate in the liberation parade. On April 25, the enemy troops, headed by Günter Meinhold, surrendered to the partisans headed by Remo Scappini (Comitato di Liberazione Nazionale). Meinhold signed the act of surrender in Villa Migone; at the time it was the house of the Cardinal of Genoa. This was the only case in Italy in which the German Army surrendered to Partisan troops and not to the allied forces, who had not arrived yet.

==== After the war ====
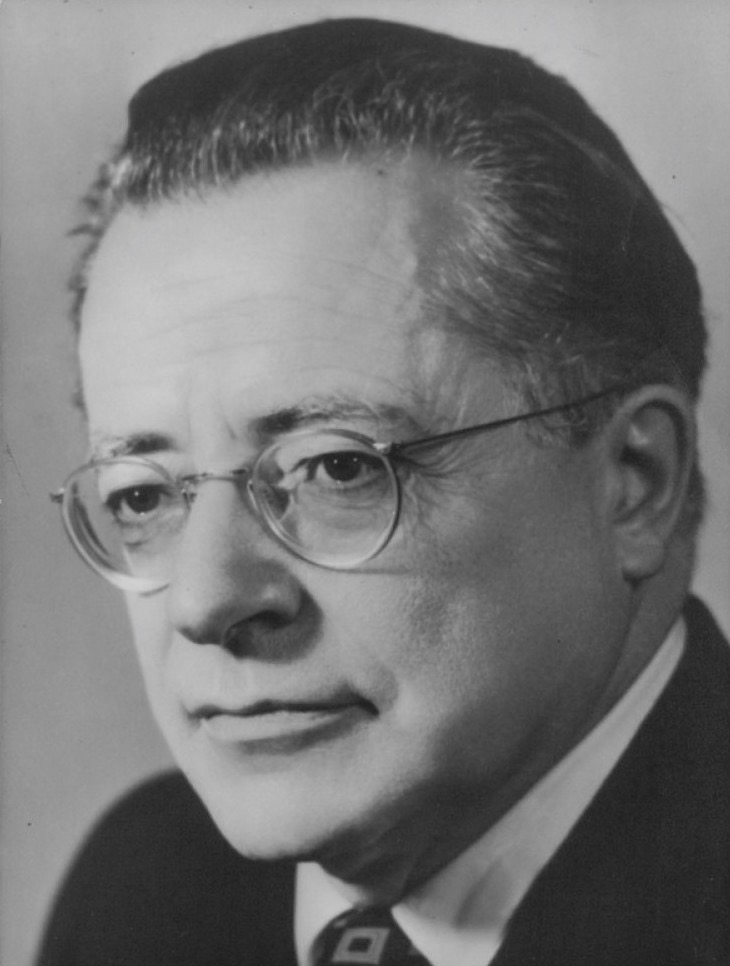
Palmiro Michele Nicola Togliatti

The square was a meeting point for most protests. In 1948, Piazza De Ferrari was where the large protest for the assassination attempt of Palmiro Togliatti (former leader of the Italian Communist Party) took place. The three gunshots were taken by Antonio Pallante, a anticommunist and law student, in Rome on April 18, 1948. Protests took place in the whole country in the aftermath, but Genoa's population reacted with more intensity due to the large communist presence among the people and because Togliatti was born in Genoa, even if he moved to Sardinia early in life and lived in Turin and Russia for the majority of his adult life.

==== June 30th 1960 ====
On June 30, 1960, the majority of Genoa's population was opposed to the congress of the Italian Social Movement authorised by the government, headed by Demochristian Fernando Tambroni. At the congress, Carlo Emanuele Basile (former prefect of Genoa during the Italian Social Republic) would have also made an appearance, a fact which contributed to the authorisation granted by Tambroni. A major part of the protests, which happened to be violent, took place in the square.

=== The twenty-first century ===
==== July 2001—G8 ====
Central access to the zona rossa (red zone) during the G8 meeting in Palazzo Ducale, the nearby areas were crowded by protestors who tried to enter the square. Being the square closed to the public, the protest moved to different areas of the city which caused the massacres of Piazza Alimonda and to Diaz School.

==== Renovation process of the square ====
The square was heavily renovated during the 1990s and in the first couple of years of the 2000s for the Colombians Celebrations for the 500th anniversary of the discovery of America and for the G8 meeting of 2001. The project was guided by German urbanist and architect Bernhard Winkler. The square was widely pedestrianised and re-paved and the fountain was enriched with new water springs and with a supplementary basin.

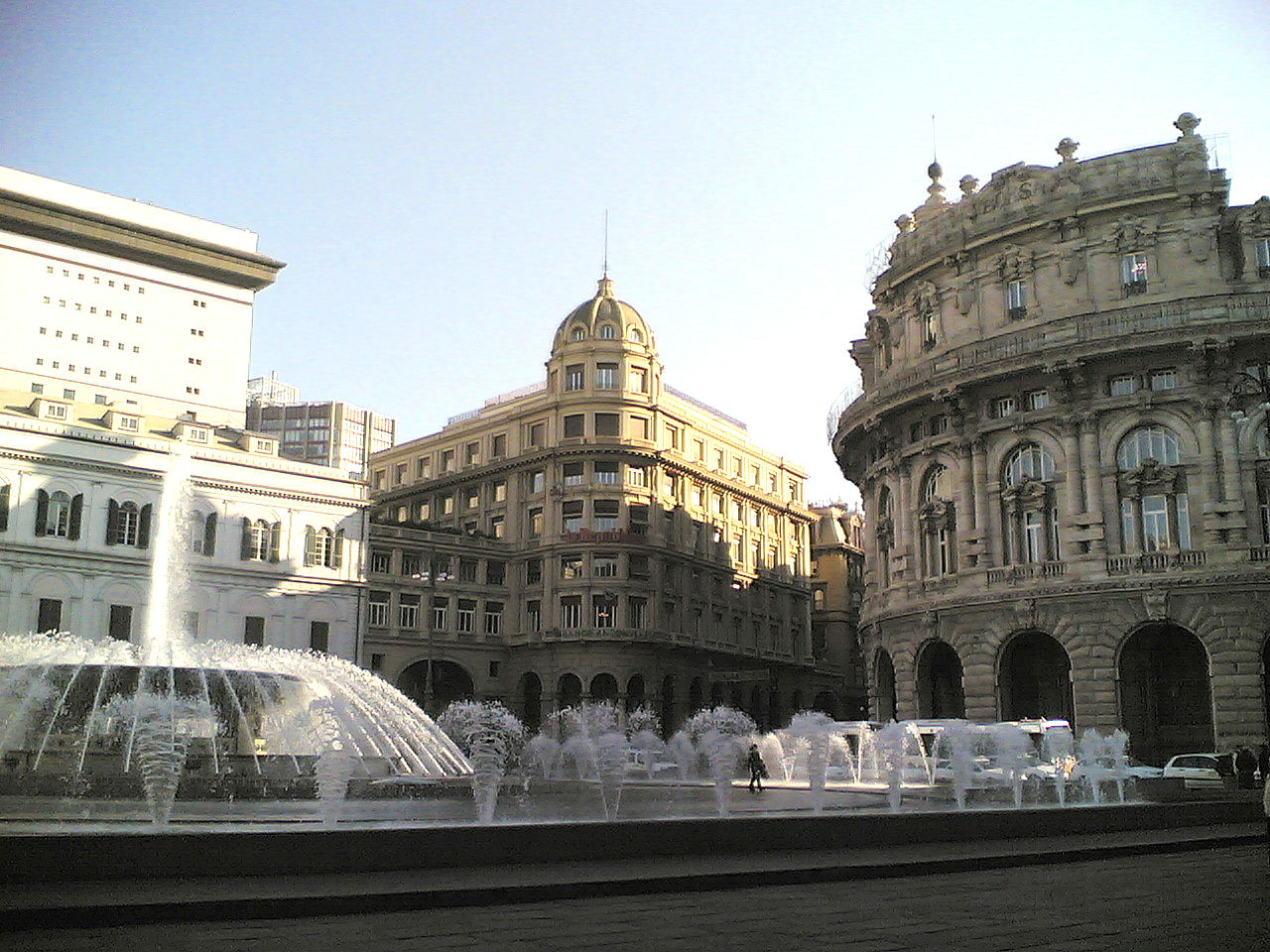
De Ferrari Fountain and its lateral jets

Since the beginning of the 2000s, due to high consumption of water and to infiltrations in the metro station beneath the square, the new water jets were often disabled. Finally, in 2018, the streams were renovated and the water recycling system was updated.

== Historical palaces ==
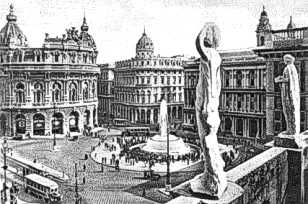
An old postcard of Piazza De Ferrari

Next to the square are several historical palaces and buildings.

- The Palace of the Doges
- The headquarters of the Ligurian Region (the former Palazzo Italia di Navigazione)
- The palace of the Ligurian Academy of Fine Arts, founded in 1741
- The Theatre Carlo Felice, with its neoclassic pronao designed by the Italian architect Carlo Barabino and the equestrian statue of Giuseppe Garibaldi, work of the Italian sculptor Augusto Rivalta
- The stock exchange building, built in 1912 by the architect Alfredo Coppedè
- The palace of the Duke of Galliera, Raffaele De Ferrari, to whom the square is dedicated

== Public transport ==
An underground station of the Genoa Metro opened at Piazza De Ferrari on February 4, 2005. The square is also served by the Genoa trolleybus system – by route 30 since 1997 and by route 20 since 2008.

== Gallery ==
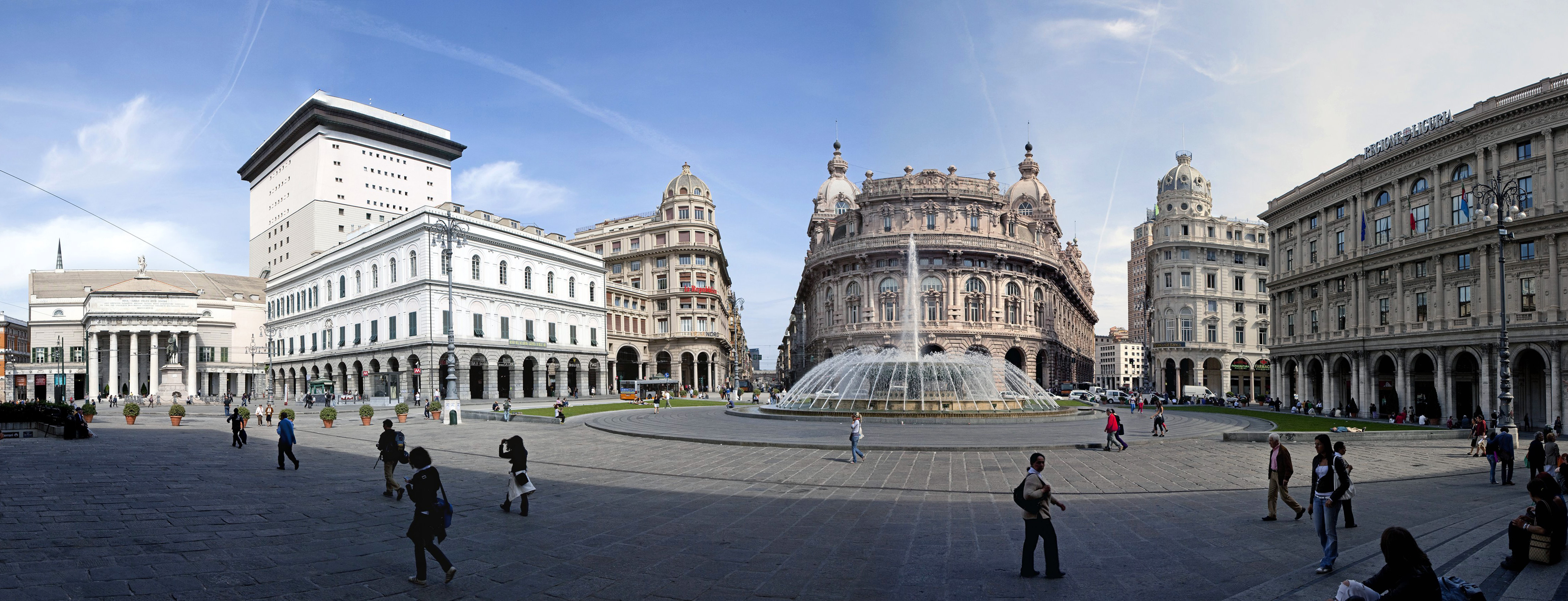
Panorama of the square

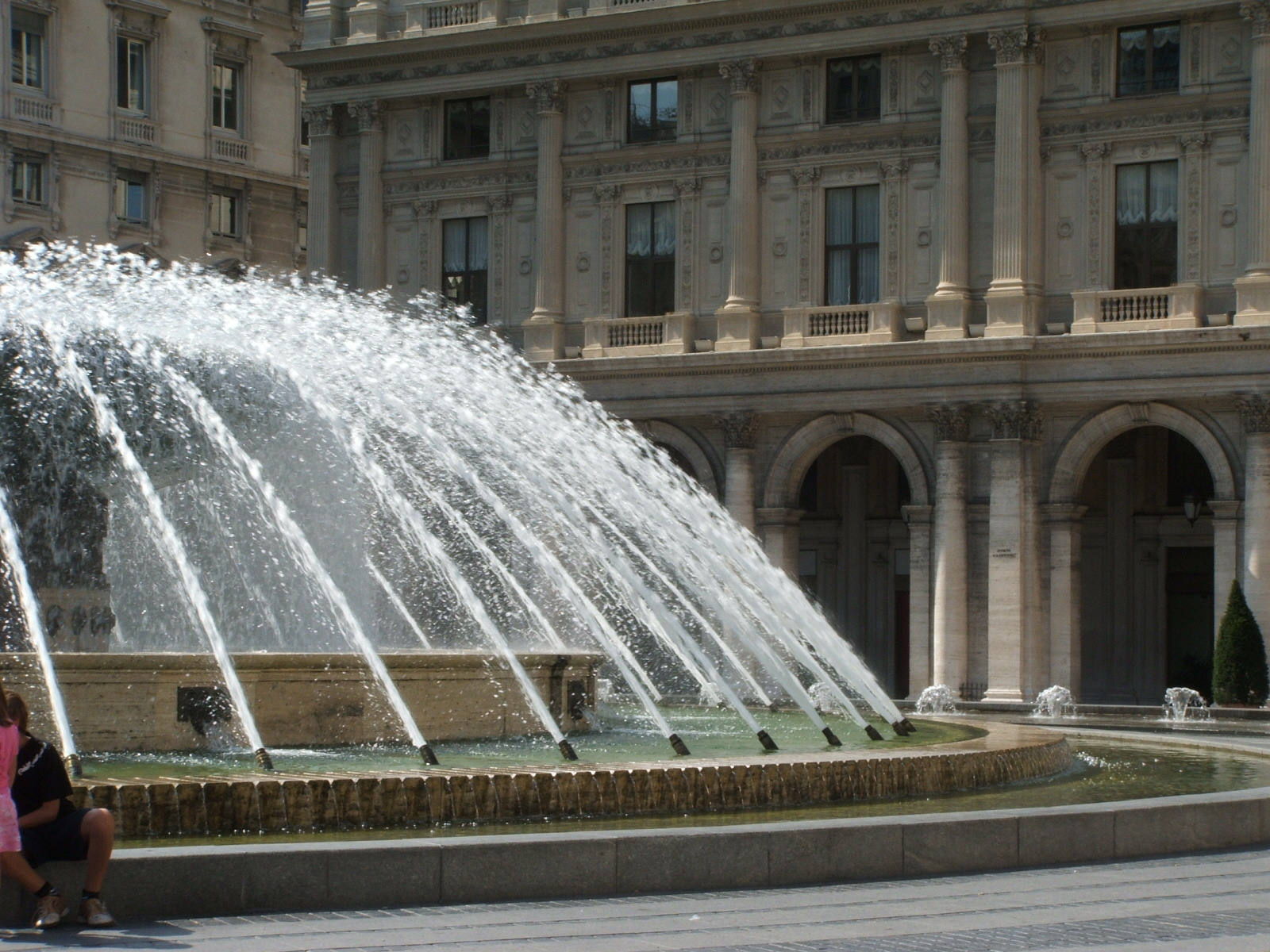
Water playing on the fountain

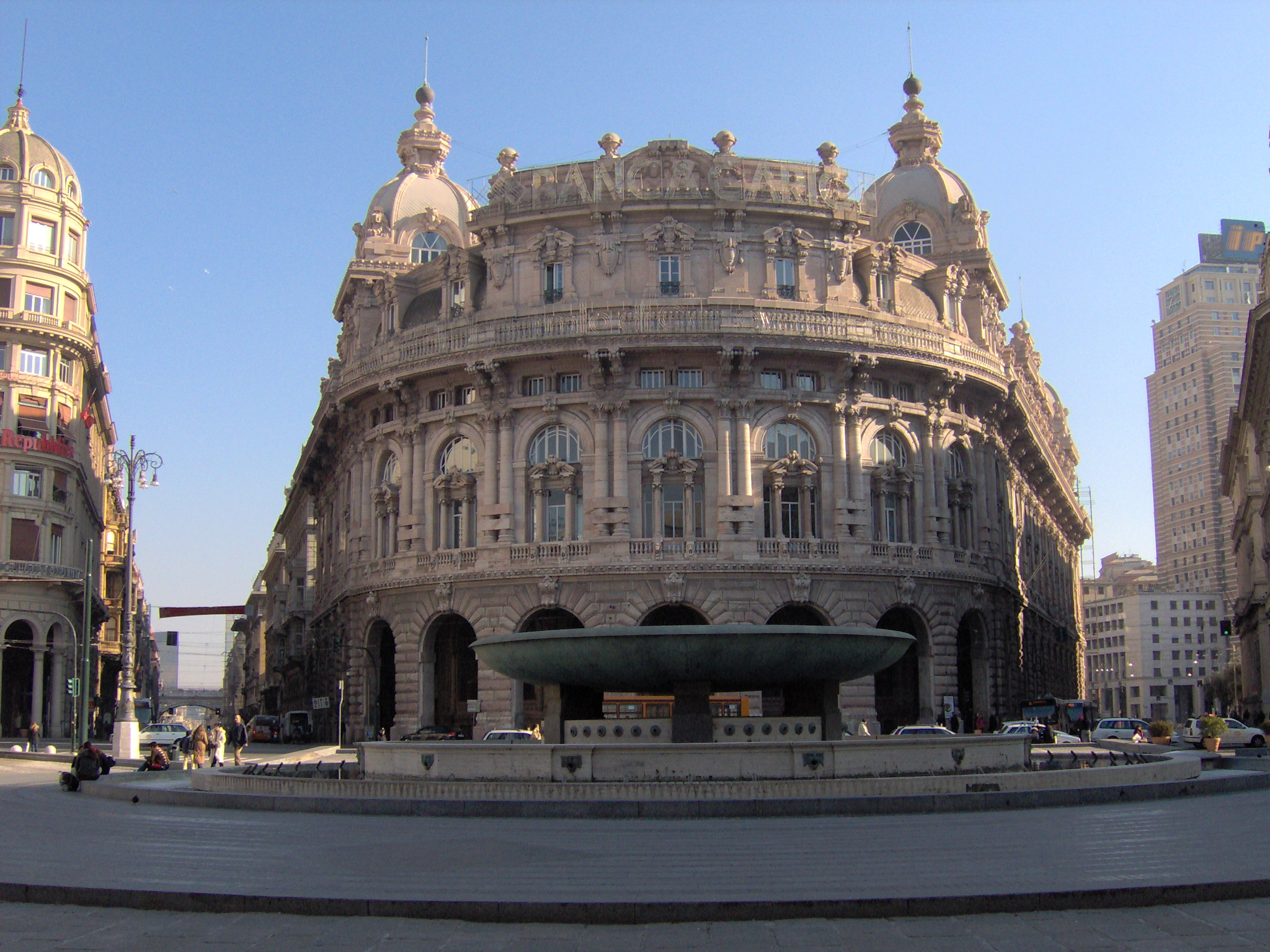
The palace of the New Stock Exchange

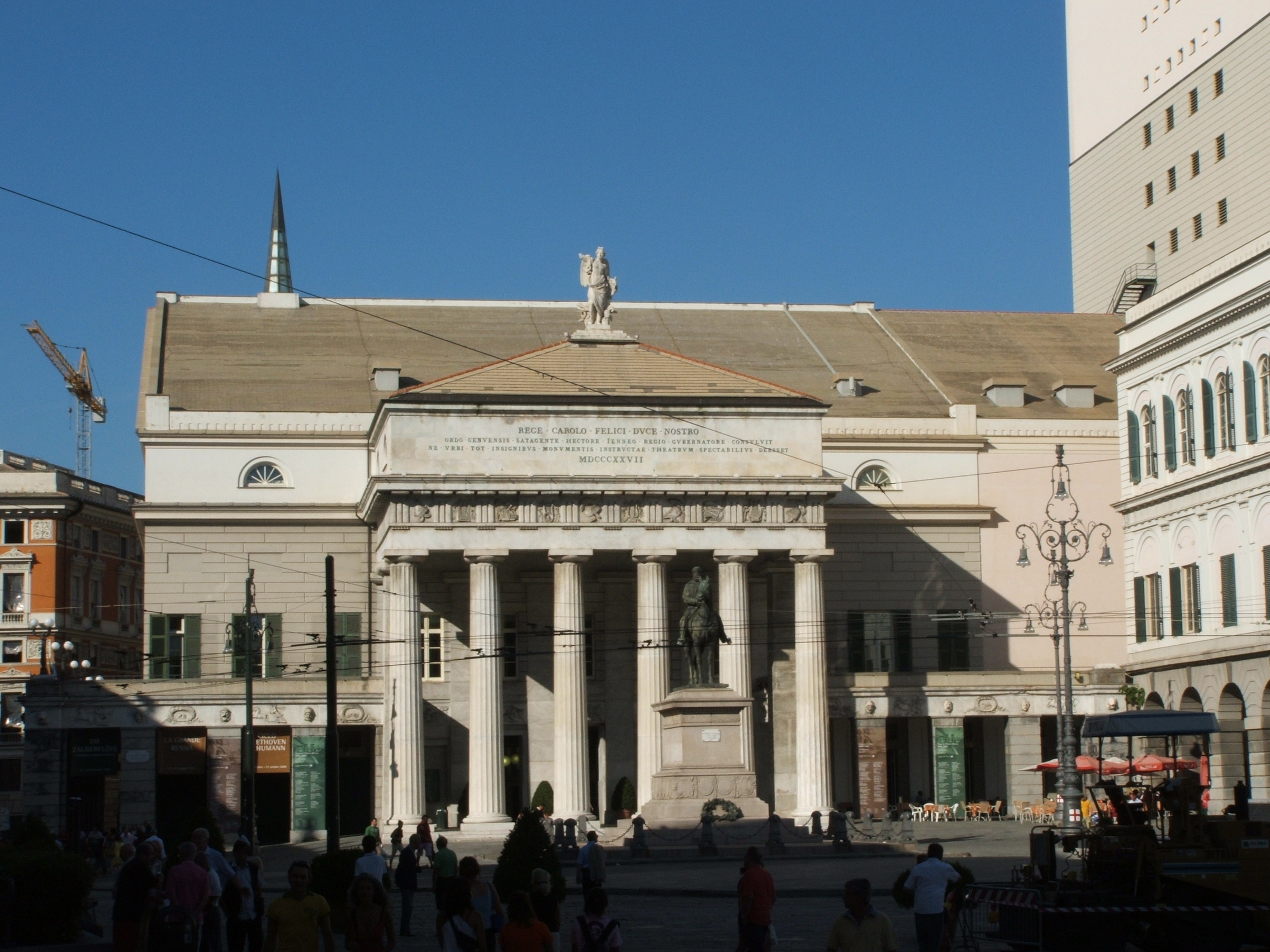
The Carlo Felice Theater

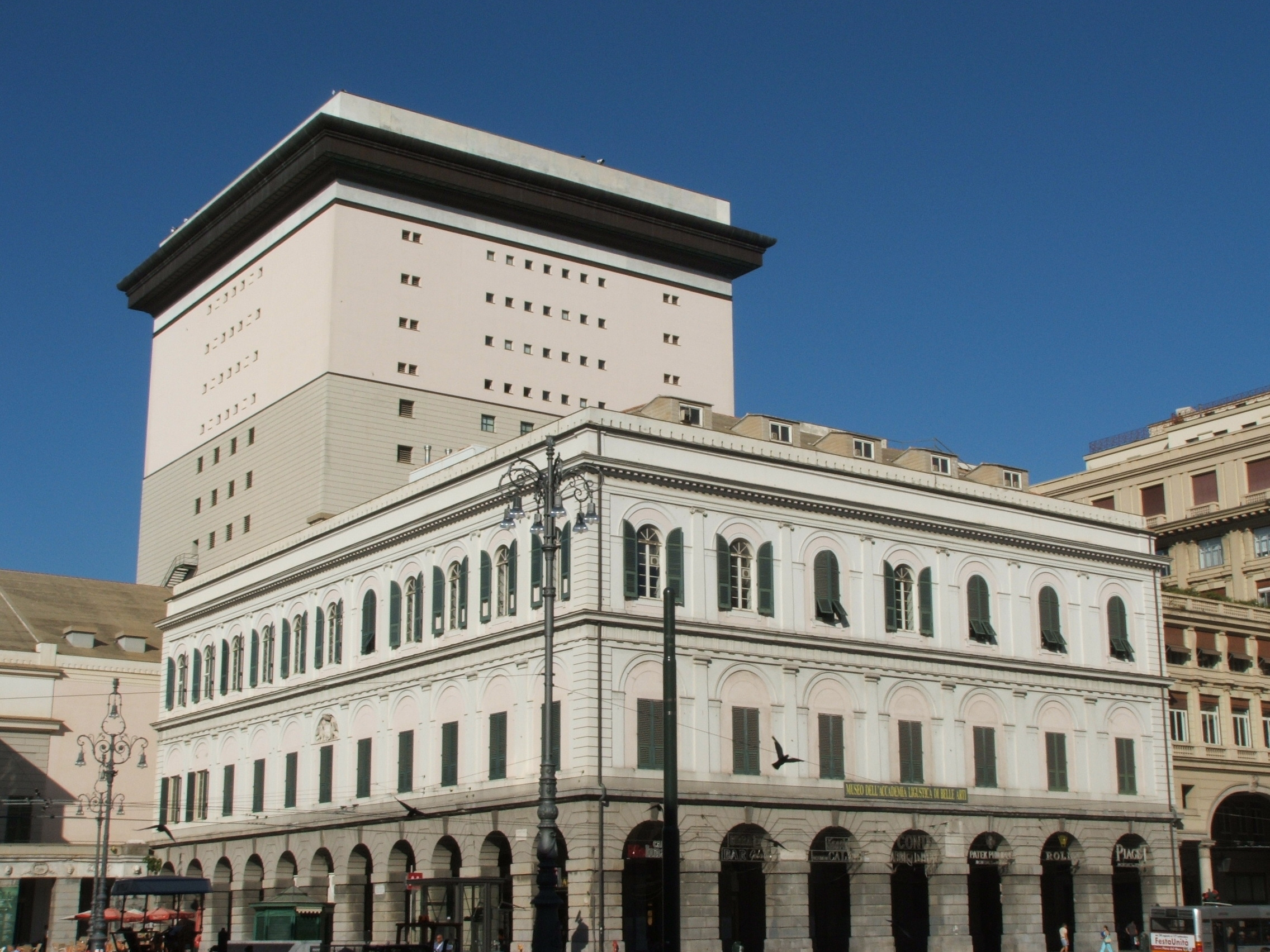
The Palace of the Ligustica Academy and in the background the scenic tower of Carlo Felice

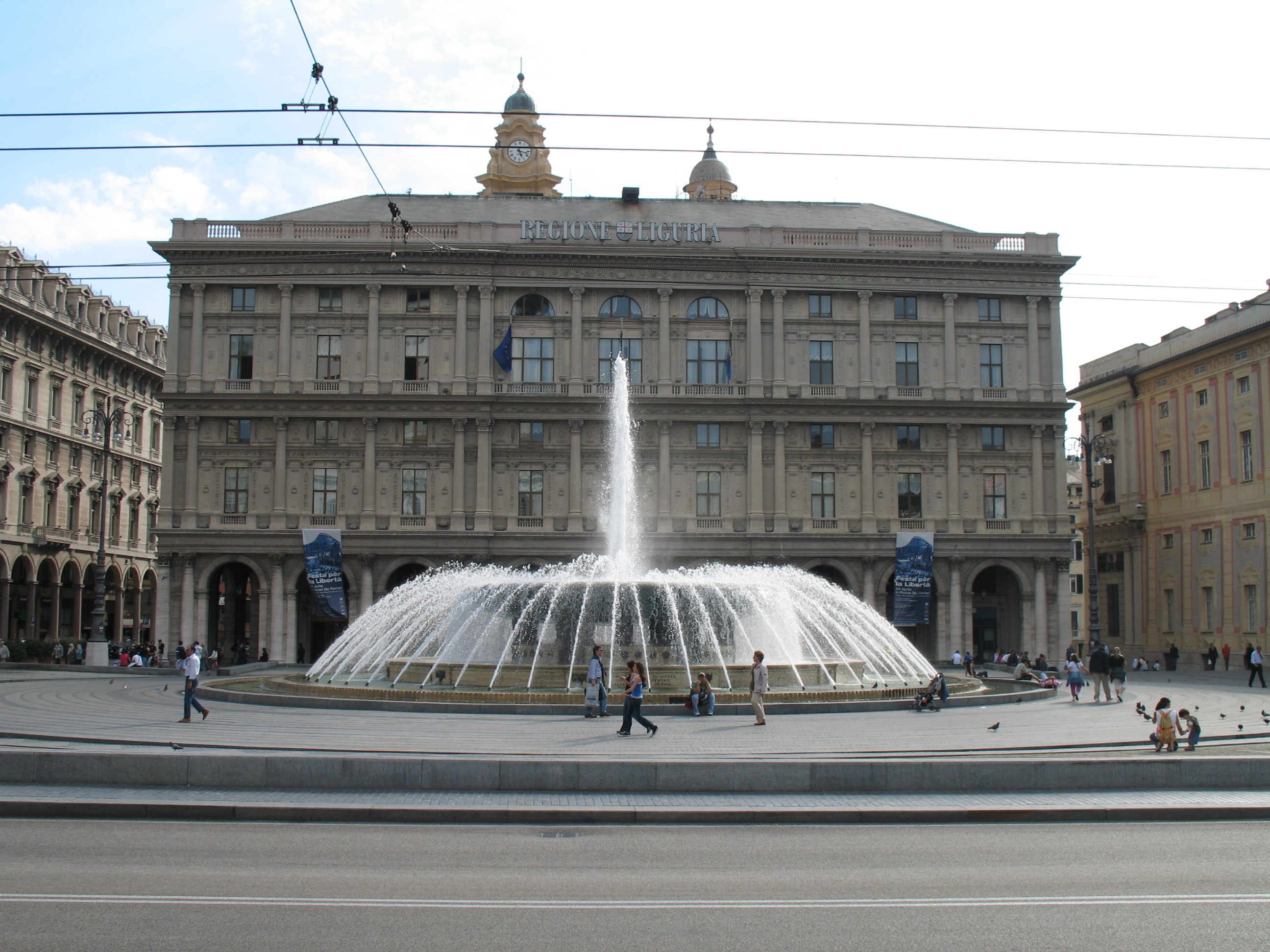
The Palace of the Italian Navigation Society (now the Liguria Region)

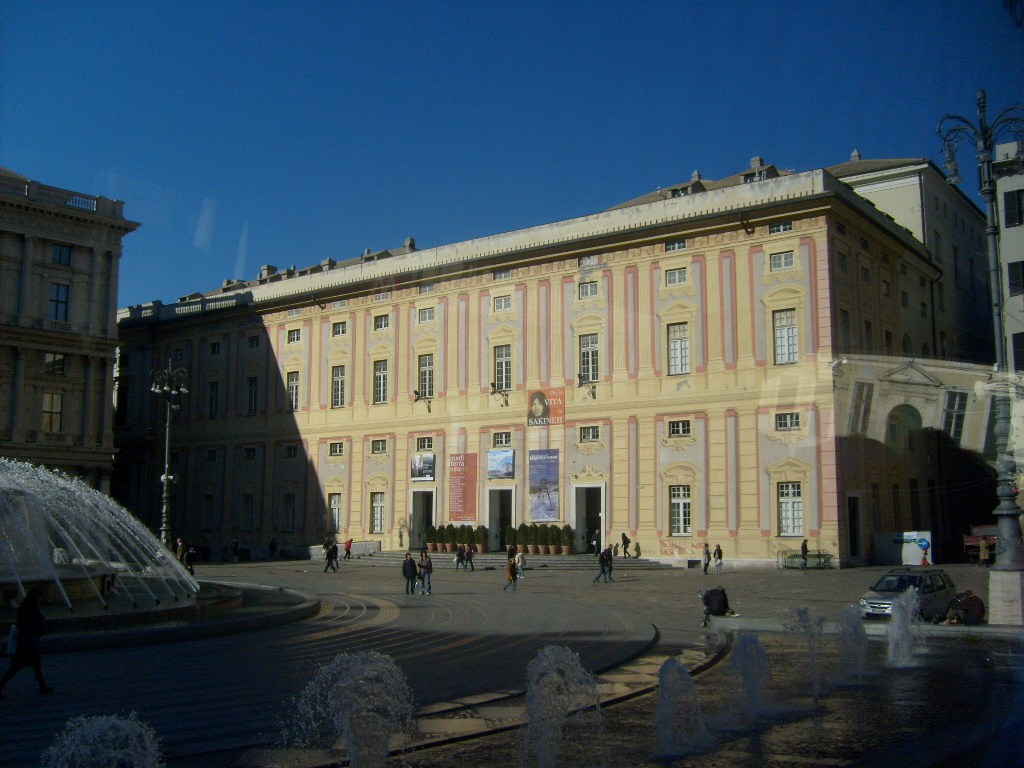
The laterale side of the Ducal Palace

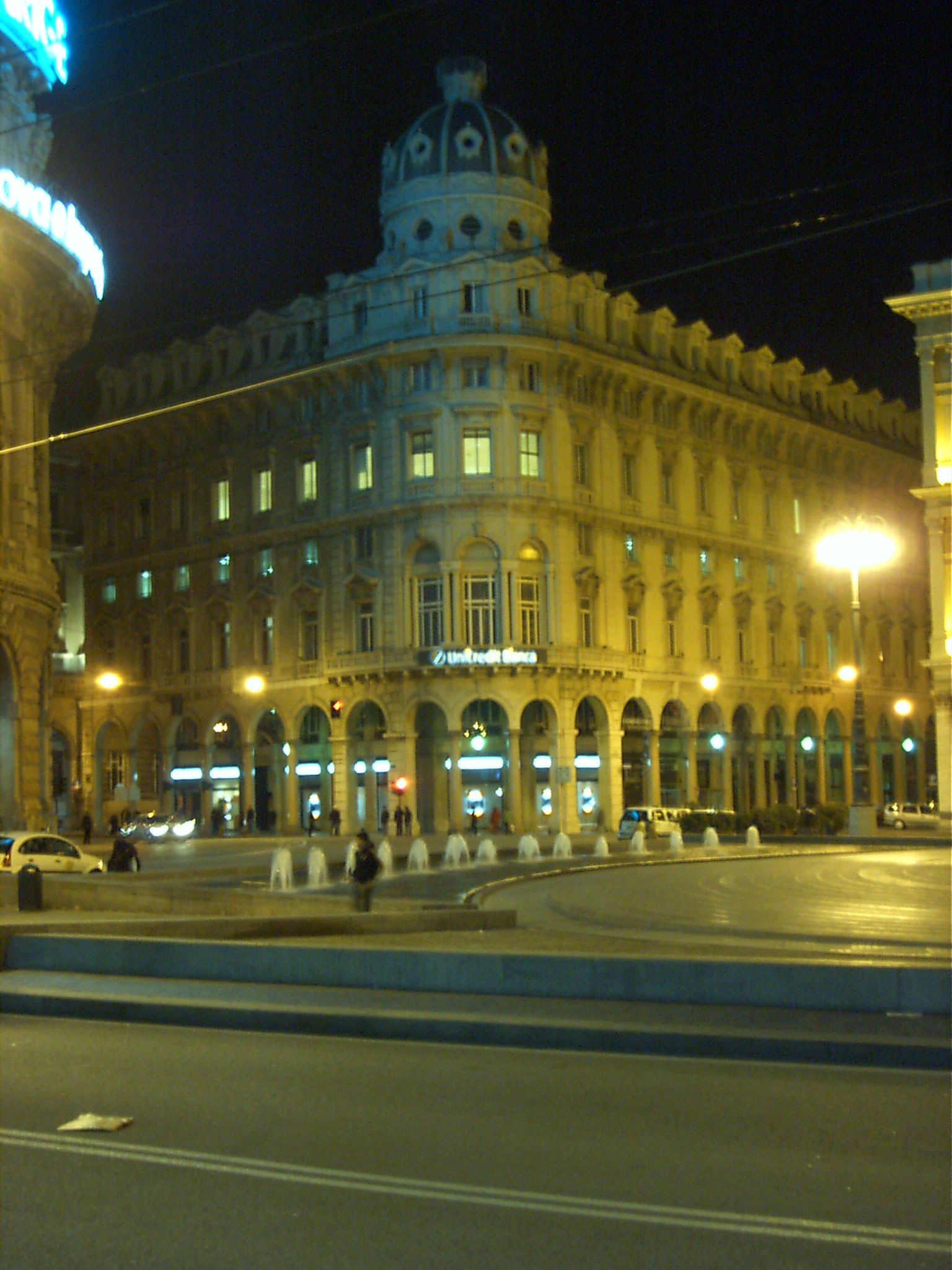
The Palace of the Italian Credit

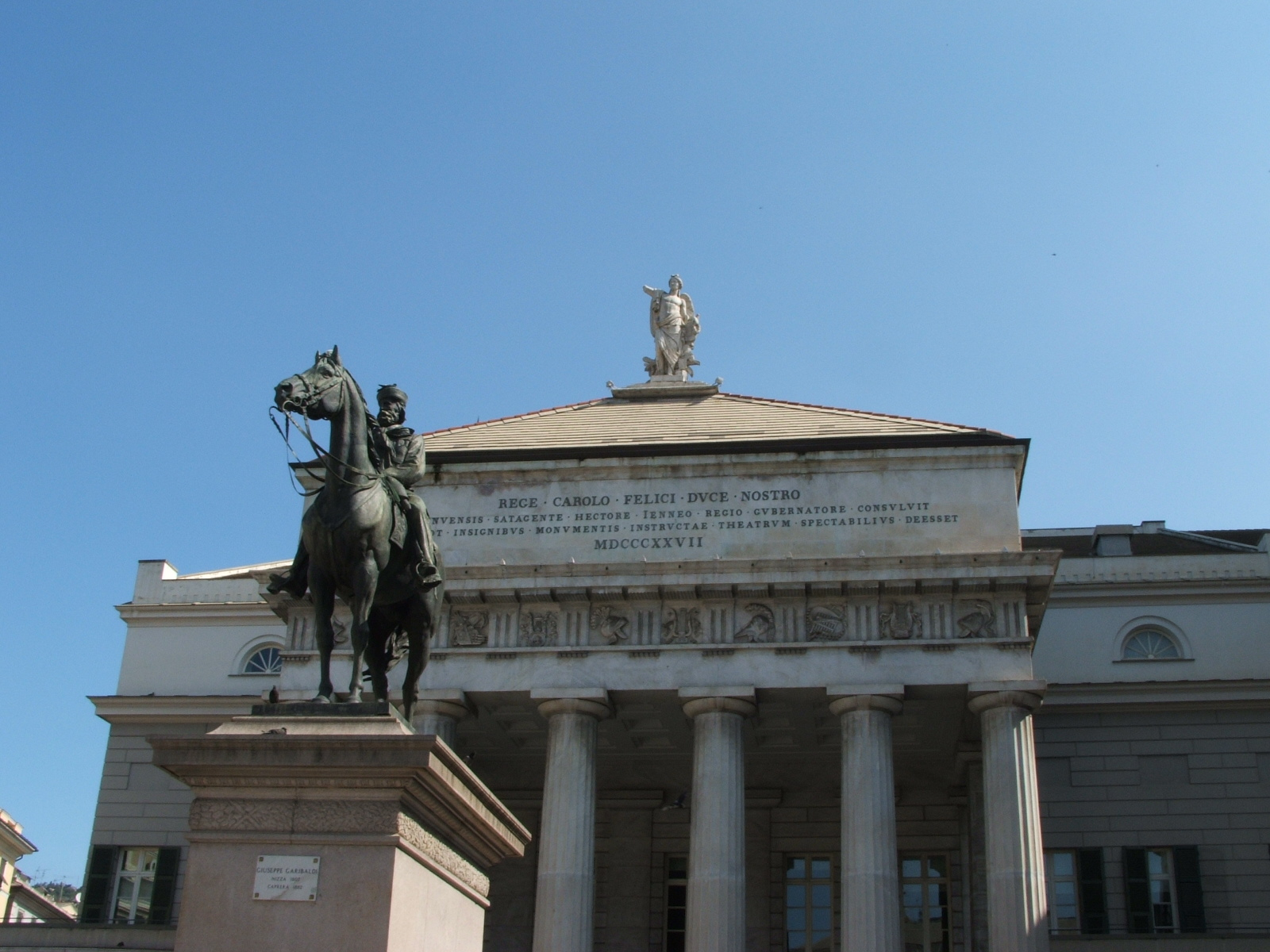
The monument to Garibaldi
