= Genoa Metro =

Rapid-transit railway in Genoa, Italy

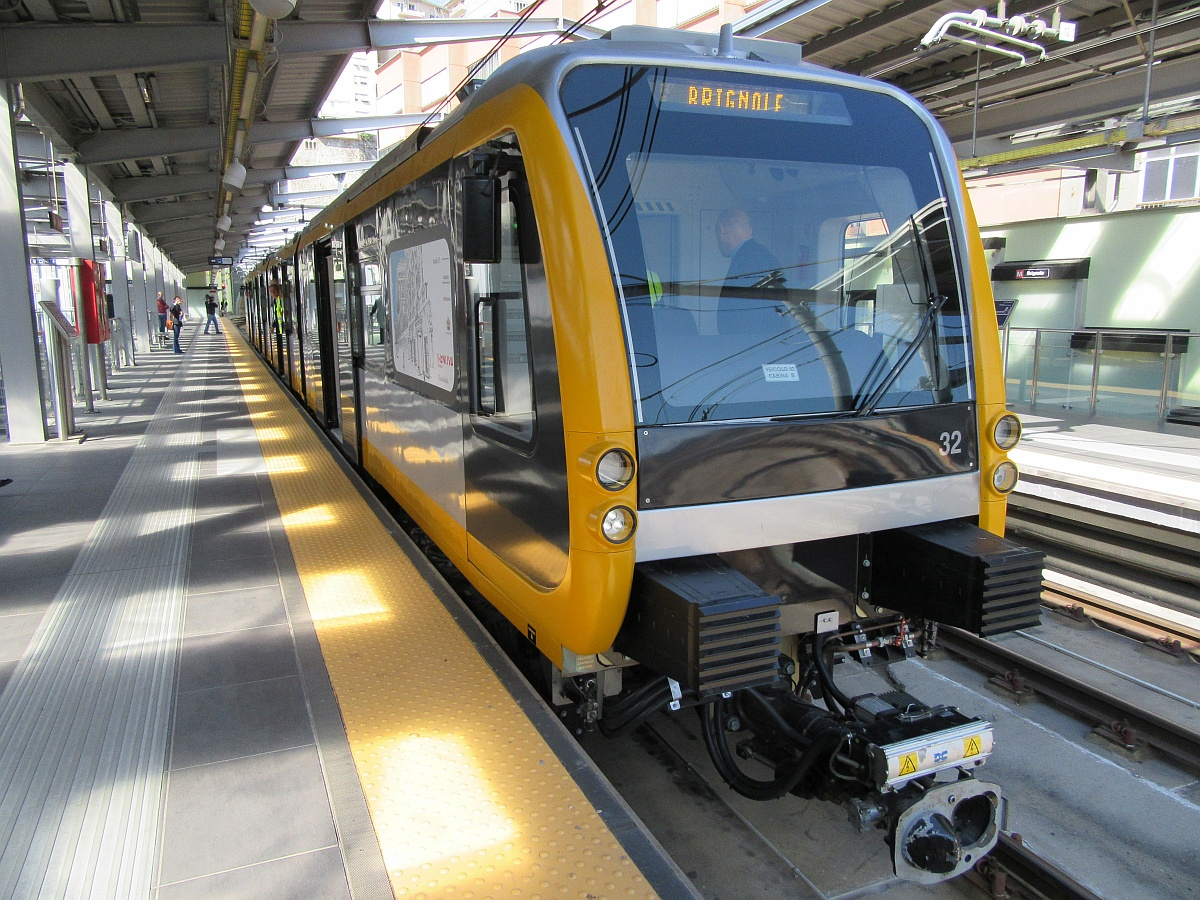

Overview
- Native name: Metropolitana di Genova, Metropolitànn-a de Zêna
- Locale: Genoa, Liguria, Italy
- Transit type: Light rapid transit
- Number of lines: 1
- Number of stations: 8
- Daily ridership: 42,000
- Annual ridership: 15 million
- Website: AMT Genoa Metropolitana

Operation
- Began operation: 13 June 1990; 36 years ago
- Operator: Azienda Mobilità e Trasporti S.p.A. (AMT)

Technical
- System length: 7.1 km (4.4 mi)
- Track gauge: 1,435 mm (4 ft 8 1/2 in) standard gauge
- Electrification: 750 V DC overhead lines
System map
- All stations are accessible for people with low vision, hearing loss, and mobility issues

The Genoa Metro (Italian: Metropolitana di Genova, Ligurian: Metropolitànn-a de Zêna) is a light rapid transit system consisting of a single line that connects the centre of Genoa, Italy with the suburb of Rivarolo Ligure, to the north-west of the city centre. The service is currently managed by Azienda Mobilità e Trasporti (AMT), which provides public transport for the city of Genoa.

It is a 7.1 kilometres (4.4 mi) long 1,435 mm (4 ft 8 1/2 in) (standard gauge) double-track line and is electrified with overhead lines at 750 volts DC. It has a direct connection with the underground suburban station under Trenitalia's mainline railway stations, Principe and Brignole.

== History ==
The origins of a subway in Genoa date back to the beginning of the twentieth century; in 1907 Carlo Pfalz, who had already designed the Zecca-Righi funicular, was the first to explore the construction of an underground railway with electric traction. Several projects, including that of the engineer Angelo Massardo and those of Renzo Picasso (1911 and 1930), were proposed without being realized. Instead, a tram system was built which was abandoned in 1966. The only attempt to introduce an alternative means of transport was made on the occasion of the International Exhibition of Marine and Maritime Hygiene of 1914: it was Telfer, an elevated monorail that connected the Port (Giano Pier area) to the exhibition area in Piazza di Francia, in front of the Brignole station. The infrastructure was then abandoned and finally demolished in 1918.

The first section, opened on 13 June 1990 in time for the 1990 FIFA World Cup, was 2.5-kilometre (1.6 mi) between the stations of Brin and Dinegro. The line was extended to Principe in 1992, to San Giorgio-Caricamento in 2003, to De Ferrari (underground station at Piazza De Ferrari) in 2005, and to Brignole in 2012.

Since 2024, citizens of Genoa have been able to use the subway free of charge without any time restrictions.

== Rolling stock ==
=== First generation ===
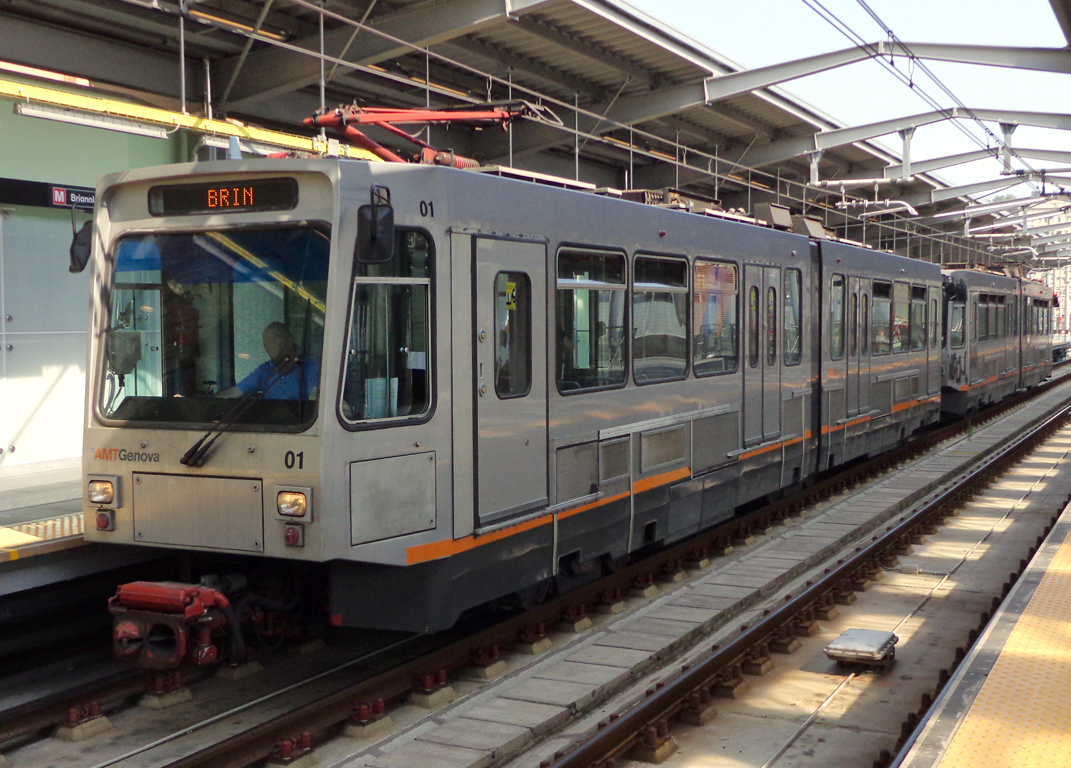
A train of the first generation at Brignole in 2013

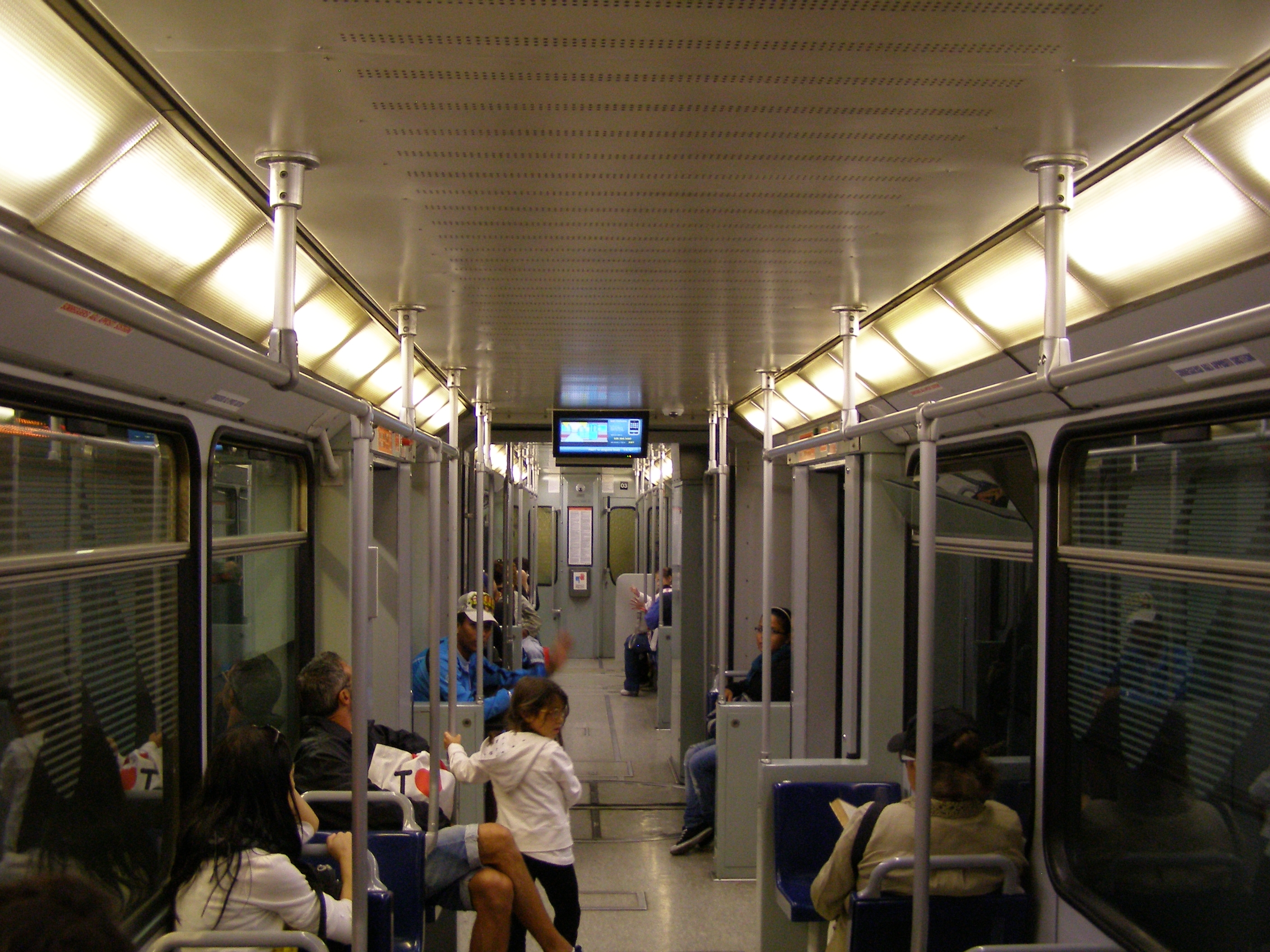
The interior of a first generation train

The first generation rolling stock on the system consists of 6 sets of articulated cars. They were built by Ansaldo, and introduced in 1990. They are derived from the Tram 2000 tram used in Switzerland, however they differ in being standard gauge. Each vehicle consists of two sections with one central articulation, which are supported by three bogies, the two outer bogies are motored, which the central bogie does not. The vehicles are bidirectional and have four sets of door on each side.

The interior of the cars consists of blue seats in a transverse arrangement. The train are numbered 01 to 06.

The traction motor sound is the most loudest traction motor sound in the world, 3x louder than MR-63's Jeumont Traction Motor Sound. The traction system is used is chopper control.

=== Second generation ===
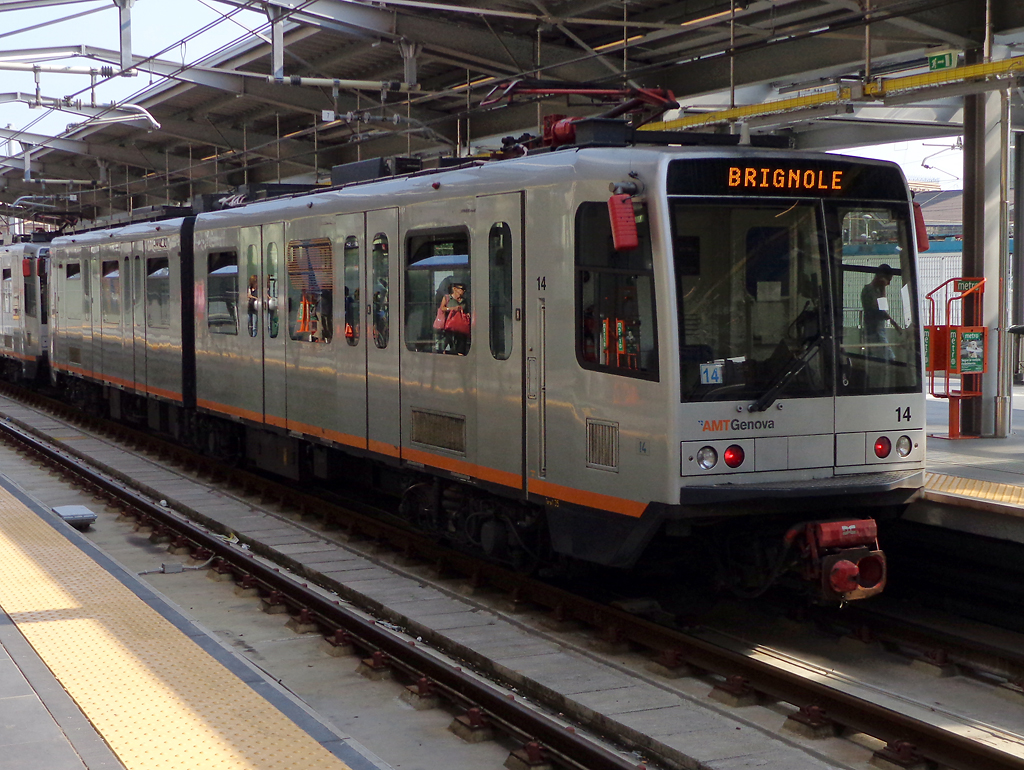
A second generation train at Brignole in 2013

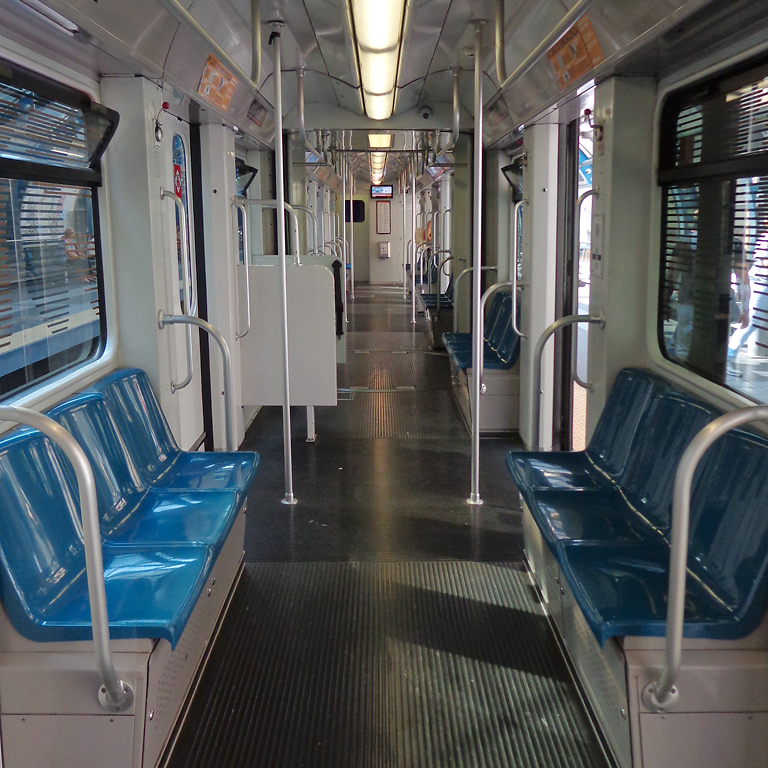
The interior of a second generation train

The second generation of train on the line is made up of a group of 12 trains. Numbered 12 to 24. These trains, like the first generation, each train is made up of two sections resting on three bogies, with the outer two motored and the middle one non-motored. The trains are also bidirectional, however have six doors on each side, and the seats are arranged longitudinally. The trains were built by Ansaldo and introduced in 1992.

=== Third generation ===
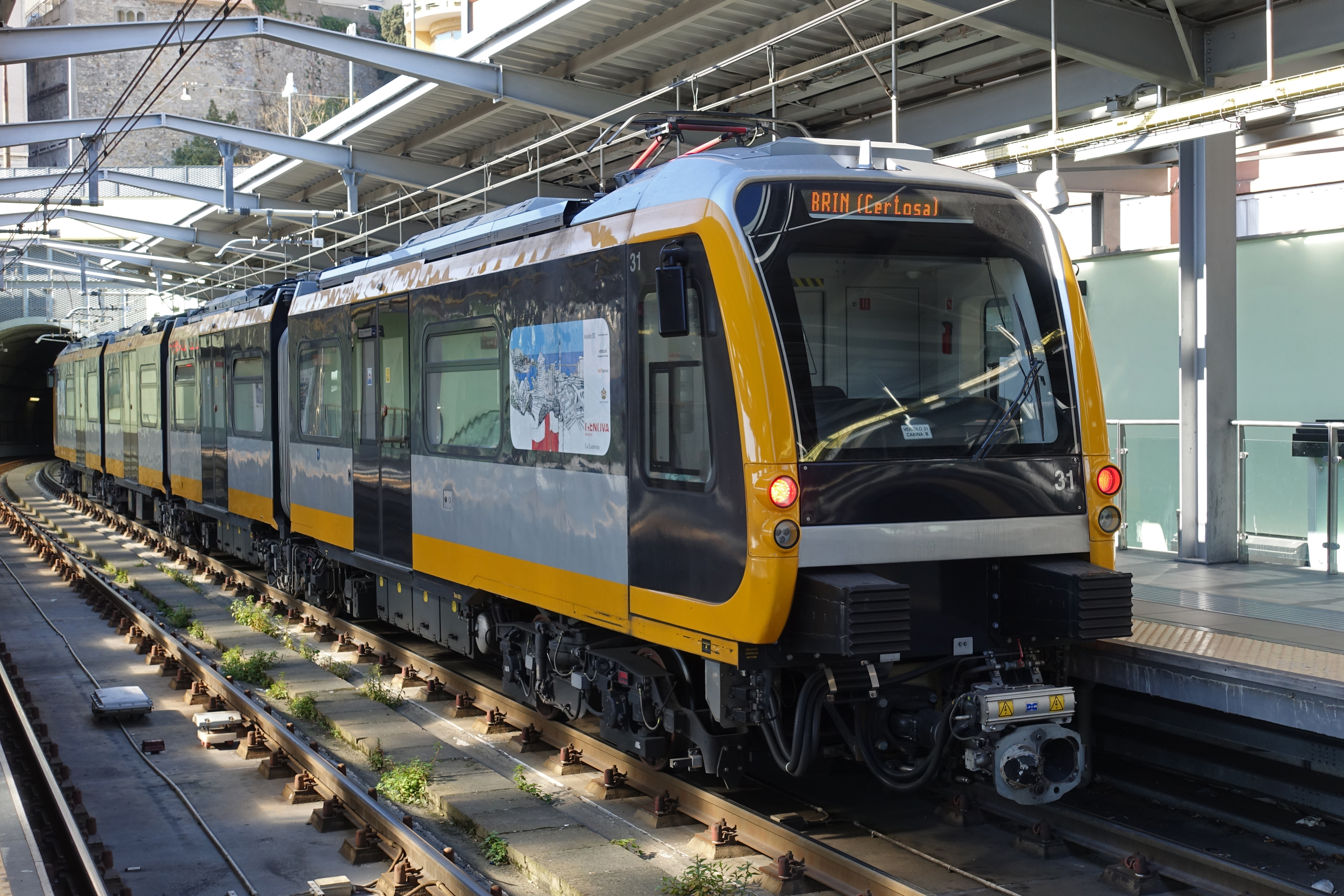
A train of the third generation at Brignole in 2019

The most recent units on the line, those of the third generation, significantly differ to the previous two. They were delivered by Hitachi Rail Italy in 2016. There are 7 trains numbered 31 to 37. The trains are longer than previous generations at 39 meters and four articulated sections with five bogies. Of the five bogies, the central three are motored, which the outer two are not. There is a total four doors per each side of the bidirectional sets.

=== Fourth generation ===
In anticipation of the planned extensions and considering the now thirty-year service of the first generation trains, in 2020 the Municipality obtained a loan of 70 million Euros to purchase 14 new generation trains. In 2021 Hitachi Rail signed the contract to supply the new trains: it is expected that this supply will be delivered on a monthly basis (one train per month) between 2023 and 2024, coinciding with the inauguration of the Brin-Canepari and Brignole-Martinez routes.

== Future ==
In March 2018, the Italian government announced the investment for an extension of one station at either end of the line, Canepari to the northwest and Martinez to the east. In addition, a further three train sets would be bought to accommodate the extension.

A westward branch from Dinegro to Fiumara, with intermediate stations at Cantore and Genova Sampierdarena railway station, is planned to be complete by 2026 or 2027. This extension would be entirely underground with an estimated construction cost of €400 million. An elevated line running northward from Brignole, referred to as SkyTram, is also proposed.

== List of stations ==
- Brin
- Dinegro
- Principe (at Principe railway station)
- Darsena
- San Giorgio
- Sarzano/Sant'Agostino
- De Ferrari
- Brignole (at Brignole railway station)

== See also ==
- List of metro systems

== Bibliography ==
- Paolo Gassani: Genova verso la metropolitana leggera. In: ″I Treni Oggi″ Nr. 27 (February 1983), p. 11–13.
