= Brignole (Genoa Metro) =

Genoa Metro station

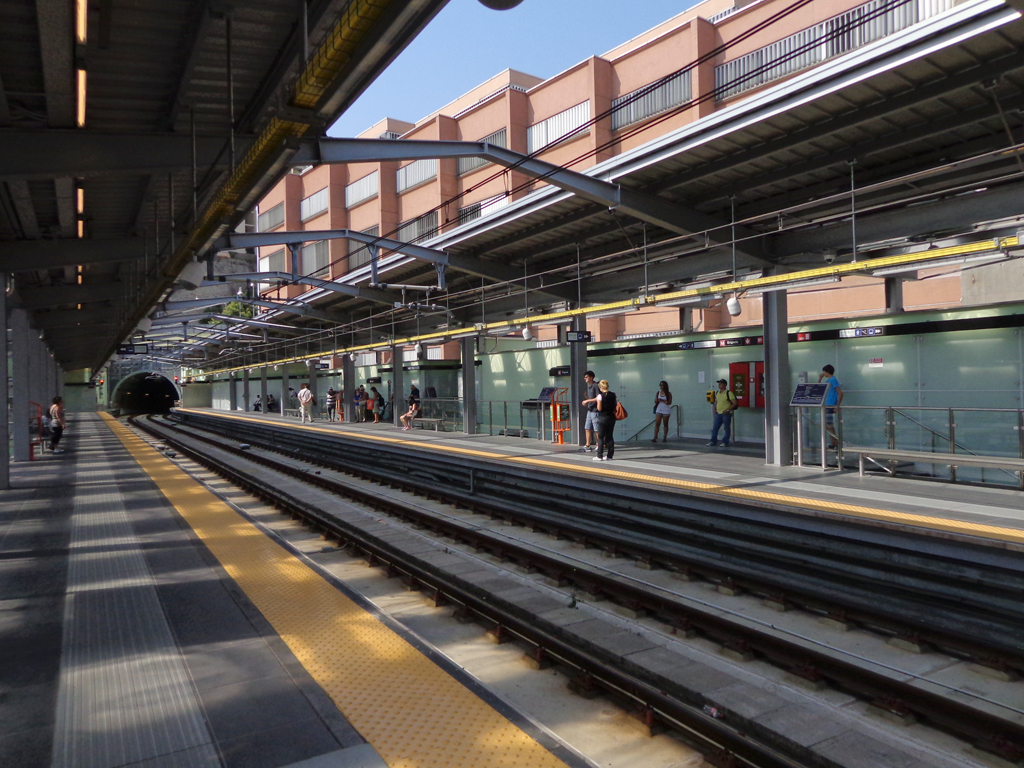

General information
- Location: Italy
- Coordinates: 44°24′27.5″N 8°56′04″E
- Owner: AMT Genoa
- Tracks: 2

Construction
- Structure type: Overground
- Accessible: Yes

History
- Opened: 2012

Services
Preceding station	Genoa Metro	Following station
De Ferrari towards Brin	Genoa Metro	Terminus
Location

Brignole is a metro station on the line 1 at Genoa that opened in 2012. Connections:Genova Brignole railway station. The architect is Renzo Piano.
