= Brin (Genoa Metro) =

Genoa Metro station

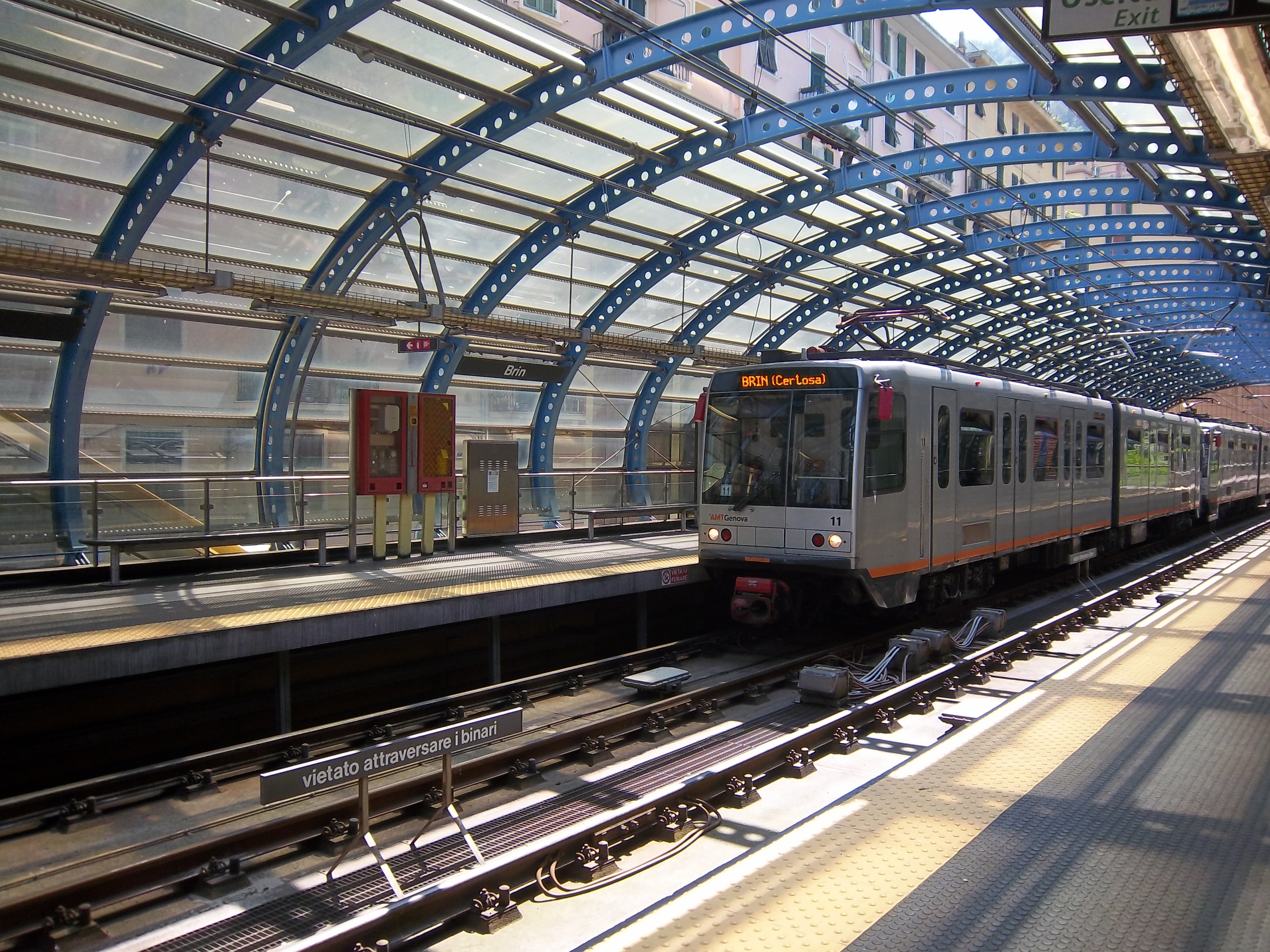

General information
- Location: Via Benedetto Brin, Genoa; Italy
- Coordinates: 44°25′41″N 8°53′44″E
- Owner: AMT Genoa
- Tracks: 2

Construction
- Structure type: Elevated
- Accessible: Yes

History
- Opened: 13 June 1990

Services
Preceding station	Genoa Metro	Following station
Terminus	Genoa Metro	Dinegro towards Brignole
Location

Brin is a Genoa Metro station. It is situated along Via Benedetto Brin in the neighbourhood of Certosa in Rivarolo Ligure, a suburban area in the north-western outskirts of Genoa, Italy. The station, currently the terminus of the line, is located just west of the outlet of the tunnel from Dinegro station. It is built on a viaduct, designed to extend the line to the north, towards a new station. It is the only station above ground.

Designed by architect Renzo Piano, the station's official opening took place on 13 June 1990, and along with Dinegro became one of the first operational stations.
