= Italian submarine Gianfranco Gazzana Priaroggia =

Gianfranco Gazzana Priaroggia was the name of at least two ships of the Italian Navy named in honour of Gianfranco Gazzana-Priaroggia and may refer to:

- Italian submarine Gianfranco Gazzana Priaroggia (S 502), a Tench-class submarine launched in 1948 as the USS Volador. Transferred to Italy and renamed in 1972, she was struck in 1981.
- Italian submarine Gianfranco Gazzana Priaroggia (S 525), a Sauro-class submarine launched in 1993.
