= Italian submarine Guglielmo Marconi =

Guglielmo Marconi was the name of at least two ships of the Italian Navy named in honour of Guglielmo Marconi and may refer to:

- Italian submarine Guglielmo Marconi (1939), a Marconi-class submarine launched in 1939 and sunk in 1941.
- Italian submarine Guglielmo Marconi (S 521), a Sauro-class submarine launched in 1980 and decommissioned in 2003.
