= Italian submarine Salvatore Pelosi =

Sauro-class submarine of the Italian Navy

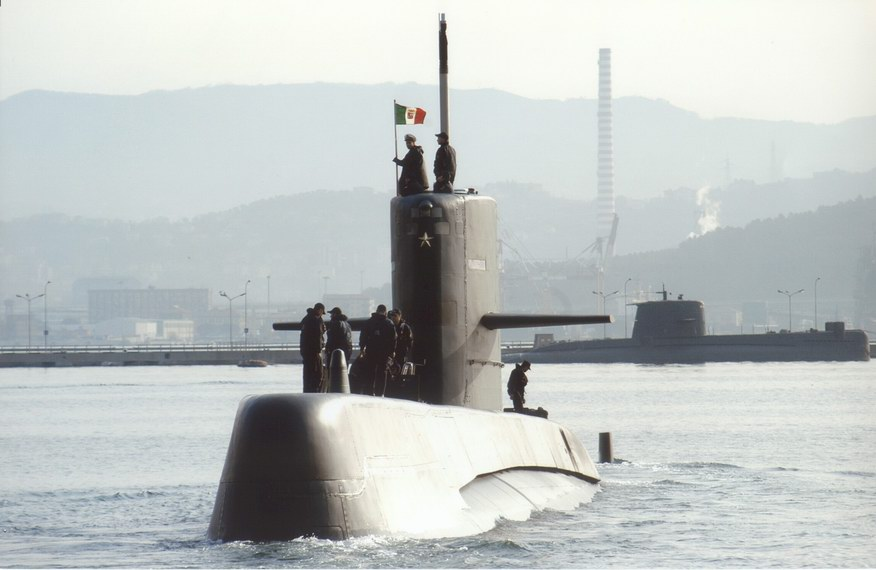
- Guglielmo Marconi

History

Italy
- Name: Salvatore Pelosi
- Namesake: Salvatore Pelosi
- Builder: Fincantieri, Monfalcone
- Laid down: 23 July 1985
- Launched: 29 November 1986
- Commissioned: 14 July 1988
- Home port: La Spezia
- Identification: Pennant number: S 522
- Status: Active

General characteristics
- Class & type: Sauro-class submarine
- Displacement: 1,476 tonnes (surfaced); 1,662 tonnes (submerged)
- Length: 64.36 m (211.2 ft)
- Beam: 6.83 m (22.4 ft)
- Draught: 5.6 m (18.4 ft)
- Depth: 300 m (984.3 ft)
- Propulsion: 3-shaft diesel Grandi Motori Trieste GMT 210.16-NM (2,7 mW); 1 electric engine Magneti Marelli (2.686 kW)
- Speed: 12 knots (22 km/h; 14 mph) (surfaced); 19 knots (35 km/h; 22 mph) (submerged)
- Range: 2,500 nmi (4,600 km; 2,900 mi) at 12 knots (22 km/h; 14 mph)
- Complement: 7 officers; 44 enlisted
- Sensors & processing systems: 1 x radar SMA MM/BPS 704-V2; 1 x sonar STN Atlas Elektronik – ISUS 90-20; Combat System STN Atlas Elektronik – ISUS 90-20; periscopes Kollmorgen; communication system IRSC, by Hagenuk Marinekommunikation; Submarine Action Information System SMA/Datamat MM/SBN-716 SACTIS; periscopes Barr & Stroud CK31 Search and CH81 Attack Periscopes; communication system by ELMER
- Electronic warfare & decoys: ESM systems Elettronica Spa, BLD-727
- Armament: 6 × 533 mm (21 in) torpedo tubes with reloads for: 1.) Black Shark torpedo Mod.3; 2.) Naval mines

Salvatore Pelosi (S 522) is a Sauro-class submarine of the Italian Navy.

== Construction and career ==
Salvatore Pelosi was laid down at Fincantieri Monfalcone Shipyard on 23 July 1985 and launched on 29 November 1986. She was commissioned on 14 July 1988.

She had been homeported in Taranto between 1999 and 2002 and was subjected to radical works that affected the platform and the combat system.

== Gallery ==
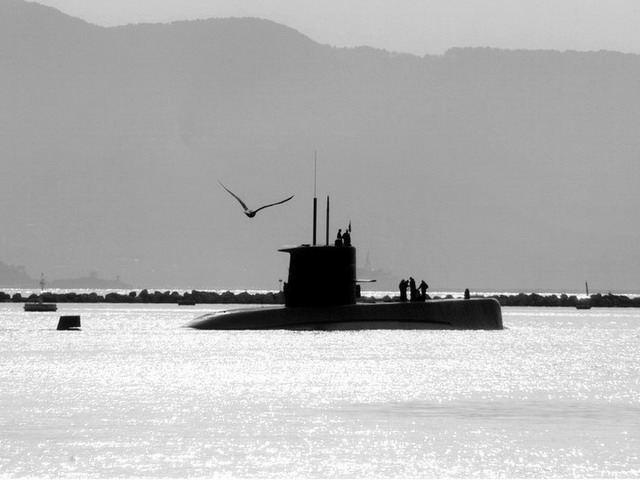
