= Italian submarine Leonardo da Vinci (S 520) =

Sauro-class submarines

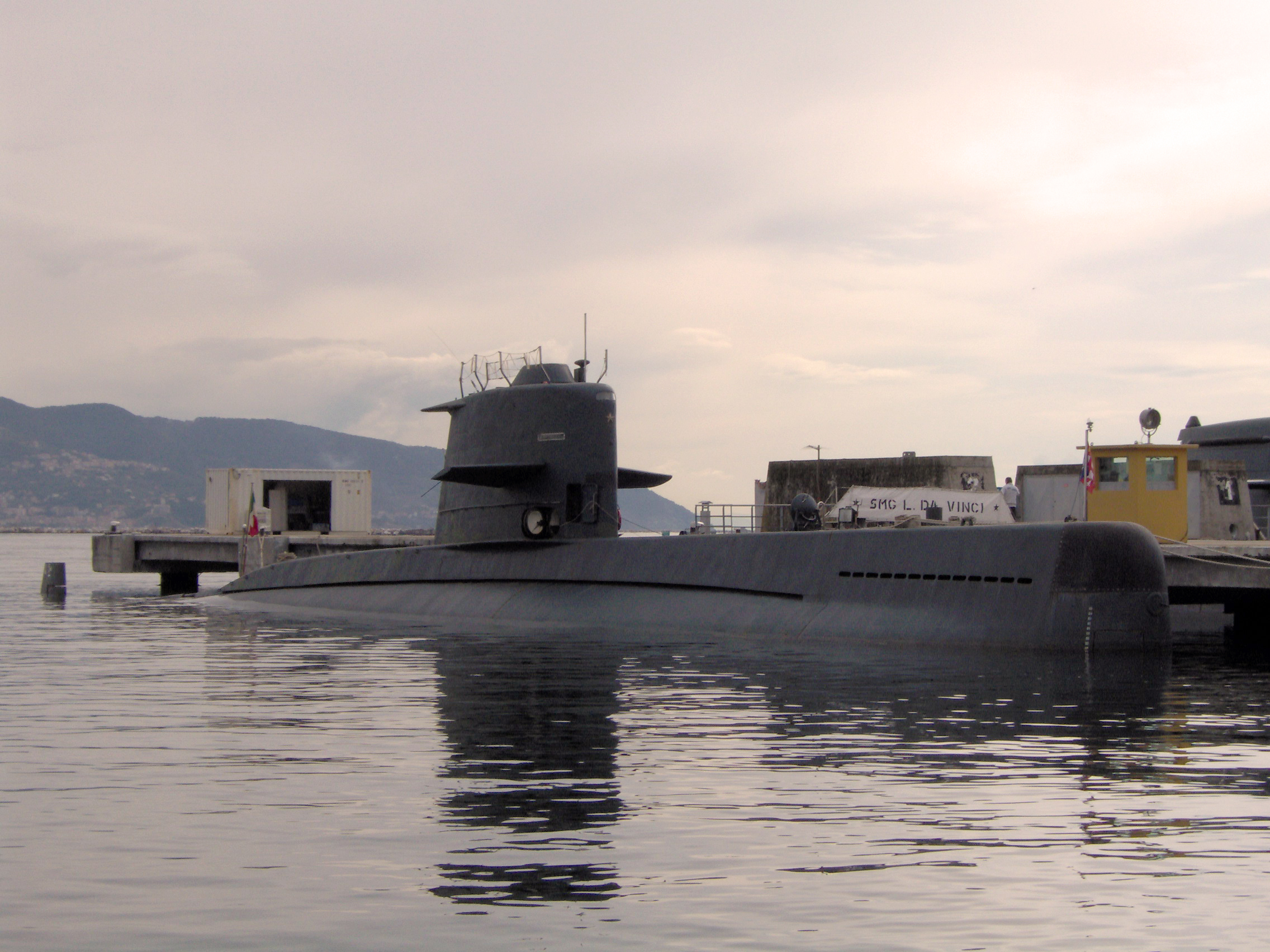
- Leonardo da Vinci on 19 February 2007

History

Italy
- Name: Leonardo da Vinci
- Namesake: Leonardo da Vinci
- Builder: Fincantieri, Monfalcone
- Laid down: 1 July 1976
- Launched: 20 October 1979
- Commissioned: 6 November 1982
- Decommissioned: 30 June 2010
- Home port: La Spezia
- Identification: Pennant number: S 520
- Fate: Scrapped Aliaga Turkey 2024

General characteristics
- Class & type: Sauro-class submarine
- Displacement: 1,456 tonnes (surfaced); 1,641 tonnes (submerged)
- Length: 63.85 m (209.5 ft)
- Beam: 6.83 m (22.4 ft)
- Draught: 5.3 m (17.4 ft)
- Depth: 300 m (984.3 ft)
- Propulsion: 3-shaft diesel Grandi Motori Trieste GMT 210.16-NM (2,7 mW); 1 electric engine Magneti Marelli (2.686 kW)
- Speed: 12 knots (22 km/h; 14 mph) (surfaced); 19 knots (35 km/h; 22 mph) (submerged)
- Range: 2,500 nmi (4,600 km; 2,900 mi) at 12 knots (22 km/h; 14 mph)
- Complement: 7 officers; 44 enlisted
- Sensors & processing systems: 1 x radar SMA SPS-704; 1 x sonar Elsag-USEA IPD70/S; Submarine Action Information System SMA/Datamat MM/SBN-716 SACTIS; periscopes Barr & Stroud CK31 Search and CH81 Attack Periscopes; communication system by ELMER
- Electronic warfare & decoys: ESM systems Elettronica Spa, Thetis ELT/124-s and MM-BLD/1
- Armament: 6 × 533 mm (21 in) torpedo tubes with reloads for: 1.) Black Shark torpedo; 2.) Naval mines

Leonardo da Vinci (S 520) was a Sauro-class submarine of the Italian Navy.

== Construction and career ==
Leonardo da Vinci was laid down at Fincantieri Monfalcone Shipyard on 1 July 1976 and launched on 20 October 1979. She was commissioned on 6 November 1982.

She has participated in important national and international exercises and in 1989, on the occasion of the international exercise Tapon, she was the first post-war Italian-built submarine to cross the Strait of Gibraltar in submersion, under air and naval conflict under the command of the lieutenant captain Luigi de Benedictis, almost half a century after the glorious ancestor of the Regia Marina, a unit that under the command of the Gianfranco Gazzana-Priaroggia had the primacy of the greatest tonnage of enemy ships sunk during the Second World War.

Entered into reserve fleet (RTD) on 31 December 2007.

She was decommissioned on 30 June 2010. She is currently moored at Quay Sauro Calata San Vito, pier 2, north side in the La Spezia Naval Base. Leonardo da Vinci was sold for scrap 2023.

== Gallery ==
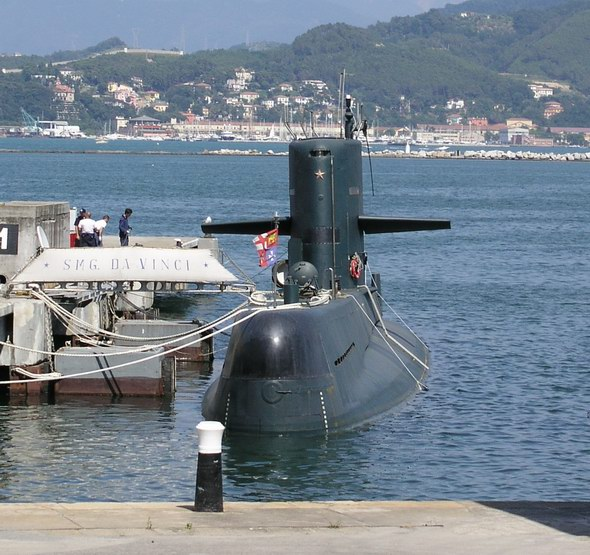

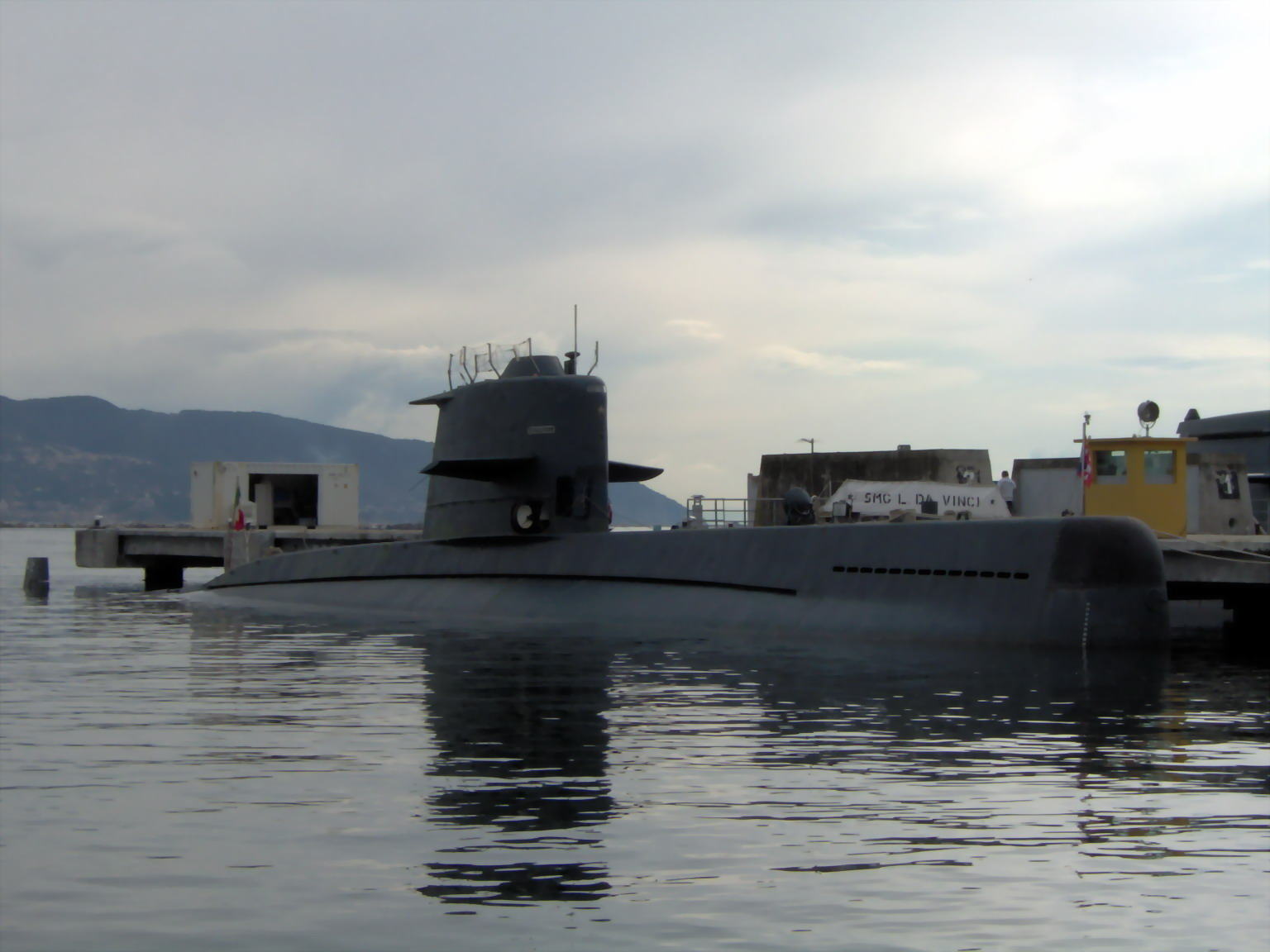

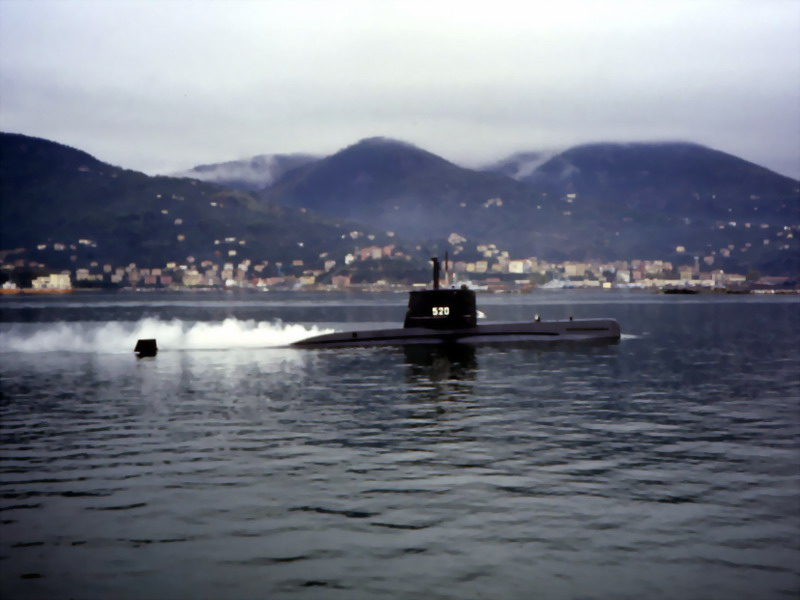

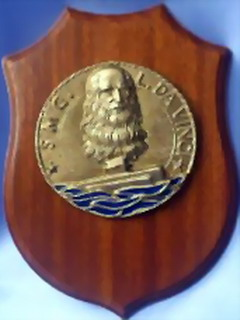
Shield of Leonardo da Vinci
