= Italian submarine Gianfranco Gazzana Priaroggia (S 525) =

Sauro-class submarine

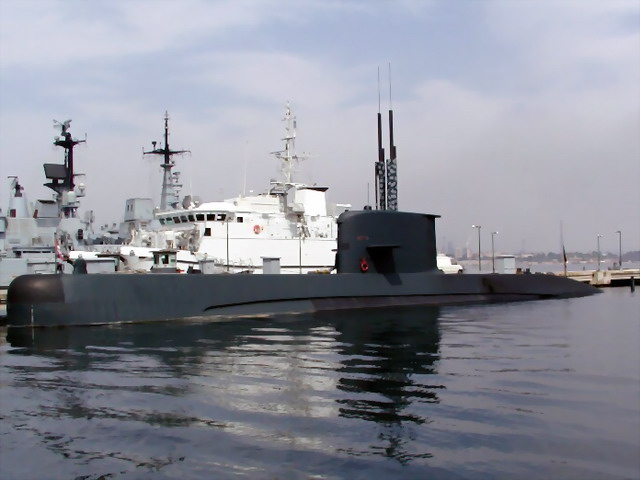
- Gianfranco Gazzana Priaroggia

History

Italy
- Name: Gianfranco Gazzana Priaroggia
- Namesake: Gianfranco Gazzana Priaroggia
- Builder: Fincantieri, Monfalcone
- Laid down: 12 November 1992
- Launched: 26 June 1993
- Commissioned: 12 June 1995
- Home port: Taranto
- Identification: Pennant number: S 525
- Status: Active

General characteristics
- Class & type: Sauro-class submarine
- Displacement: 1,653 tonnes (surfaced); 1,862 tonnes (submerged)
- Length: 66 m (216.5 ft)
- Beam: 6.83 m (22.4 ft)
- Draught: 6.3 m (20.7 ft)
- Depth: 300 m (984.3 ft)
- Propulsion: 3-shaft diesel Grandi Motori Trieste GMT 210.16-NM (2,7 mW); 1 electric engine ABB
- Speed: 12 knots (22 km/h; 14 mph) (surfaced); 19 knots (35 km/h; 22 mph) (submerged)
- Range: 2,500 nmi (4,600 km; 2,900 mi) at 12 knots (22 km/h; 14 mph)
- Complement: 7 officers; 44 enlisted
- Sensors & processing systems: 1 x radar SMA MM/BPS 704-V2; 1 x sonar STN Atlas Elektronik – ISUS 90-20; Combat System STN Atlas Elektronik – ISUS 90-20; periscopes Kollmorgen; communication system IRSC, by Hagenuk Marinekommunikation; Submarine Action Information System SMA/Datamat MM/SBN-716 SACTIS; periscopes Barr & Stroud CK31 Search and CH81 Attack Periscopes; communication system by ELMER
- Electronic warfare & decoys: ESM systems Elettronica Spa, BLD-727
- Armament: 6 × 533 mm (21 in) torpedo tubes with reloads for: 1.) Black Shark torpedo Mod.3; 2.) Naval mines

Gianfranco Gazzana Priaroggia (S 525) is a Sauro-class submarine of the Italian Navy.

== Construction and career ==
Gianfranco Gazzana Priaroggia was laid down at Fincantieri Monfalcone Shipyard on 12 November 1992 and launched on 26 June 1993. It was commissioned on 12 June 1995.

It is in service in the First Submarine Group based in the naval base of Taranto. The submarine, which was intensively used in training activities, between 1999 and 2002 was subjected to radical works involving the platform and the combat system.

== Gallery ==
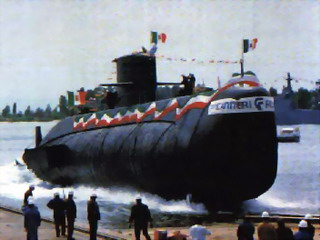
Gianfranco Gazzana Priaroggia being launched on 26 June 1993

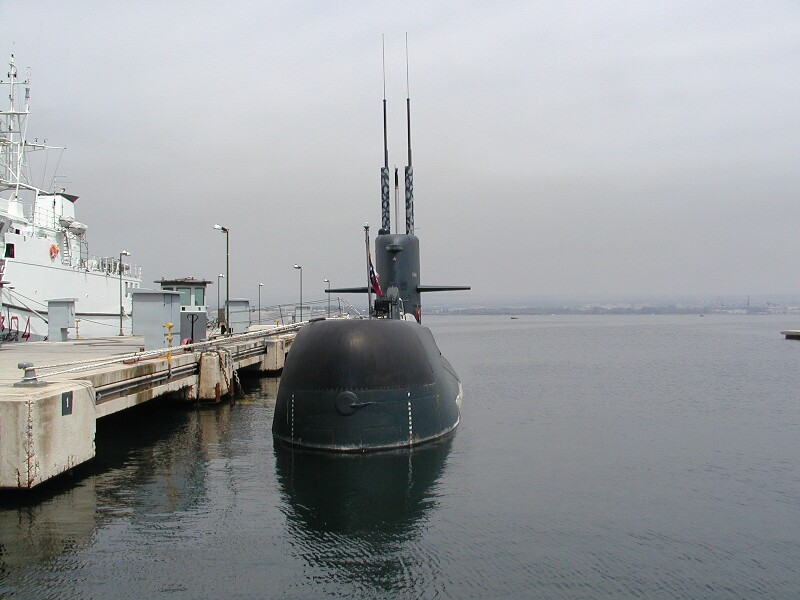

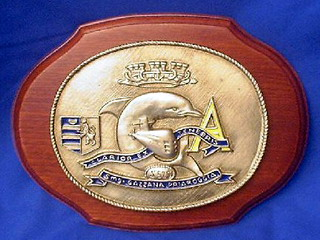
Crest of Gianfranco Gazzana Priaroggia
