= Italian submarine Nazario Sauro =

Sauro-class submarine

Coordinates: 44.4135136°N 8.9239659°E

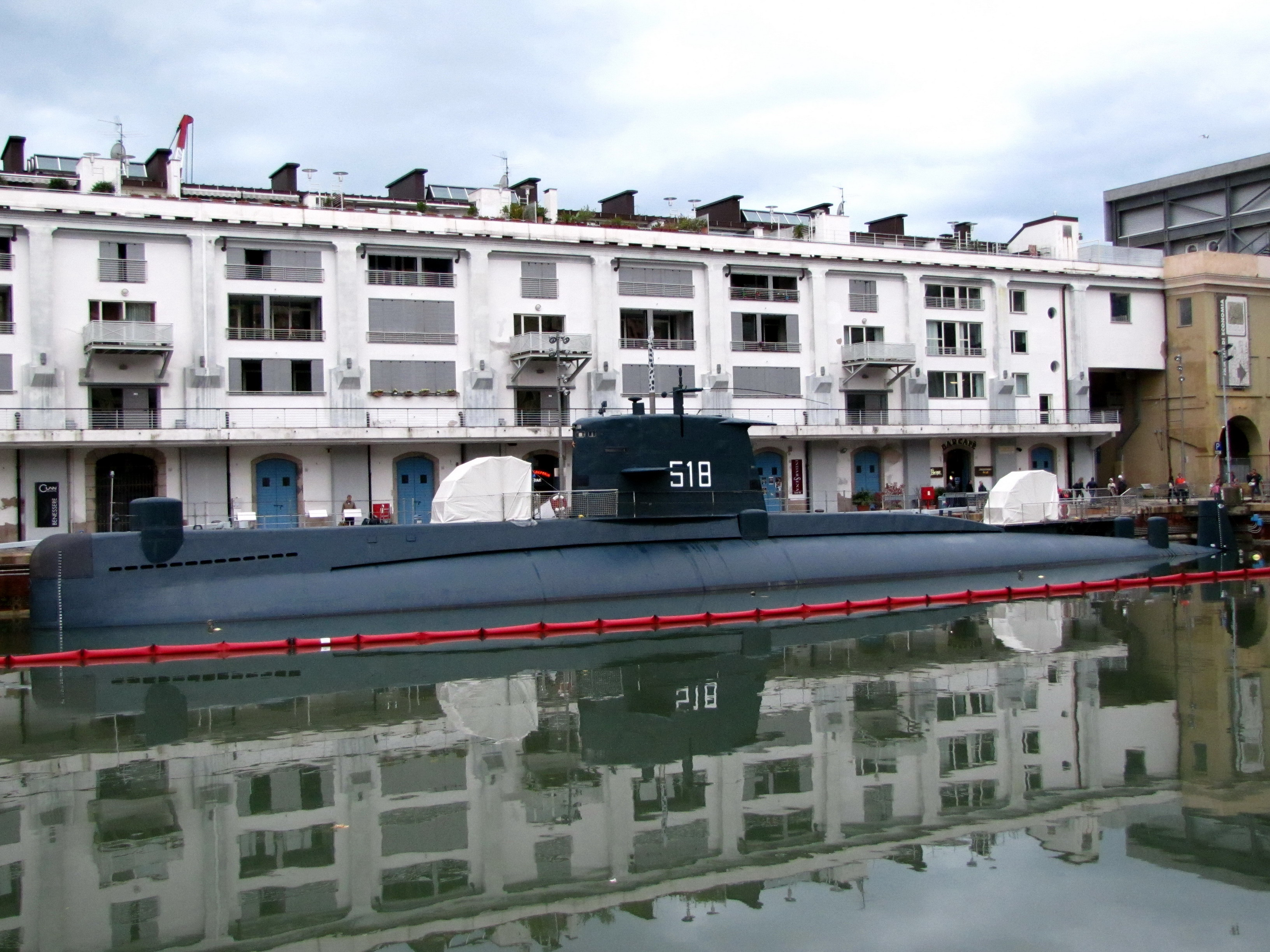
- Nazario Sauro on 31 October 2010

History

Italy
- Name: Nazario Sauro
- Namesake: Nazario Sauro
- Builder: Fincantieri, Monfalcone
- Laid down: 26 June 1974
- Launched: 9 October 1976
- Commissioned: 1 March 1980
- Decommissioned: 30 April 2002
- Home port: La Spezia
- Identification: Pennant number: S 518; Callsign: IANS
- Status: Museum ship at Galata Marine Museum, Italy since 18 September 2009.

General characteristics
- Class & type: Sauro-class submarine
- Displacement: 1,456 tonnes (surfaced); 1,641 tonnes (submerged)
- Length: 63.85 m (209.5 ft)
- Beam: 6.83 m (22.4 ft)
- Draught: 5.3 m (17.4 ft)
- Depth: 300 m (984.3 ft)
- Propulsion: 3-shaft diesel Grandi Motori Trieste GMT 210.16-NM (2,7 MW); 1 electric engine Magneti Marelli (2.686 kW)
- Speed: 12 knots (22 km/h; 14 mph) (surfaced); 19 knots (35 km/h; 22 mph) (submerged)
- Range: 2,500 nmi (4,600 km; 2,900 mi) at 12 knots (22 km/h; 14 mph)
- Complement: 7 officers; 44 enlisted
- Sensors & processing systems: 1 x radar SMA SPS-704; 1 x sonar Elsag-USEA IPD70/S; Submarine Action Information System SMA/Datamat MM/SBN-716 SACTIS; periscopes Barr & Stroud CK31 Search and CH81 Attack Periscopes; communication system by ELMER
- Electronic warfare & decoys: ESM systems Elettronica Spa, Thetis ELT/124-s and MM-BLD/1
- Armament: 6 × 533 mm (21 in) torpedo tubes with reloads for: 1.) Black Shark torpedo; 2.) Naval mines

Nazario Sauro (S 518) was the lead boat of the Sauro-class submarines of the Italian Navy.

== Construction and career ==
Nazario Sauro was laid down at Fincantieri Monfalcone Shipyard on 26 June 1974 and launched on 9 October 1976. She was commissioned on 1 March 1980.

She was decommissioned on 30 April 2002. The submarine's disarmament started on 1 May 2002 as she was moored at the Arsenal of La Spezia together with the sister submarine Carlo Fecia di Cossato, where she has been, since 2008, the subject of a restoration work for the transformation into a museum was implemented on behalf of the Institution of the Sea and Navigation Museums of Genoa, by the Fincantieri company, the same company that had built her in the late 1970s (then Italcantieri).

At dawn on 18 September 2009 the Nazario Sauro left the La Spezia for her last voyage. Towed by tugs, she reached the ancient port of Genoa where on 26 September she was moored in the Port of Genoa in front of the Galata Museum of the sea.

The museum exhibition, designed and directed by the architect Roberto Bajano for the Galata - Sea Museum in collaboration with the Submarine Project Office of the Military Ships Directorate of Fincantieri, makes her the first museum ship in Italy visible in the water.

The opening to the public took place on 29 May 2010.

== Gallery ==
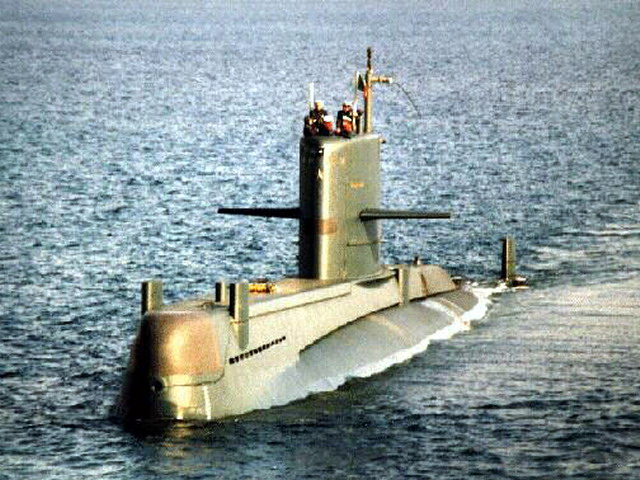
Nazario Sauro in active service

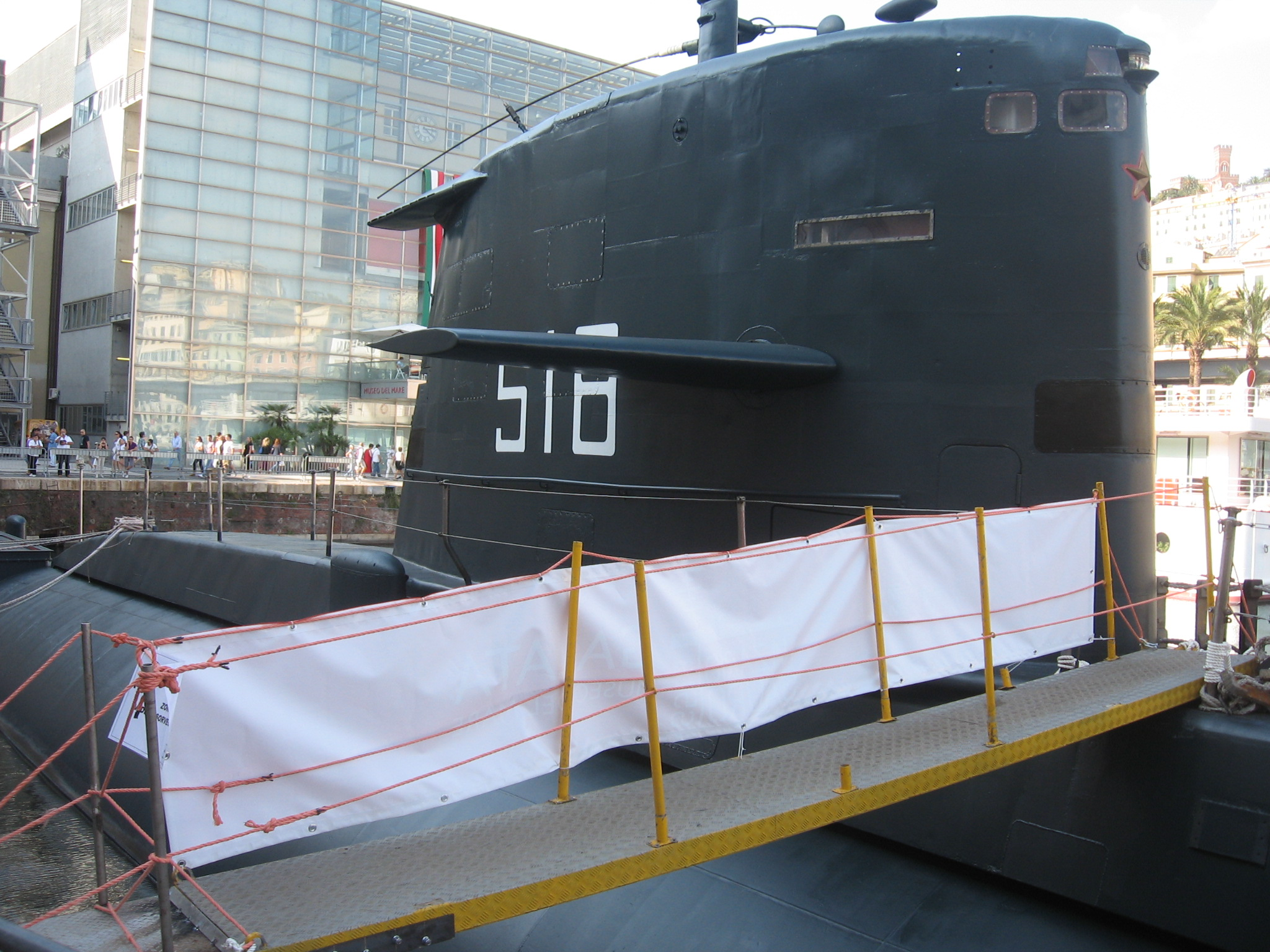
Nazario Sauro as a museum ship

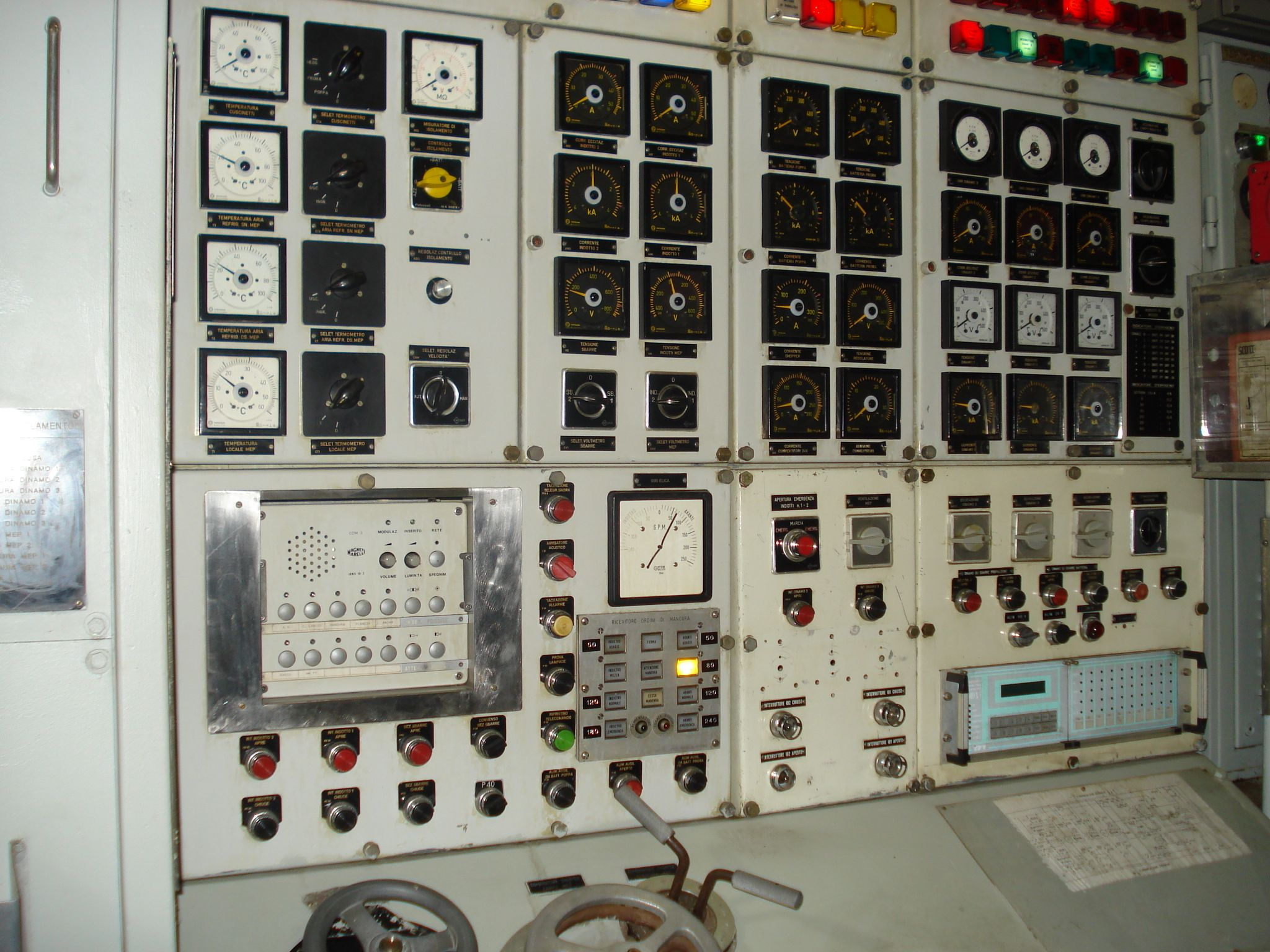

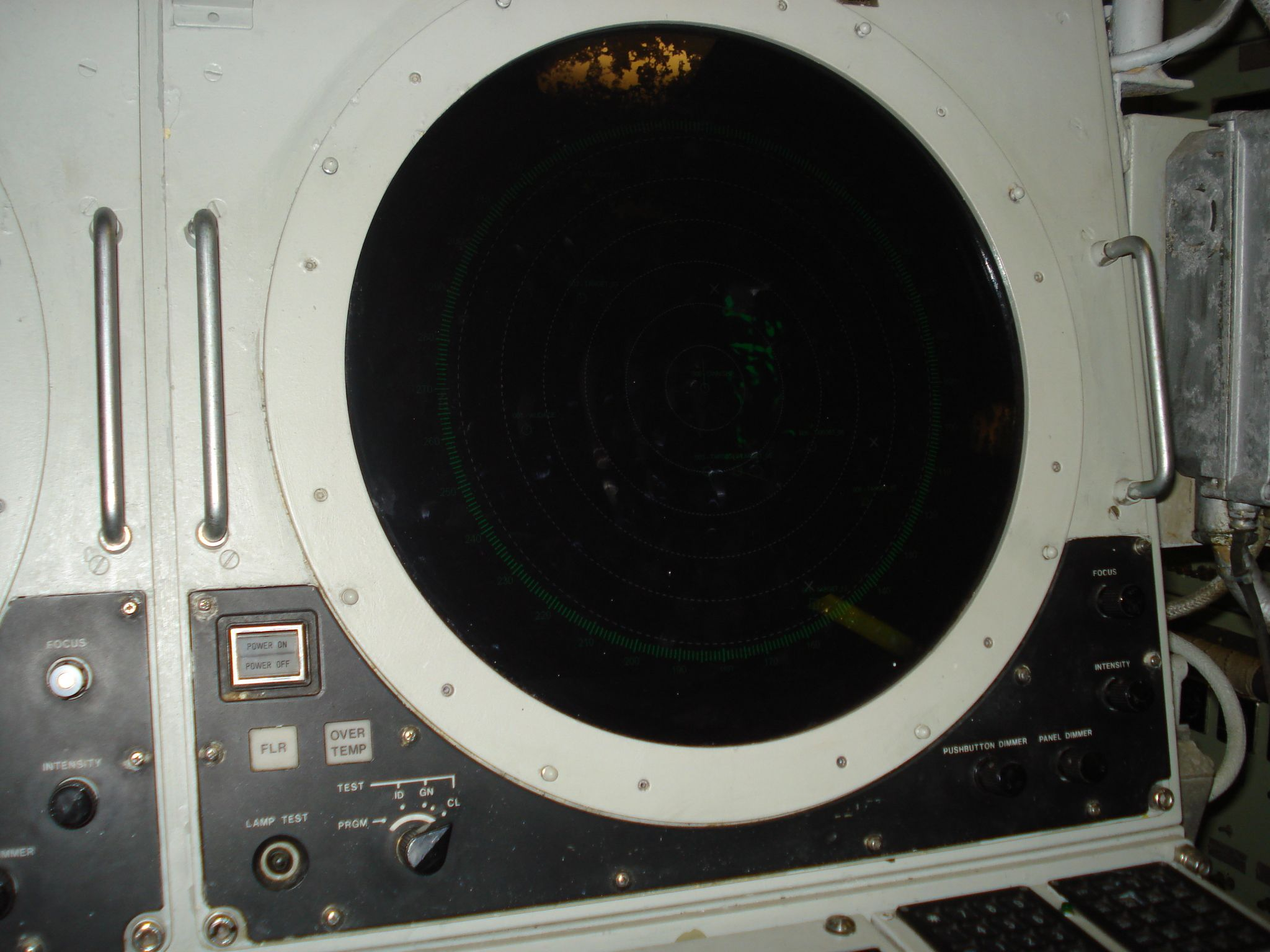

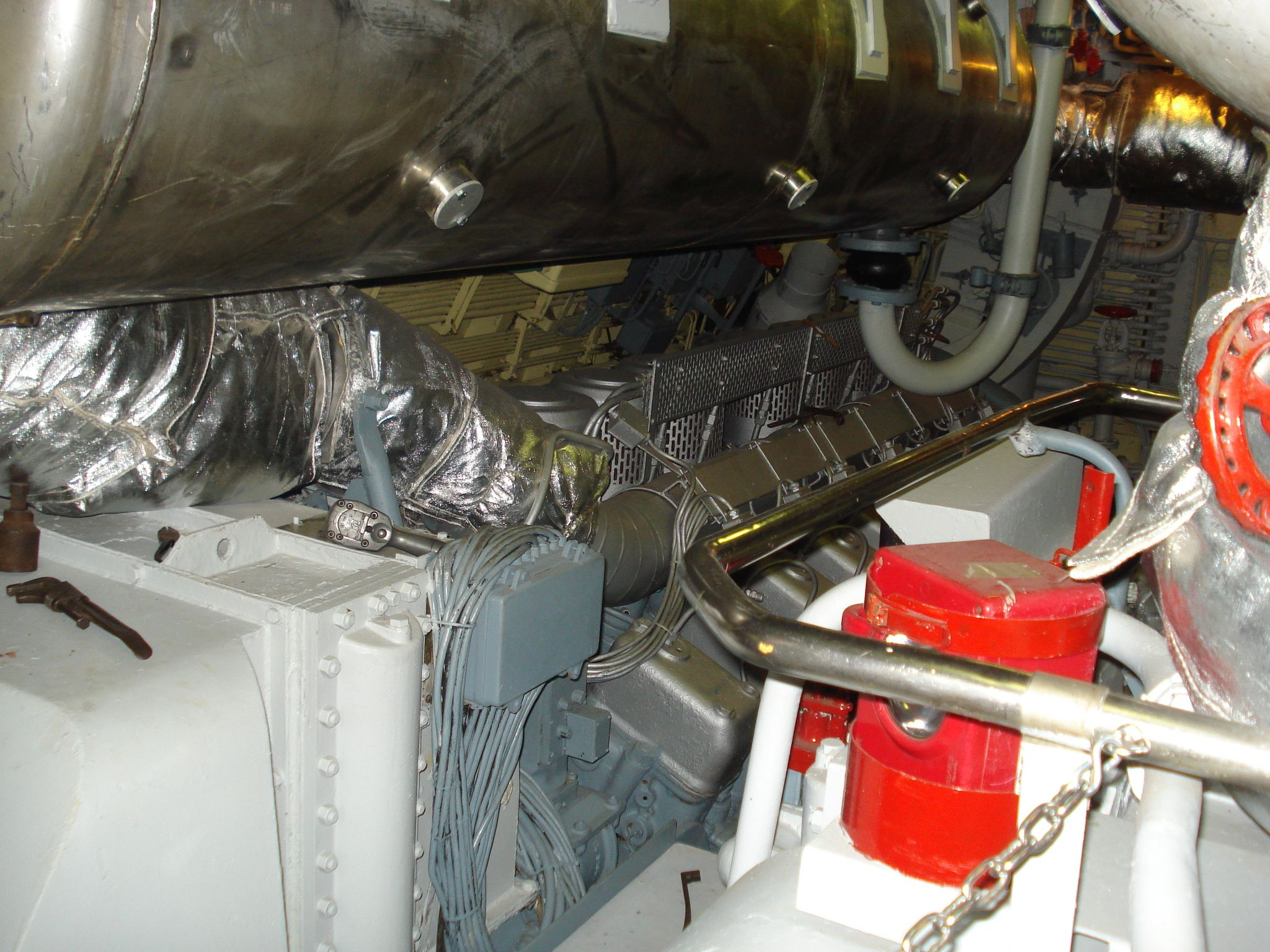

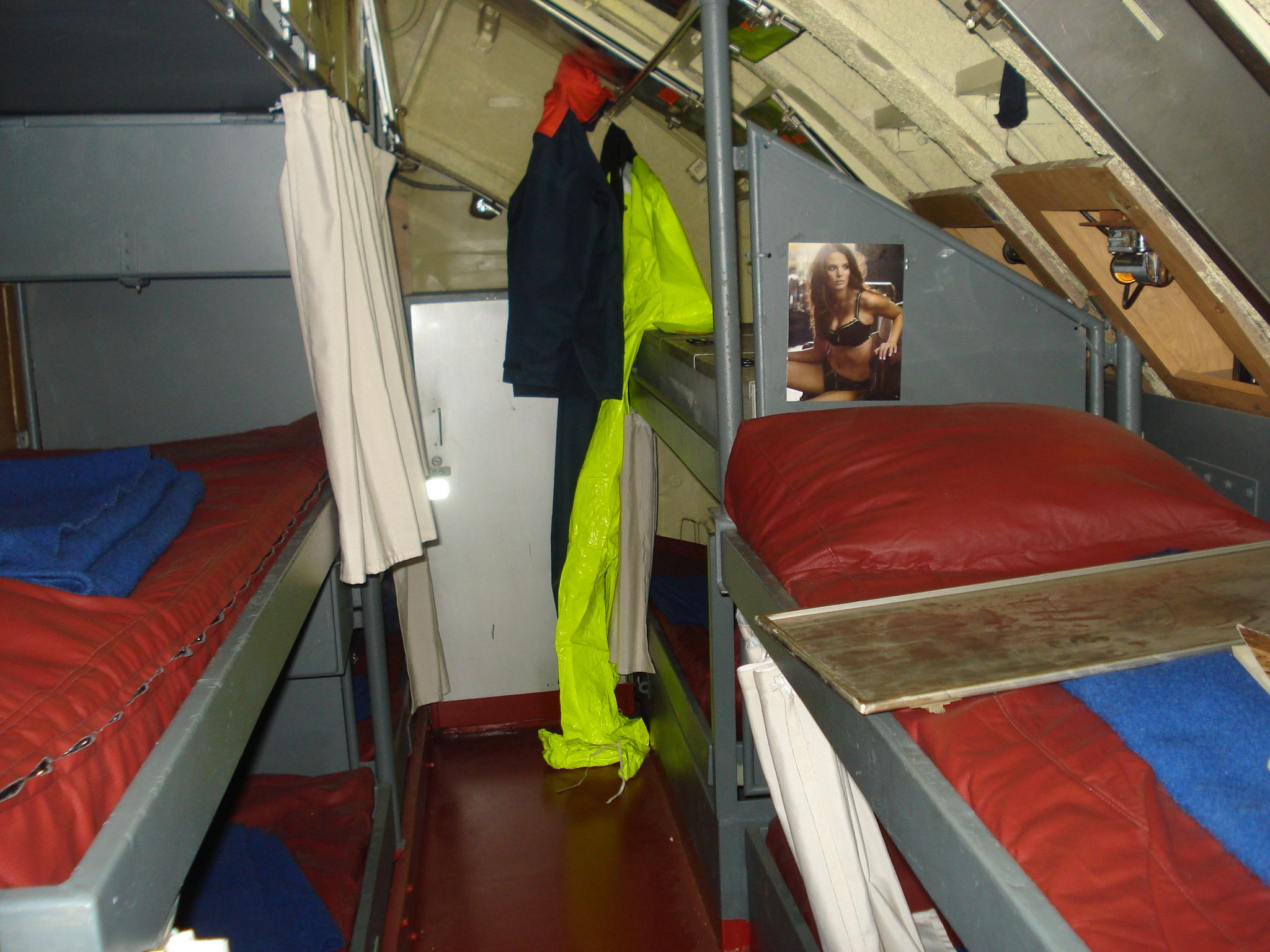

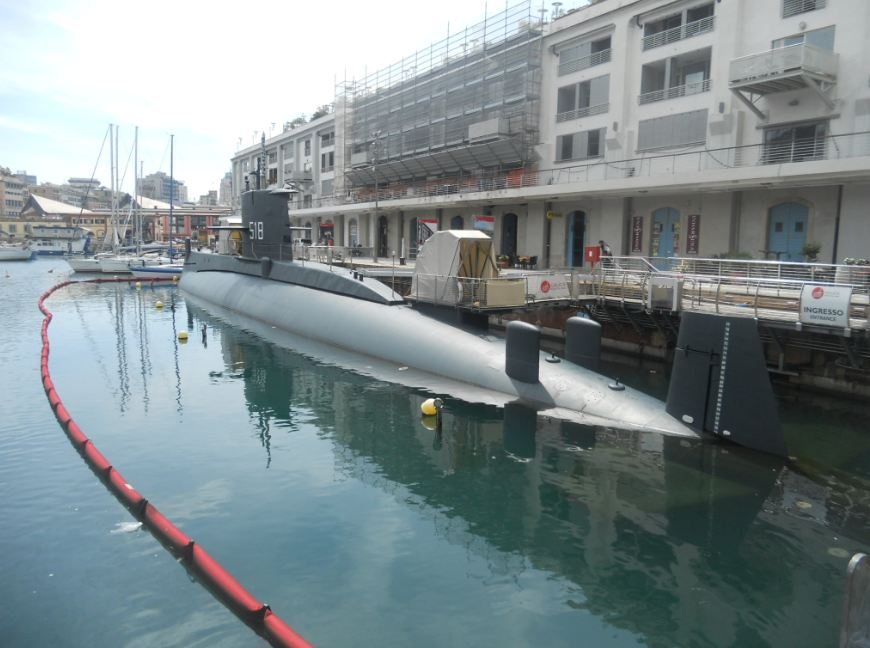

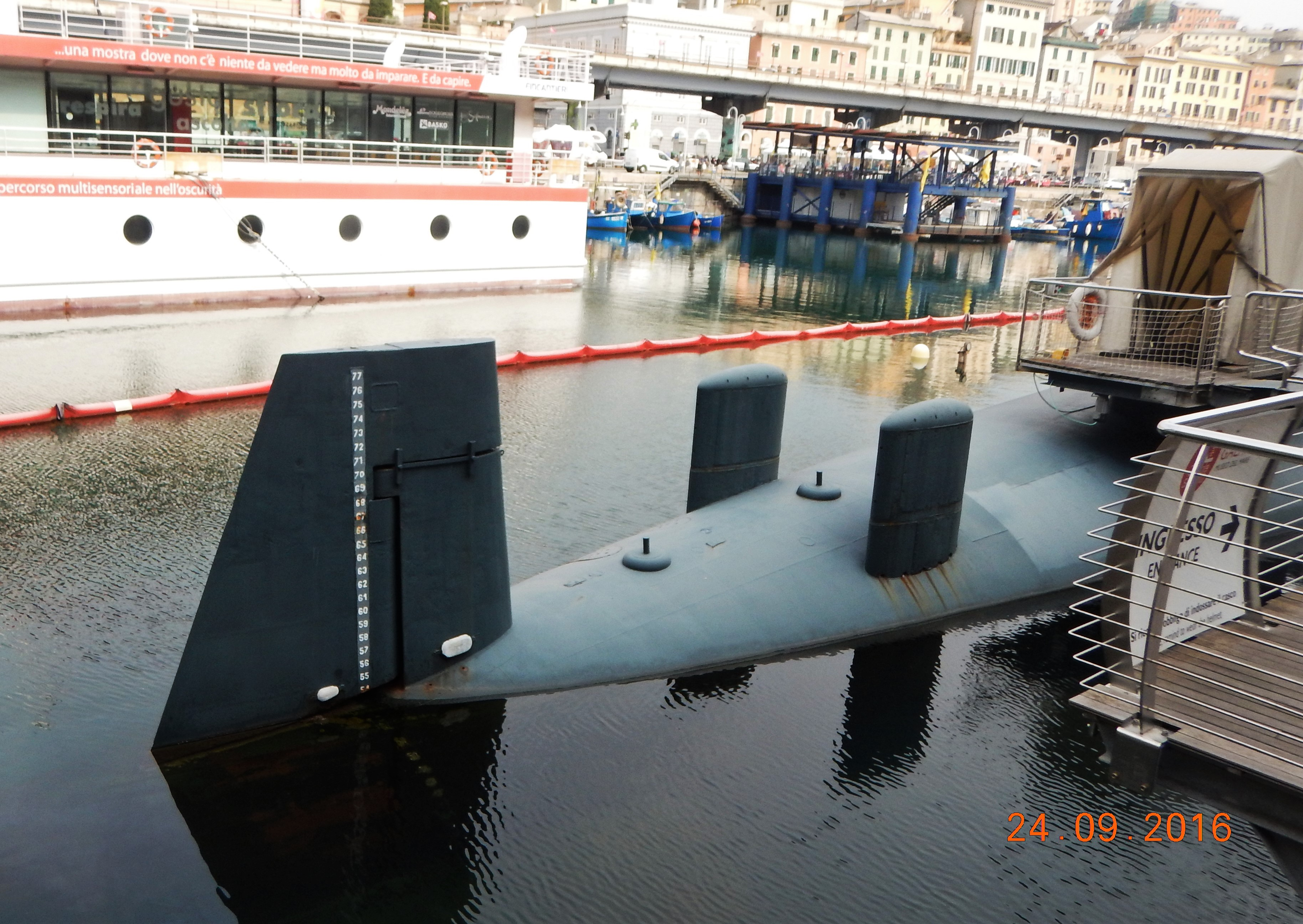

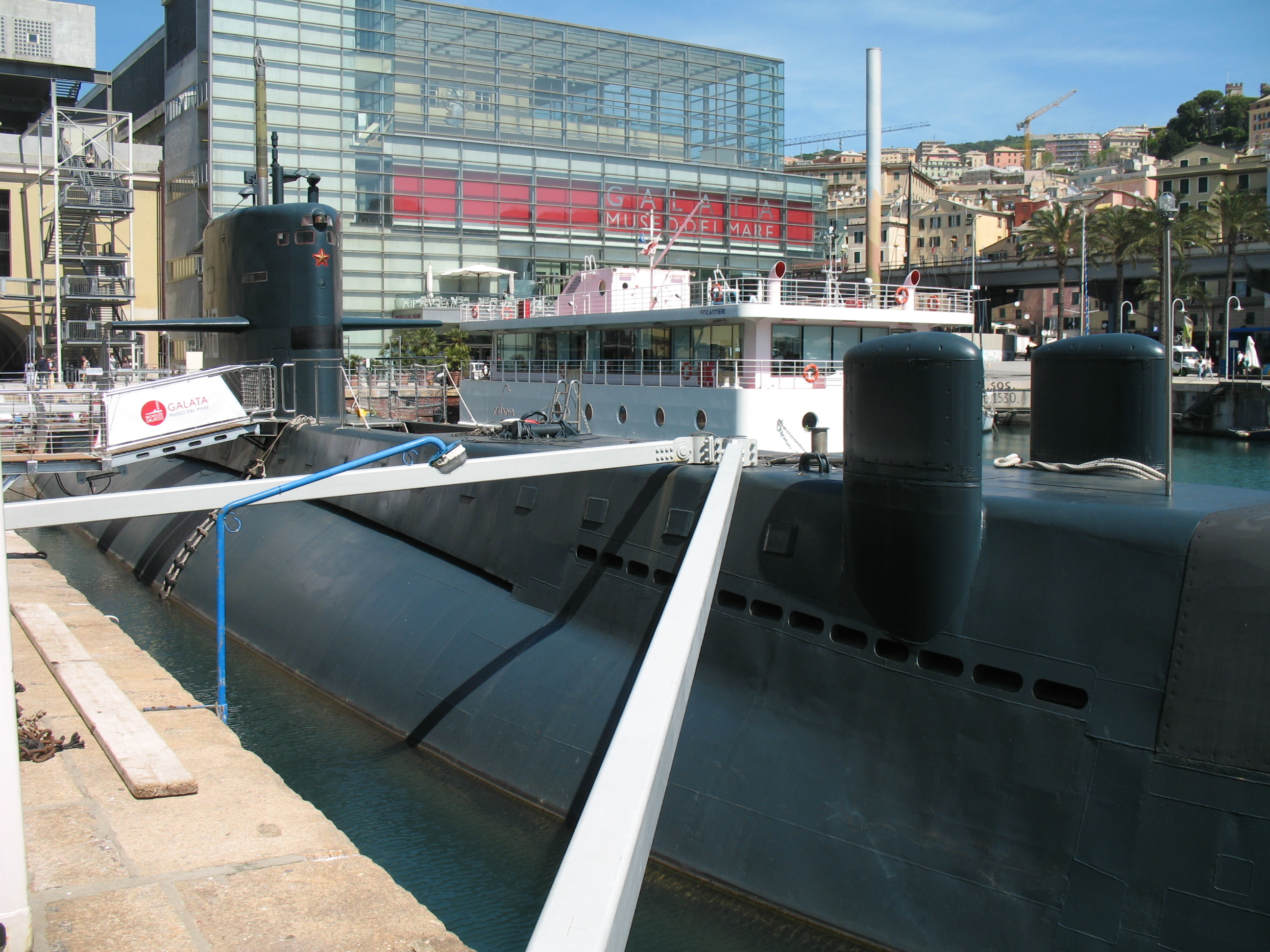

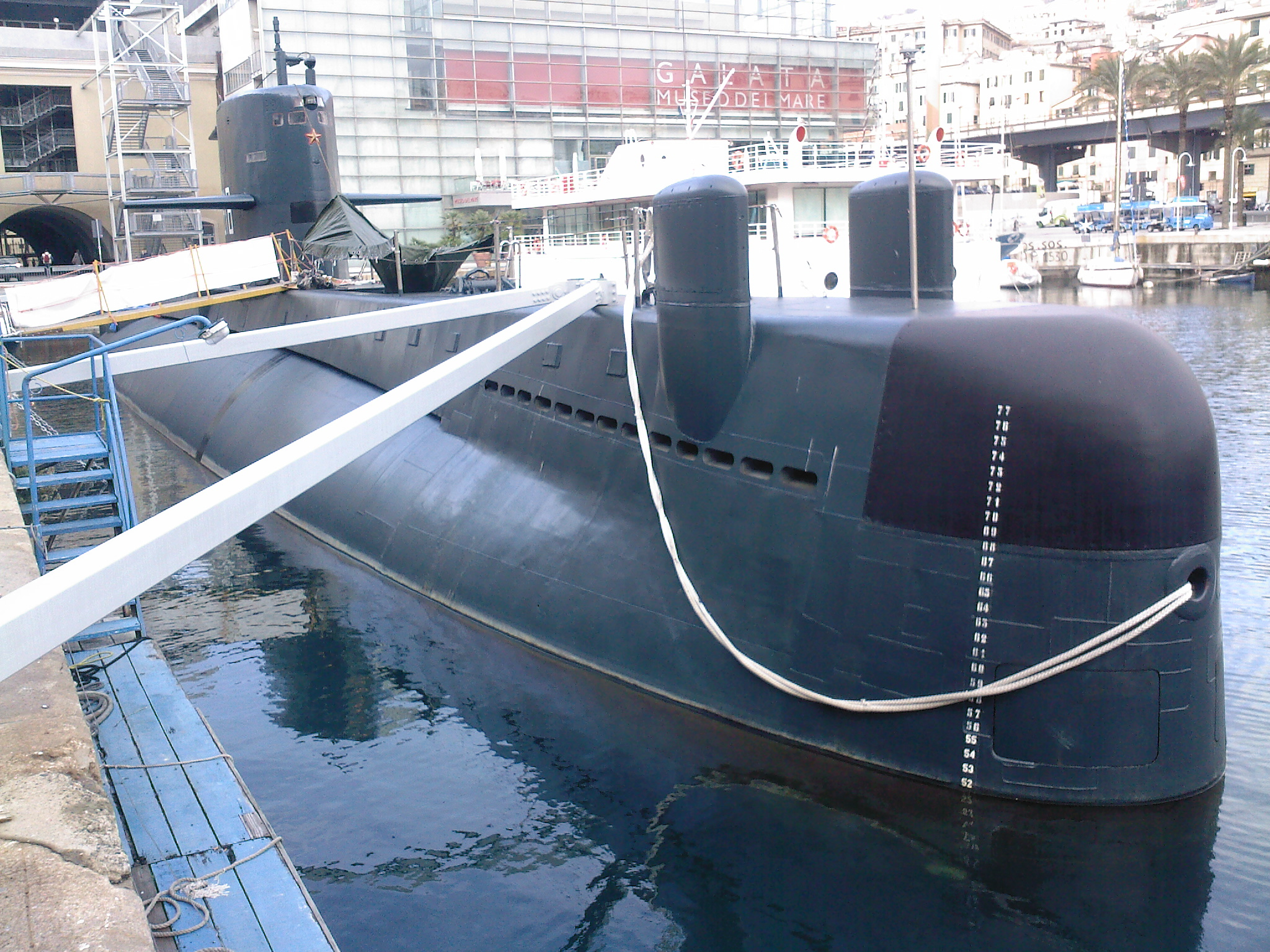

== See also ==
- Enrico Toti (S 506)
