= Montella =

- Comune
- Comune di Montella
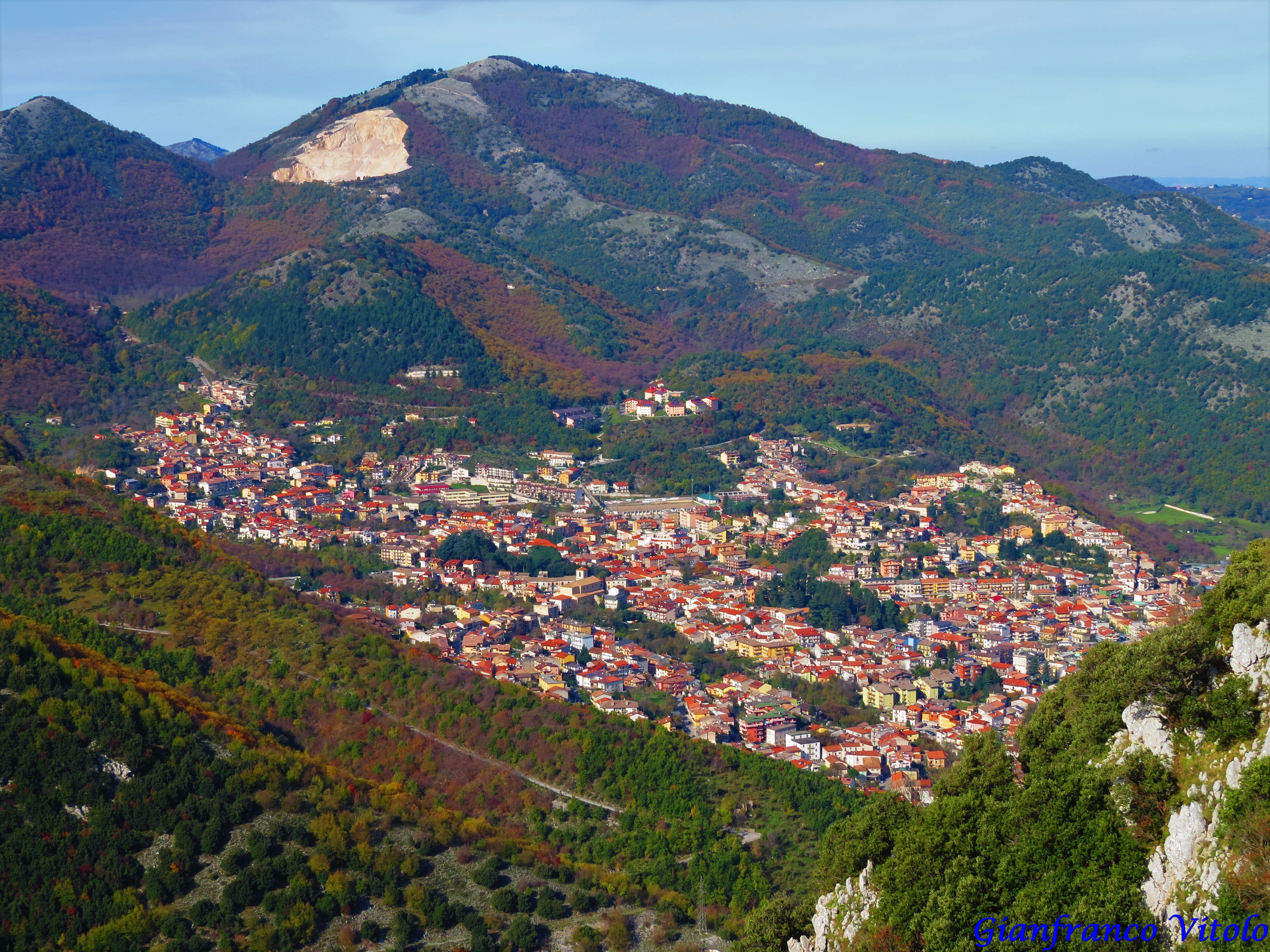
- Montella from above

- Coat of arms

- Location within Italy Location within Campania
- Coordinates: 40°51′N 15°1′E
- Country: Italy
- Region: Campania
- Province: Avellino (AV)

Government
  - Mayor: Rizieri Buonopane

Area
  - Total: 83.32 km^{2} (32.17 sq mi)
- Elevation: 546 m (1,791 ft)

Population (30 November 2017)
  - Total: 7,699
  - Density: 92.40/km^{2} (239.3/sq mi)
- Demonym: Montellese
- Time zone: UTC+1 (CET)
  - Summer (DST): UTC+2 (CEST)
- Postal code: 83048
- Dialing code: 0827
- Patron saint: St. Roch
- Saint day: 16 August
- Website: Official website

Montella (Neapolitan: Monteddra) is an Italian town and comune (municipality) in the province of Avellino, Campania, with a population of 7,699. The zone was inhabited already in the Neolithic period. The town was founded by the Samnites in the 1st millennium BC, to become a municipality of the Roman Empire and a town under the Lombards.

== Culture ==
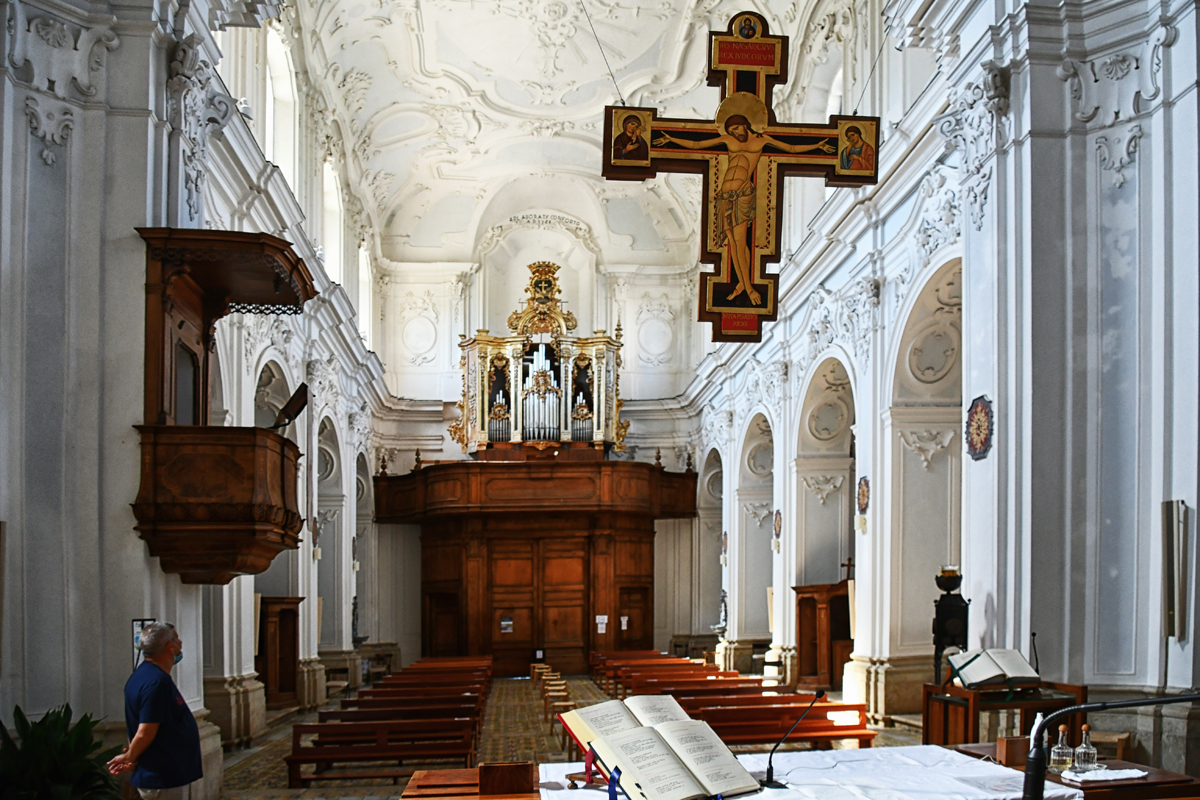
Convento di San Francesco.

Montella is a production center of chestnuts, and the comune organizes the Sagra Castagna di Montella (Montella Chestnut Festival) each fall. An eco-museum dedicated to the chestnut, the Museo della Castagna Montella, opened in 2014.

Part of the comune of Montella is also encompassed by Monti Picentini Regional Park, a mountainous natural preserve in Campania which is host to many types of mushrooms as well as cave systems.

The Convent of Saint Francis at Folloni is nearby. According to tradition, it was founded by Saint Francis of Assisi in AD 1221-1222 when he was turned away from the town due to fears of leprosy. The saint and his fellow travelers slept under a tree and were miraculously protected from the snow. After this event, they founded the friary and it remains there today.

== Twin towns ==
- (United States) Norristown, Pennsylvania, USA

== People ==
- Giovanni Palatucci, a Righteous Among the Nations
- Salvatore Pelosi, Italian naval officer
- Aurelio Fierro, Italian singer
- Geno Auriemma, American basketball coach
- Leonarda Cianciulli, serial killer

The grandparents of American actress Maria Bello came from Montella.

== See also ==
- Laceno
- Terminio
- Picentini
