= Italian submarine Giuliano Prini =

Sauro-class submarine

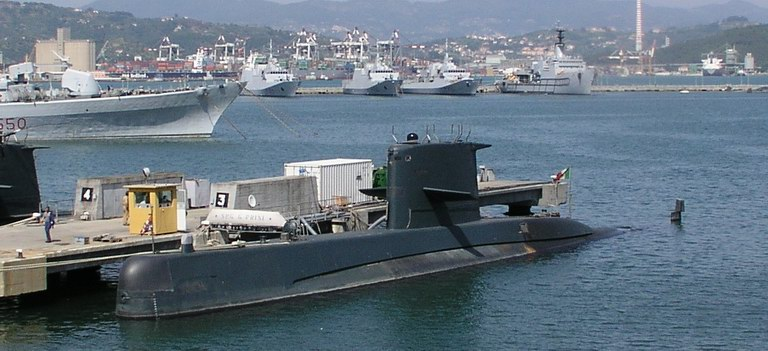
- Giuliano Prini

History

Italy
- Name: Giuliano Prini
- Namesake: Giuliano Prini
- Builder: Fincantieri, Monfalcone
- Laid down: 30 July 1987
- Launched: 12 December 1987
- Commissioned: 17 May 1989
- Home port: La Spezia
- Identification: Pennant number: S 523
- Status: Active

General characteristics
- Class & type: Sauro-class submarine
- Displacement: 1,476 tonnes (surfaced); 1,662 tonnes (submerged)
- Length: 64.36 m (211.2 ft)
- Beam: 6.83 m (22.4 ft)
- Draught: 5.6 m (18.4 ft)
- Depth: 300 m (984.3 ft)
- Propulsion: 3-shaft diesel Grandi Motori Trieste GMT 210.16-NM (2,7 mW); 1 electric engine Magneti Marelli (2.686 kW)
- Speed: 12 knots (22 km/h; 14 mph) (surfaced); 19 knots (35 km/h; 22 mph) (submerged)
- Range: 2,500 nmi (4,600 km; 2,900 mi) at 12 knots (22 km/h; 14 mph)
- Complement: 7 officers; 44 enlisted
- Sensors & processing systems: 1 x radar SMA MM/BPS 704-V2; 1 x sonar STN Atlas Elektronik – ISUS 90-20; Combat System STN Atlas Elektronik – ISUS 90-20; periscopes Kollmorgen; communication system IRSC, by Hagenuk Marinekommunikation; Submarine Action Information System SMA/Datamat MM/SBN-716 SACTIS; periscopes Barr & Stroud CK31 Search and CH81 Attack Periscopes; communication system by ELMER
- Electronic warfare & decoys: ESM systems Elettronica Spa, BLD-727
- Armament: 6 × 533 mm (21 in) torpedo tubes with reloads for: 1.) Black Shark torpedo Mod.3; 2.) Naval mines

Giuliano Prini (S 523) is a Sauro-class submarine of the Italian Navy.

== Construction and career ==
Giuliano Prini was laid down at Fincantieri Monfalcone Shipyard on 30 July 1987 and launched on 12 December 1987. She was commissioned on 17 May 1989.

She had been homeported in Taranto between 1999 and 2004 and was subjected to radical works that affected the platform and the combat system.

== Gallery ==
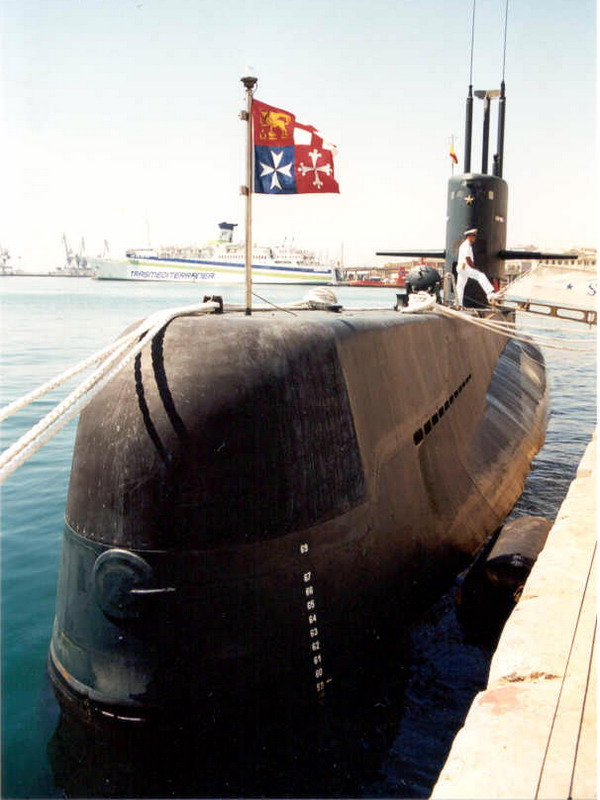

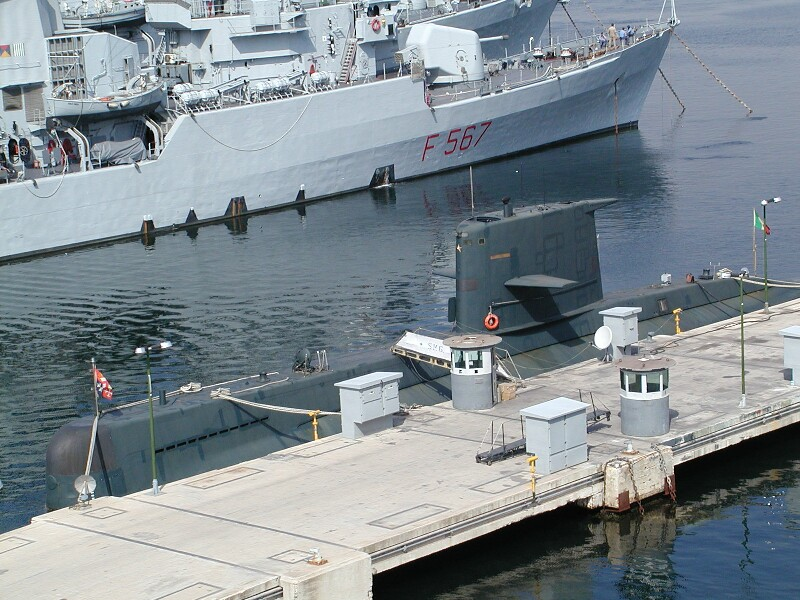
