= Italian submarine Carlo Fecia di Cossato =

Sauro-class submarine

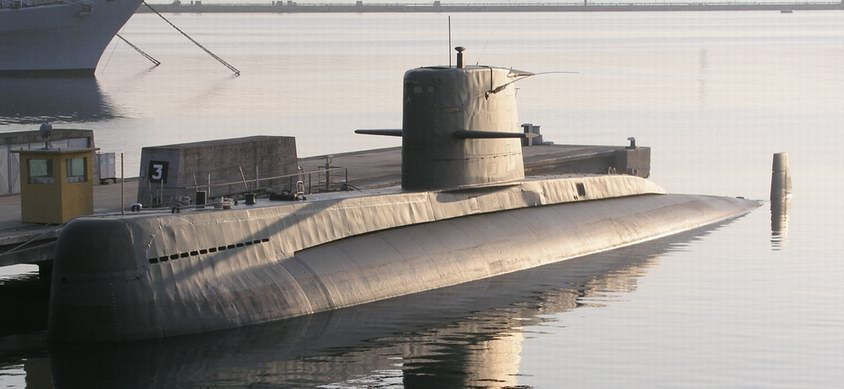
- Carlo Fecia di Cossato

History

Italy
- Name: Carlo Fecia di Cossato
- Namesake: Carlo Fecia di Cossato
- Builder: Fincantieri, Monfalcone
- Laid down: 15 November 1975
- Launched: 16 November 1977
- Commissioned: 5 November 1979
- Decommissioned: 1 April 2005
- Home port: La Spezia
- Identification: Pennant number: S 519
- Fate: Scrapped Aliaga Turkey 2024

General characteristics
- Class & type: Sauro-class submarine
- Displacement: 1,456 tonnes (surfaced); 1,641 tonnes (submerged)
- Length: 63.85 m (209.5 ft)
- Beam: 6.83 m (22.4 ft)
- Draught: 5.3 m (17.4 ft)
- Depth: 300 m (984.3 ft)
- Propulsion: 3-shaft diesel Grandi Motori Trieste GMT 210.16-NM (2,7 mW); 1 electric engine Magneti Marelli (2.686 kW)
- Speed: 12 knots (22 km/h; 14 mph) (surfaced); 19 knots (35 km/h; 22 mph) (submerged)
- Range: 2,500 nmi (4,600 km; 2,900 mi) at 12 knots (22 km/h; 14 mph)
- Complement: 7 officers; 44 enlisted
- Sensors & processing systems: 1 x radar SMA SPS-704; 1 x sonar Elsag-USEA IPD70/S; Submarine Action Information System SMA/Datamat MM/SBN-716 SACTIS; periscopes Barr & Stroud CK31 Search and CH81 Attack Periscopes; communication system by ELMER
- Electronic warfare & decoys: ESM systems Elettronica Spa, Thetis ELT/124-s and MM-BLD/1
- Armament: 6 × 533 mm (21 in) torpedo tubes with reloads for: 1.) Black Shark torpedo; 2.) Naval mines

Carlo Fecia di Cossato (S 519) was a Sauro-class submarine of the Italian Navy.

== Construction and career ==
Carlo Fecia di Cossato was laid down at Fincantieri Monfalcone Shipyard on 15 November 1975 and launched on 16 November 1977. She was commissioned on 5 November 1979.

She was decommissioned on 30 April 2002. From 1 April 2005, she began disarmament while moored at La Spezia and she is expected to undergo restoration where she will be transferred to Trieste serve as a museum ship in their old port. The sister submarine, Nazario Sauro was destined for a similar role and was transferred on 18 September 2009 to be exhibited at the Galata - Museum of the sea in Genoa as an integral part of the museum. Carlo Fecia di Cossato was sold for scrap 2023.
