= Galata – Museo del mare =

Maritime museum in Genoa, Italy

Galata - Museo del mare
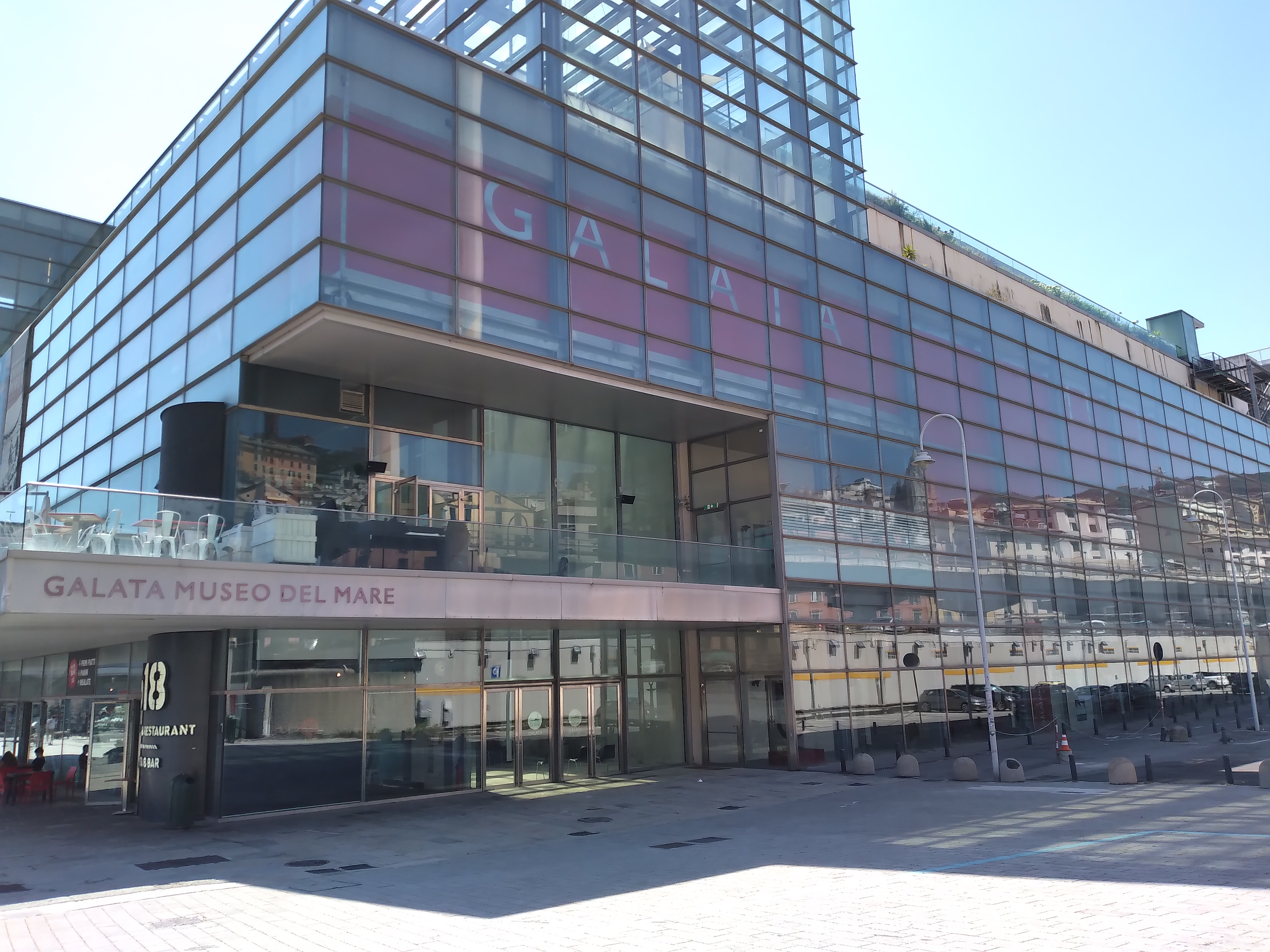
- Galata Museo del mare, 2021
- Established: 2004
- Location: Genoa, Italy
- Coordinates: 44°24′51″N 8°55′24″E
- Type: Science museum; history museum
- Collections: Naval collections
- Architect: Guillermo Vázquez Consuegra
- Owner: Costa Edutainment S.p.A.
- Public transit access: Genova Piazza Principe; Darsena
- Website: galatamuseodelmare.it

The Galata - Museo del mare is a maritime museum in the Italian city of Genoa. It is the largest museum of its kind in the Mediterranean area and also one of the most modern in Italy. The museum is located on the grounds of the Porto Antico, in the Palazzo Galata (named after the ancient colony of Galata) in the Darsena district, where galleys were built in the Republic of Genoa era. It is close to downtown Genoa, the Port of Genoa, and within walking distance of Genova Principe train station and Darsena metro stop. It opened in 2004 as part of Genoa's 2004 European Capital of Culture celebration.

== History ==
Galata is a historic district of Istanbul, Turkey, and until the 15th century, home to one of the most important Genoese communities in the Mediterranean. Therefore, in the late 19th century, when the Municipality of Genoa built a district of commercial docks, the oldest of these was given the name of the ancient colony. In the 19th century, this district served as a busy shipyard. In its lower part, the galleys of the Republic of Genoa were built, and it was part of the "Arsenale", the most important military and maritime complex in the city. In the 20th century, Galata lost its commercial function and was abandoned. In the late 1990s, the municipality decided to establish the seat of the future maritime museum of Genoa in the Galata district.

Opened in 2004, the museum is located in the Palazzo Galata, whose renovation was designed by the Spanish architect Guillermo Vázquez Consuegra. In addition to a natural-scale reproduction of a Genoese galley, the museum houses several interactive rooms which help visitors understand what it meant to go to sea in different eras. One of these is the "La Merica" exhibition, open since 2011, dedicated to the history of Italian migration. It shows both the lot of exploited immigrants in Genoa in the 19th century and that of Italian emigrants who traveled to the United States, Argentina, and Brazil on overcrowded ships, and founded an Italian diaspora in the New World. Special emphasis is placed on current immigration trends as well as the European migrant crisis.

In 2005, the Galata museum merged with the Commenda Museum-Theater and the Naval Museum of Pegli, together forming the Mu.MA - Istituzione Musei del Mare e delle Migrazioni (Institute of Museums of the Sea and Migration) to better combine the topics of the sea and migration.

== The museum ==
The ground floor tells the tale of galleys. It houses a faithful reconstruction of a 17th-century Genoese galley placed on the original slipways. The same floor contains the Darsena weapons exhibit with its racks of knives, breastplates, and helmets. Other rooms hold portraits of Christopher Columbus and Andrea Doria as well as precious world maps and ancient portolans which can be consulted using virtual navigation. The exhibit also holds several autographed documents belonging to Columbus.

The first and second floors are dedicated to sailing and to shipyards. An entire room is occupied by a reproduction of the brigantine "Anna", on which one can access the deck and appreciate many original nautical instruments. Another room shows a reconstruction of a shipyard in the late 18th century, with its various carpentry tools in the mechanical workshop. In yet another room, a virtual reconstruction allows, through sound effects, to experience a storm off Cape Horn.

The 1,200m^{2} third floor houses an exhibition entirely dedicated to the era of transatlantic liners. Visitors can access the bridge of a steamship from the immigrant era, and a naval simulator offers a simulated crossing of the Atlantic from the Strait of Gibraltar to New York, passing under the Statue of Liberty, then on to Ellis Island. Among the objects collected during shipwrecks are a bell from the SS Rex and a lifebuoy used by one of the survivors of the RMS Lusitania.

=== Shipowners' Hall ===
Located on the third floor of the museum, the Shipowners' Hall was opened on 2 March 2017; it tells the story of Genoa and its port through its protagonists: the shipowners.

=== Other exhibits and facilities ===
- The museum owns the raft which saved Ambrogio Fogar when his boat was hit by orcas in 1978 off the Falkland Islands. Ambrogio survived the ordeal but his travel companion Mauro Mancini died while waiting to be rescued. In 2010, 32 years after the incident, the Fogar family decided to donate the raft to the Galata - Museo del mare museum.

Other facilities include an exhibition hall, library, and a café with an outdoor terrace. The museum attracts many school field trips, and its proximity to Genova Principe train station and Darsena metro stop making it conveniently accessible.

=== The submarine museum ===
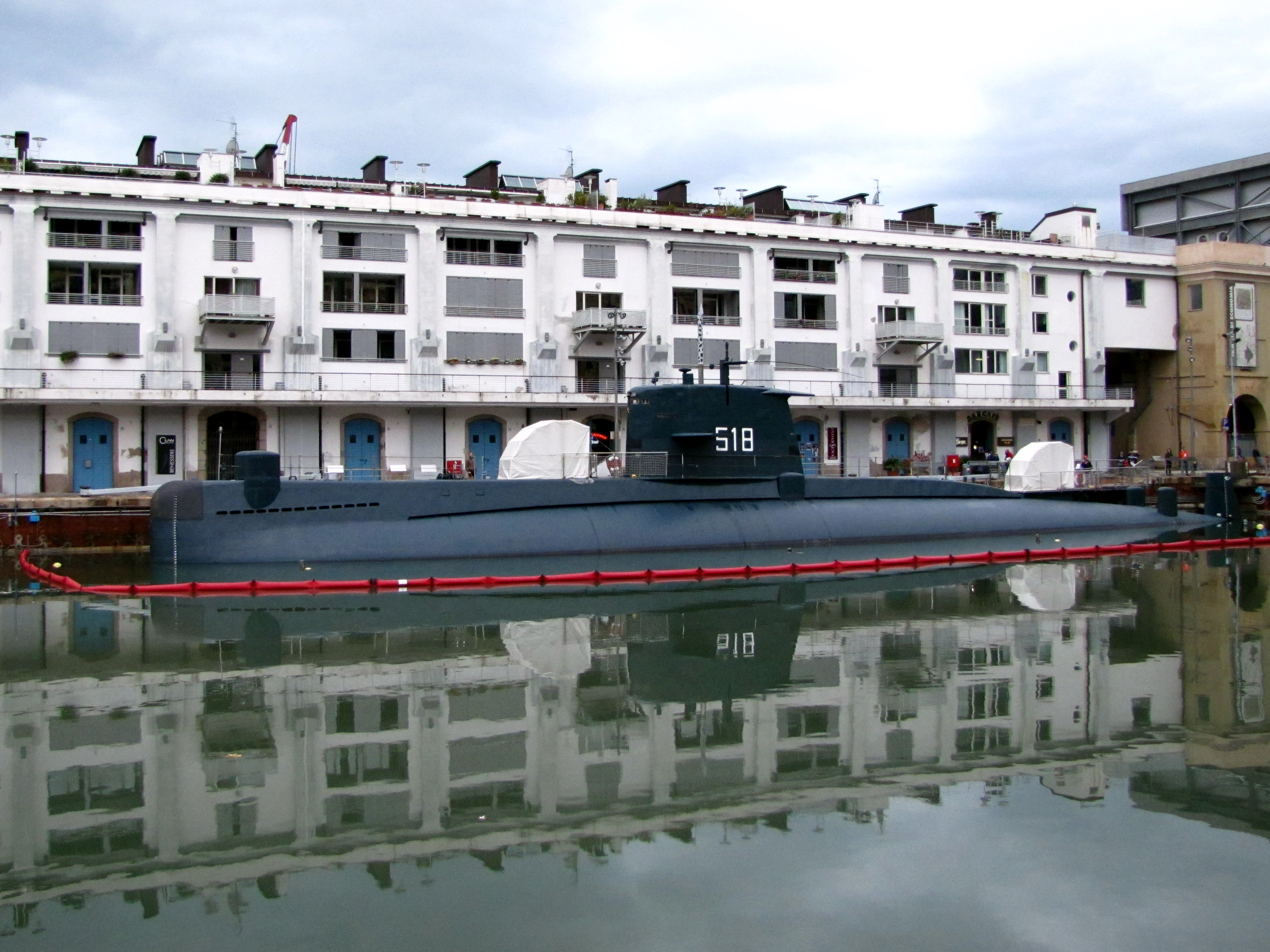
Italian submarine Nazario Sauro at the Galata museum in Genoa

Since 26 September 2009, the diesel-electric submarine Nazario Sauro (S 518), launched in 1976 by Fincantieri di Monfalcone shipbuilders, has been moored at the dock in front of the Museo del mare. Intended by the Italian Navy to serve the municipality of Genoa, it has been used since 29 May 2010 as a floating annex to the museum.

==== Sections of the submarine ====
Parts which can be visited

- 1. Propulsion electric motor
- 2. Electrical panels
- 3. Thermal engines
- 4. NCO lodging
- 5. Control room
- 6. Officers' room
- 7. Captain's lodging
- 8. Officers' lodging
- 9. Watertight hatch
- 10. Sonar
- 11. Crew lodging
- 12. Launch chamber
- 13. Canteen
- 14. Kitchen

== Floor layout ==
=== Ground floor ===
- Bookshop
- "L'affresco" by Renzo Piano
- Auditorium
- 1. Genoa, the port after the Middle Ages
- 2. Christopher Columbus, a Genoese sailor?
- 3. Andrea Doria and the Genoese galleys
- 4. Weapons of the Republic
- 5. Arsenal: the galley on the slipway
- 6. The playroom galley - for children

=== First floor ===
- 7. Galleys, between history and art
- 8. The galley bridge
- 9. Journey to the time of the galleys
- 10. Atlases and globes
- 11. The vessels
- Storage area
- Art rooms
- Galata cafe

=== Second floor ===
- 12. Genoa and the age of revolutions
- 13. Storms & shipwrecks
- 14. The nautical sciences
- 15. The "Anna" brig
- 16. Shipyard
- Renzo Piano document center
- Learning space
- 17. Beppe Croce Gallery
- Exhibition gallery

=== Third floor ===
- 18. 1861, the call
- 19. Genoa and its alleys is the starting point
- 20. The Maritime Station
- 21. Boarding, the departure
- 22. Life on board the "Città di Torino" steamship
- 23. La Boca (Genovese neighbourhood in Buenos Aires, Argentina)
- 24. The farm (Brazil)
- 25. Ellis Island (USA)
- 26. Italy 2011
- 27. The steamer
- 28. School of submarines - interactive
- 29. The shipowners' room

=== Fourth floor ===
- Mirador Terrace
- Vespucci Hall
- Clock room

== Image gallery ==
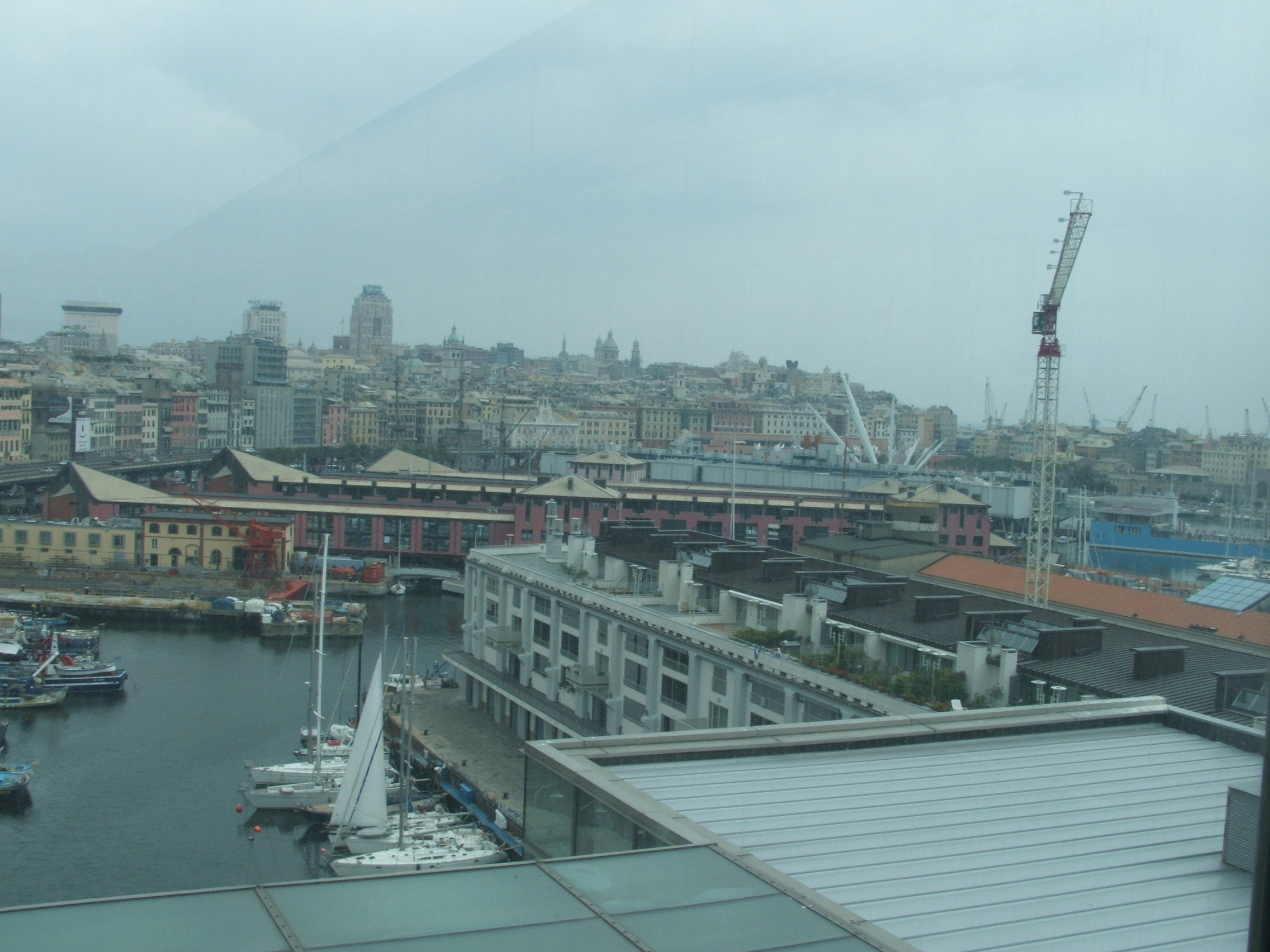
View from the top of the museum onto Belvedere Vittorio Pertuso

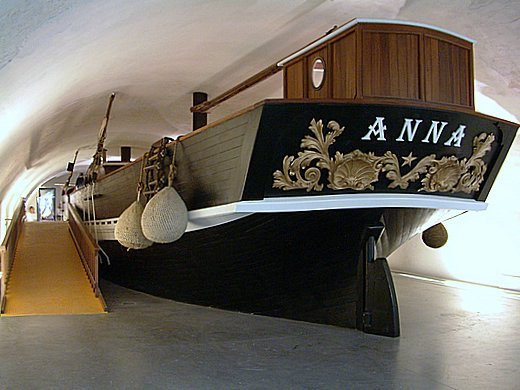
Stern of the brigantine "Anna"

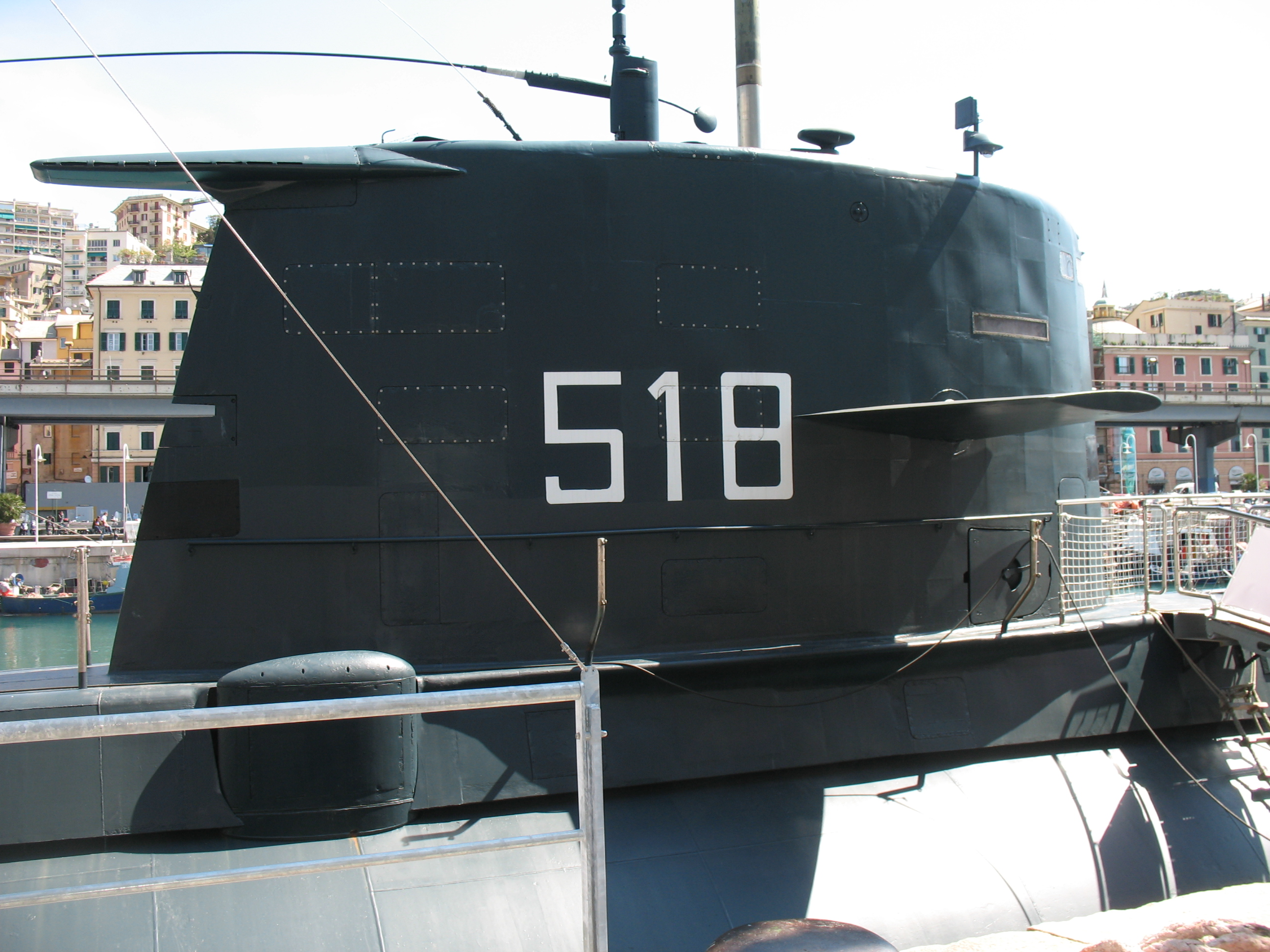
Detail of the submarine Nazario Sauro S 518

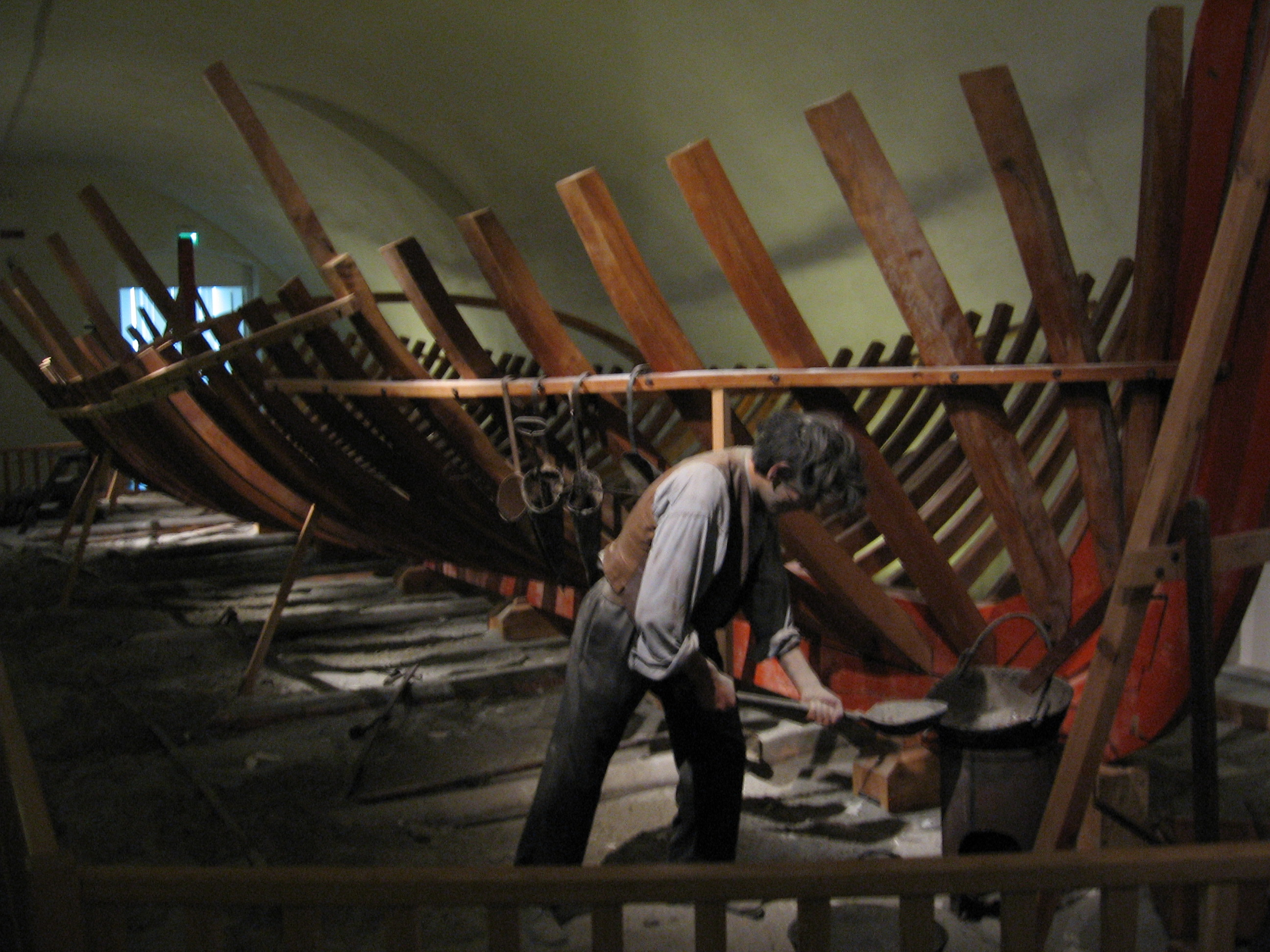
Building a galley
