= Italian submarine Guglielmo Marconi (S 521) =

Sauro-class submarines

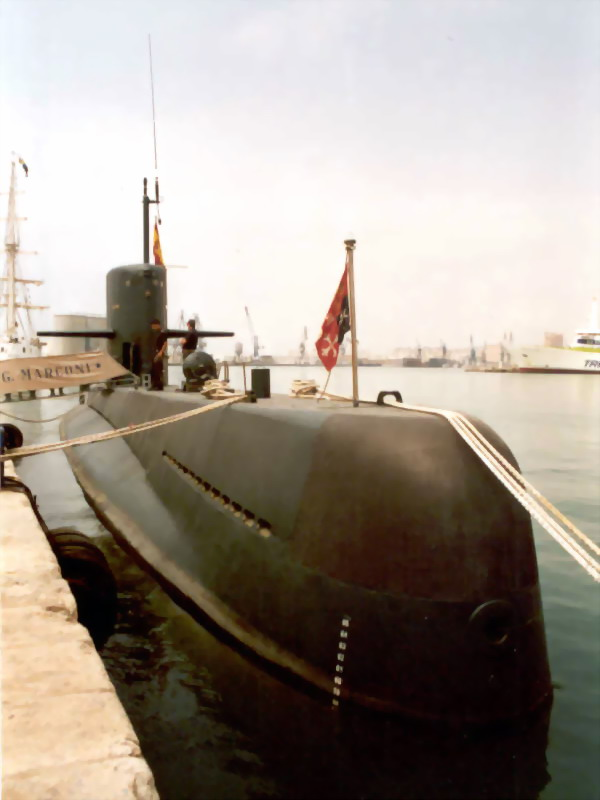
- Guglielmo Marconi

History

Italy
- Name: Guglielmo Marconi
- Namesake: Guglielmo Marconi
- Builder: Fincantieri, Monfalcone
- Laid down: 23 October 1979
- Launched: 20 September 1980
- Commissioned: 11 September 1982
- Decommissioned: 1 October 2003
- Home port: La Spezia
- Identification: Pennant number: S 521
- Fate: Scrapped Aliaga Turkey 2024

General characteristics
- Class & type: Sauro-class submarine
- Displacement: 1,456 tonnes (surfaced); 1,641 tonnes (submerged)
- Length: 63.85 m (209.5 ft)
- Beam: 6.83 m (22.4 ft)
- Draught: 5.3 m (17.4 ft)
- Depth: 300 m (984.3 ft)
- Propulsion: 3-shaft diesel Grandi Motori Trieste GMT 210.16-NM (2,7 mW); 1 electric engine Magneti Marelli (2.686 kW)
- Speed: 12 knots (22 km/h; 14 mph) (surfaced); 19 knots (35 km/h; 22 mph) (submerged)
- Range: 2,500 nmi (4,600 km; 2,900 mi) at 12 knots (22 km/h; 14 mph)
- Complement: 7 officers; 44 enlisted
- Sensors & processing systems: 1 x radar SMA SPS-704; 1 x sonar Elsag-USEA IPD70/S; Submarine Action Information System SMA/Datamat MM/SBN-716 SACTIS; periscopes Barr & Stroud CK31 Search and CH81 Attack Periscopes; communication system by ELMER
- Electronic warfare & decoys: ESM systems Elettronica Spa, Thetis ELT/124-s and MM-BLD/1
- Armament: 6 × 533 mm (21 in) torpedo tubes with reloads for: 1.) Black Shark torpedo; 2.) Naval mines

Guglielmo Marconi (S 521) was a Sauro-class submarine of the Italian Navy.

== Construction and career ==
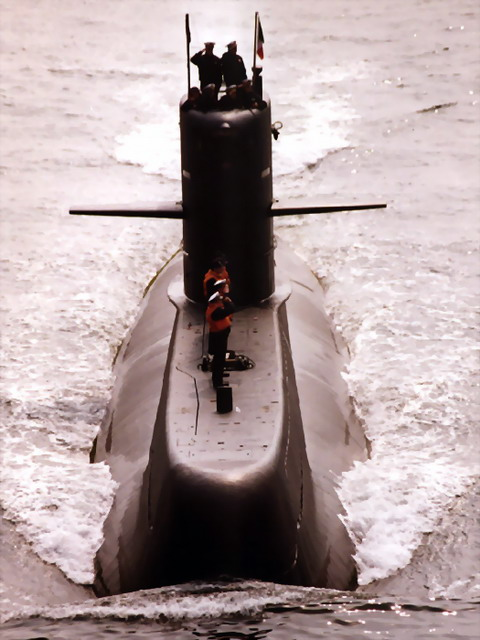
Guglielmo Marconi underway in 1995

Guglielmo Marconi was laid down at Fincantieri Monfalcone Shipyard on 1 July 1976 and launched on 20 October 1979. She was commissioned on 6 November 1982.

She was decommissioned on 30 June 2010. She is currently moored at Quay Sauro Calata San Vito, pier 2, north side in the La Spezia Naval Base. Gugliemo Marconi was sold for scrap 2023.
