= Darsena (Genoa Metro) =

Genoa Metro station

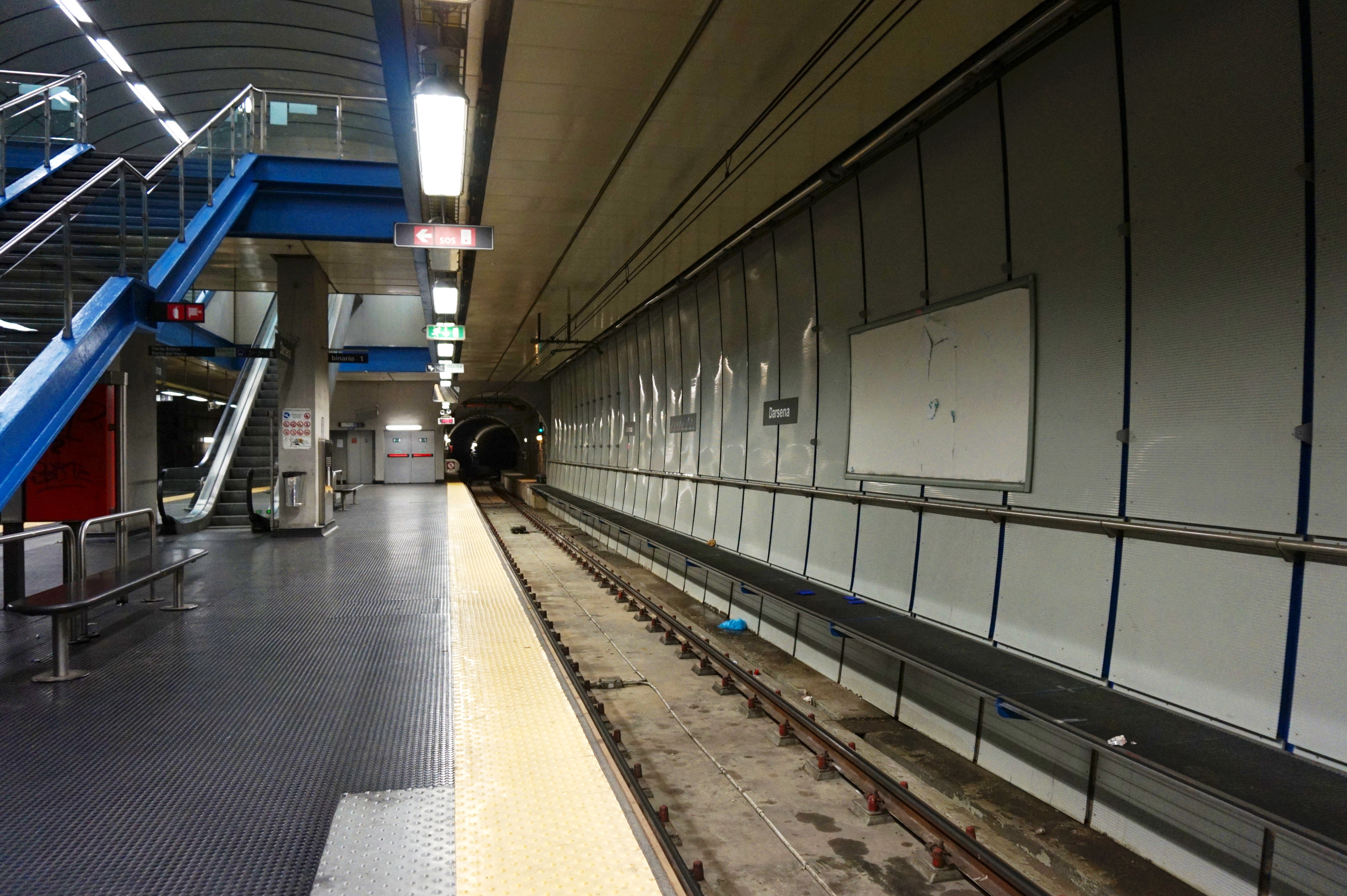

General information
- Location: Via Antonio Gramsci at Piazza della Darsena, Genoa; Italy
- Coordinates: 44°24′47″N 8°55′36″E
- Owner: AMT Genoa
- Tracks: 2

Construction
- Structure type: Underground
- Accessible: Yes

History
- Opened: 25 July 2003

Services
Preceding station	Genoa Metro	Following station
Principe towards Brin	Genoa Metro	San Giorgio towards Brignole
Location

Darsena is a Genoa Metro station, located on Via Antonio Gramsci close to Piazza della Darsena, in Genoa, Italy. Darsena translates to dock in English. The station serves the old port area of the city.

The station has a very large, bright mezzanine. There are two exits: one is in the northerly sidewalk, the other is towards the quayside, under the elevated Strada Aldo Moro.

The station officially opened on 25 July 2003 but functional operation began on 7 August.
