= Sauro-class submarine =

Italian submarine class

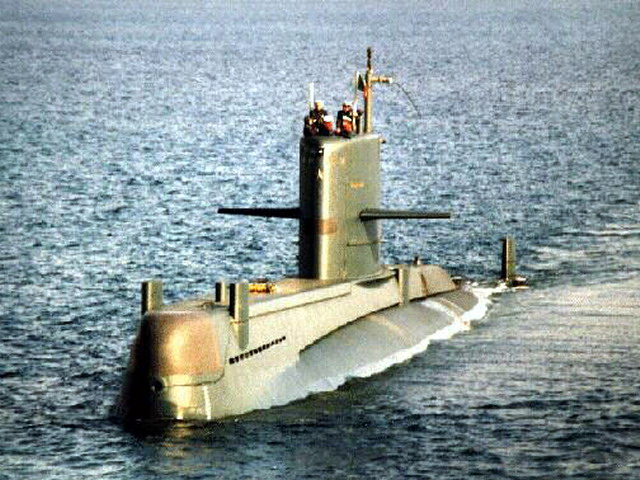

Class overview
- Name: Sauro class
- Builders: Italcantieri; Monfalcone shipyard
- Operators: Italian Navy
- Preceded by: Toti class, Tang class, Tench class
- Succeeded by: Todaro class
- In service: 1980
- In commission: 1979
- Completed: 8
- Active: 4
- Retired: 4
- Preserved: 1

General characteristics
- Type: Submarine
- Displacement: I and II Batches: 1,456 tons surfaced; 1,641 tons submerged; III Batch: 1,476 tons surfaced; 1,662 tons submerged; IV Batch: 1,653 tons surfaced; 1,862 tons submerged
- Length: I and II Batches: 63.85 m; III Batch: 64.36 m; IV Batch: 66.00 m
- Beam: 6.83 m
- Draught: I and II Batches: 5.3 m; III Batch: 5.6 m; IV Batch: 6.3 m
- Propulsion: 3 x shaft diesel Grandi Motori Trieste GMT 210.16-NM (2,7 MW); I, II and III Batches:: 1 electric engine Magneti Marelli (2.686 kW); IV Batch:: 1 electric engine ABB
- Speed: 12 knots (22 km/h; 14 mph) surfaced; 19 knots (35 km/h; 22 mph) submerged
- Range: 2,500 nmi (4,600 km; 2,900 mi) to 12 knots (22 km/h; 14 mph)
- Test depth: 300 m
- Complement: 7 officers, 44 men
- Sensors & processing systems: I and II Batches: 1 x radar SMA SPS-704; 1 x sonar Elsag-USEA IPD70/S; Submarine Action Information System SMA/Datamat MM/SBN-716 SACTIS; periscopes Barr & Stroud CK31 Search and CH81 Attack Periscopes; communication system by ELMER; III and IV Batches, after update 1999/2005: 1 x radar SMA MM/BPS 704-V2; 1 x sonar STN Atlas Elektronik – ISUS 90-20; Combat System STN Atlas Elektronik – ISUS 90-20; periscopes Kollmorgen; communication system IRSC, by Hagenuk Marinekommunikation
- Electronic warfare & decoys: I and II Batches: ESM systems Elettronica Spa, Thetis ELT/124-s and MM-BLD/1; III and IV Batches, after update 1999/2005: ESM systems Elettronica Spa, BLD-727
- Armament: I and II Batches:: 6 x 533 mm torpedo tubes; 12 torpedoes Whitehead A-184 or 24 mines carried; III and IV Batches:: 6 x 533 mm torpedo tubes; 12 torpedoes Whitehead A-184 Mod.3 or 24 mines carried

The Nazario Sauro class are diesel-electric submarines operated by the Italian Navy. All boats were built by Fincantieri in Monfalcone.

== History ==
Italy developed the Sauro-class submarines in the 1970s to counter the underwater threat of the Soviet Union. Italian shipbuilding company Fincantieri built these vessels in Monfalcone.

The class entered service in 1980 and replaced the mixed fleet of Toti, Tang, and Tench-class submarines. A further two units, Leonardo da Vinci and Guglielmo Marconi were commissioned in 1981 and 1982. In 1983 and 1988 two additional pairs of boats were ordered to the Improved Sauro-class design. They were delivered in 1988–1989 and 1994–1995 by Fincantieri. They were eventually succeeded by the Todaro class (the joint German-Italian Type 212-based group).

Sauro and Cossato were Batch I boats while da Vinci and Marconi were Batch II boats. Pelosi and Prini made up Batch III and Longobardo and Priaroggia were the two Batch IV boats.

- Batches I and II boats displacement was 1,456 tons surfaced and 1,641 tons submerged. The boats carried SMA SPS-704 radar and Elsag-USEA IPD70/S sonar system.
- Batch III 1,476 tons surfaced and 1,662 tons submerged. These boats had SMA MM/BPS-704-V2 radar and STN Atlas Elektronik-ISUS 90–20 series sonar.
- Batch IV 1,653 tons surfaced and 1,862 submerged weight.

Lengths varied between the batches. Beams measured 6.8 meters for all of the class. Draught was increased progressively from 5.3 meters to 6.3 meters. Armament of all the batches was 6 x 533mm torpedo tubes with 12 reloads carried. Batches I and II used Whitehead A-184 torpedo series while batches III and IV used upgraded Whitehead A-184 Mod 3 series.

Sauro and Marconi were retired in 2001 and 2002 respectively. In 2005, the remaining two original submarines were retired and the remaining four, Salvatore Pelosi (S522), Giuliano Prini (S523), Primo Longobardo (S524), and Gianfranco Gazzana Priaroggia (S525) were upgraded. These upgrades included replacement of the acoustic sensors and weapons control system, improvements in the communications system, and extension of the service lines.

US approached Italy to purchase retired Sauro-class submarines. Italy tentatively agreed but Taiwan rejected the offer. The plan called for the US to purchase four submarines when decommissioned, then refurbish them in the US and sell them to Taiwan. Once refurbished, the Italian submarines were expected to be operational for another 15 years, and the deal included an extension program.

== Design ==
There are three sub groups built in four batches:

- S 518 Nazario Sauro named after Nazario Sauro; since September 2009, this unit has been a museum ship in Genoa (part of Galata - Museo del mare).
- S 519 Carlo Fecia di Cossato named after Italian World War II submarine commander Carlo Fecia di Cossato
- S 520 Leonardo da Vinci, named after Leonardo da Vinci
- S 521 Guglielmo Marconi, named after Guglielmo Marconi
- S 522 Salvatore Pelosi, named after Italian World War II submarine commander and war hero Salvatore Pelosi
- S 523 Giuliano Prini, named after Italian World War II submarine commander and war hero Giuliano Prini
- S 524 Primo Longobardo, named after Italian World War II submarine commander and war hero Primo Longobardo
- S 525 Gianfranco Gazzana Priaroggia, named after Italian World War II submarine commander and war hero Gianfranco Gazzana-Priaroggia

== List of boats ==
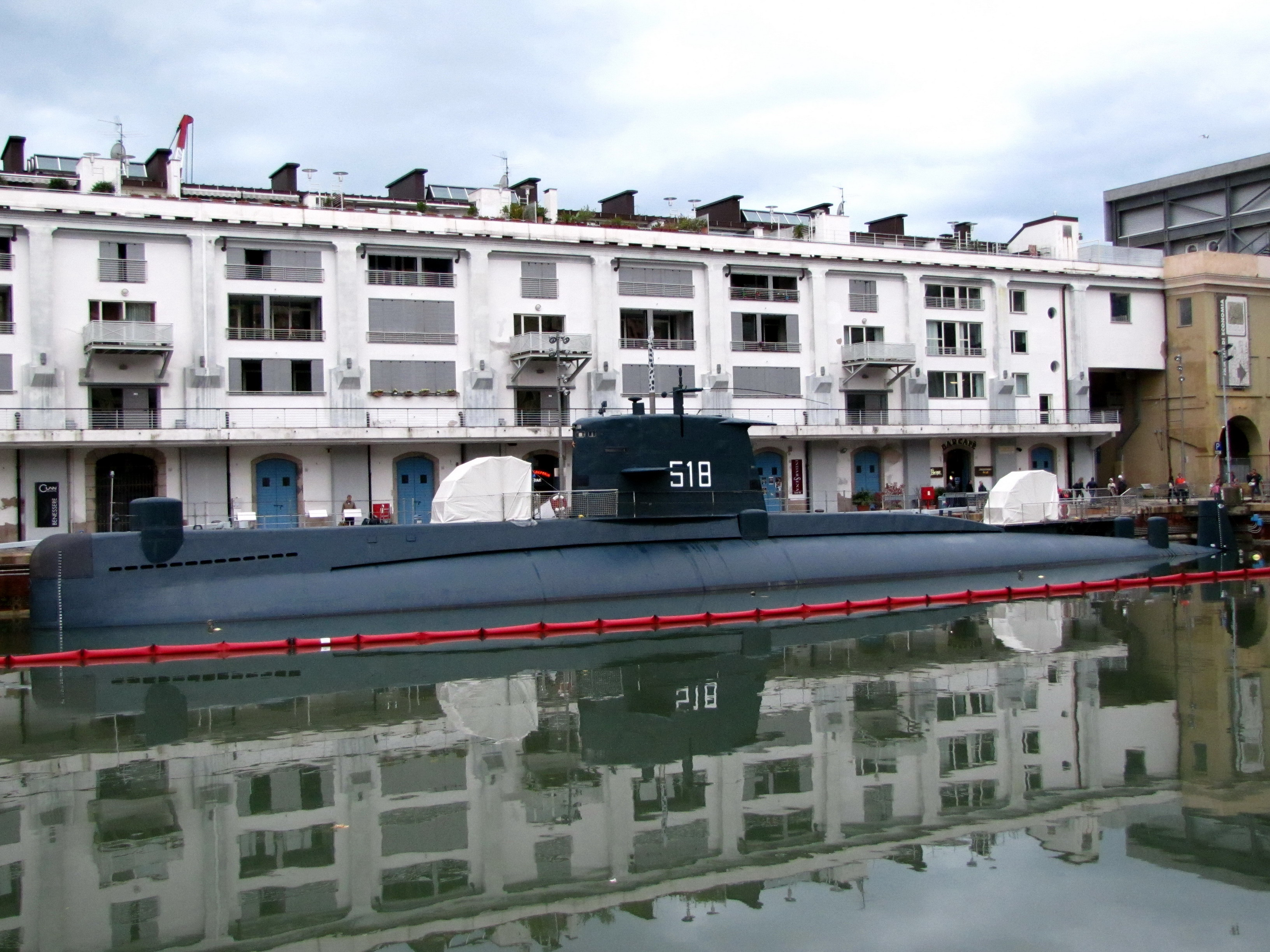
Sauro at the Genoa Galata Museum

Italian Navy - Sauro class
Pennant number	Name	Batch	Shipyard	Hull number	Laid down	Launched	Commissioned	Decommissioned	Image
S 518	Nazario Sauro	I	Fincantieri; Monfalcone (Gorizia)	4257	26 June 1974	9 October 1976	1 March 1980	30 April 2002	
S 519	Carlo Fecia di Cossato	I	Fincantieri; Monfalcone (Gorizia)	4258	15 November 1975	16 November 1977	5 November 1979	1 April 2005	
S 520	Leonardo da Vinci	II	Fincantieri; Monfalcone (Gorizia)	4339	1 July 1976	20 October 1979	6 November 1982	30 June 2010	
S 521	Guglielmo Marconi	II	Fincantieri; Monfalcone (Gorizia)	4340	23 October 1979	20 September 1980	11 September 1982	1 October 2003	
S 522	Salvatore Pelosi	III	Fincantieri; Monfalcone (Gorizia)	4405	23 July 1985	29 November 1986	14 July 1988	in service	
S 523	Giuliano Prini	III	Fincantieri; Monfalcone (Gorizia)	4406	30 July 1987	12 December 1987	17 May 1989	in service	
S 524	Primo Longobardo	IV	Fincantieri; Monfalcone (Gorizia)	5878	19 December 1991	20 June 1992	14 December 1993	in service	
S 525	Gianfranco Gazzana Priaroggia	IV	Fincantieri; Monfalcone (Gorizia)	5879	12 November 1992	26 June 1993	12 June 1995	in service	

== See also ==
- List of submarine classes in service

Equivalent submarines of the same era

- Agosta class
- Type 209
- Santa Cruz class
- Näcken class
- Sava class

== Bibliography ==
- Gardiner, Robert; Chumbley, Stephen; Budzbon, Przemysław, eds. (1995). Conway's All the World's Fighting Ships 1947–1995. Annapolis: Naval Institute Press. ISBN 1-55750-132-7.
