= Salvatore Pelosi =

World War 2 Italian naval officer

- Born: 10 April 1906; Montella, Avellino, Italy
- Died: 24 October 1974 (aged 68)
- Military career
- Allegiance: Italy
- Branch: Italian Navy
- Service years: 1923–1969
- Rank: Ammiraglio di squadra
- Commands: Torricelli; Alfredo Oriani
- Conflicts: Second Italo-Ethiopian War; World War II
- Awards: Gold Medal of Military Valour

Salvatore Pelosi (10 April 1906 – 24 October 1974) was an Italian naval officer who fought in World War II. As commander of the submarine Torricelli he made a gallant last stand against overwhelming British naval forces in June 1940.

== Early career ==
Pelosi was born in Montella, in the province of Avellino, and entered the Naval Academy at Livorno in 1921. In 1923 he was commissioned as a junior officer, and served aboard the battleship Duilio, and then the cruiser Libia in the Far East, where he also served in the San Marco Battalion based at the Italian concession of Tientsin. He returned to Italy to attend the Advanced Course at the Naval Academy, specializing in gunnery. He was promoted to Tenente di Vascello and served aboard the destroyers Bettino Ricasoli and Pantera as gunnery officer, then aboard the cruiser Bolzano as navigating officer. In 1933 he was transferred to the cruiser Gorizia, in which he took part in operations during the conflict with Ethiopia in 1935/36. He later commanded a squadron of torpedo boats in Sicily, and also took part in operations during the Spanish Civil War. He was promoted to Capitano di corvetta, and commanded several submarines before taking command of the Torricelli at the start of the war.

== Red Sea ==
In 1940 Pelosi was the commander of the submarine Torricelli, part of the Red Sea Flotilla based in Massawa, Eritrea. Toricelli was on patrol in the Gulf of Aden on 23 June 1940 when she was intercepted by a Royal Navy squadron comprising the destroyers HMS Kandahar, Khartoum, Kingston and the sloop Shoreham off Perim. The Torricelli was trapped on the surface and unable to dive due to damage from a previous attack. Pelosi fought back with deck gun and torpedoes at close range, and hit the Shoreham, but with his submarine heavily damaged, and himself badly wounded, he eventually ordered that the submarine be scuttled. He had elected to stay aboard and go down with his boat, but his men dragged him off the sinking submarine. A shell from the Torricelli may have also hit Khartoum, which hours later suffered from an explosion and fire in a magazine. She was forced to beach and was later written off. Pelosi was awarded the Gold Medal of Military Valor for this action, and spent the rest of the war as a POW.

== Post-war ==
Pelosi was repatriated in 1945 and was promoted to Capitano di fregata, with seniority from 1942. He first served as Chief of Staff of Submarine Command, and later as Commander of Submarines. In 1948, after the period in command of the destroyer Alfredo Oriani, he was promoted to Capitano di vascello. He attended the Istituto di Guerra Marittima, and from December 1949 to August 1951 was commander of Italian Naval Forces in the Trust Territory of Somaliland, before serving as Chief of Staff at the maritime department of the lower Tyrrhenian. From 1952 to 1953 he was commander of Coastal Naval Forces, and then served aboard the cruiser Luigi di Savoia Duca degli Abruzzi as Chief of Staff of the 2nd Naval Division until July 1954, when he was appointed Chief of Staff at the Maritime Military Command of Sicily. Pelosi was a promoted to Contrammiraglio on 1 January 1957, and attended the Centro Alti Studi Militari ("Center for High Military Studies"), and served as Inspector of the Corpi Equipaggi Militari Marittimi (CEMM) Schools. After promotion to Ammiraglio di divisione, he served as commander of the Autonomous Maritime Military Command in Sicily, and on promotion to Ammiraglio di squadra in 1964, he was appointed Commander-in-Chief of the Maritime Department of the Ionian and Lower Adriatic Sea, and also served as President of the Commissione Ordinaria di Avanzamento ("Ordinary Commission of Promotion"). He also served as President of the Consiglio Superiore di Marina ("Superior Council of the Navy"). In 1969, having reached the mandatory age limit, he retired. Pelosi died on 24 October 1974.

A Sauro-class submarine, the S522 Pelosi, is named after him.
