= Gianfranco Gazzana-Priaroggia =

Italian naval officer (1912–1943)

Gianfranco Gazzana Priaroggia
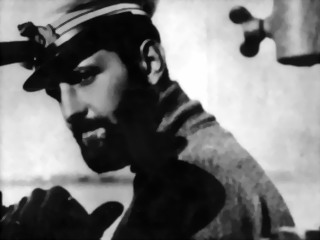
- Born: 30 August 1912; Milan
- Died: 23 May 1943 (aged 30); North Atlantic
- Military career
- Allegiance: Kingdom of Italy
- Branch: Regia Marina
- Rank: Capitano di corvetta
- Commands: Archimede; Leonardo da Vinci
- Conflicts: World War II: Battle of the Mediterranean; Battle of the Atlantic
- Awards: Medaglia d'oro al valor militare (23 May 1943); Knight's Cross of the Iron Cross (26 May 1943)

Gianfranco Gazzana Priaroggia (30 August 1912 – 23 May 1943) was an officer in the Italian Royal Navy (Regia Marina), and the highest-scoring Italian submarine captain of World War II.

== World War II ==
During the war, Gazzana-Priaroggia served on several submarines, most famously on the Enrico Tazzoli (as second-in-command of the fellow submarine ace Carlo Fecia di Cossato); then he was appointed commander of the Archimede and finally of Leonardo da Vinci. He was responsible for sinking 120,243 GRT (Bruttoregistertonnen, or BRT). With a higher score than Britain's Malcolm David Wanklyn in HMS Upholder, or America's Richard O'Kane in USS Tang (both later sunk), Gazzana-Priaroggia and Leonardo da Vinci were the most successful non-German submariner and submarine in the conflict.

On 23 May 1943, Gazzana-Priaroggia, returning from his last successful patrol (for which he had earned a battlefield promotion to the rank of Capitano di corvetta), died alongside his crew when the Leonardo da Vinci was sunk, with all hands lost, by the destroyer HMS Active and the frigate HMS Ness west of Cape Finisterre. He was posthumously awarded the Medaglia d'oro al valor militare and Knight's Cross of the Iron Cross.

== Legacy ==
Two submarines have been named after him. The USS Pickerel which was transferred from the US Navy in 1972 and a Sauro-class submarine.
