= RMS Empress of Canada (1920) =

Ocean liner

Coordinates: 1°13′0″S 9°57′0″W

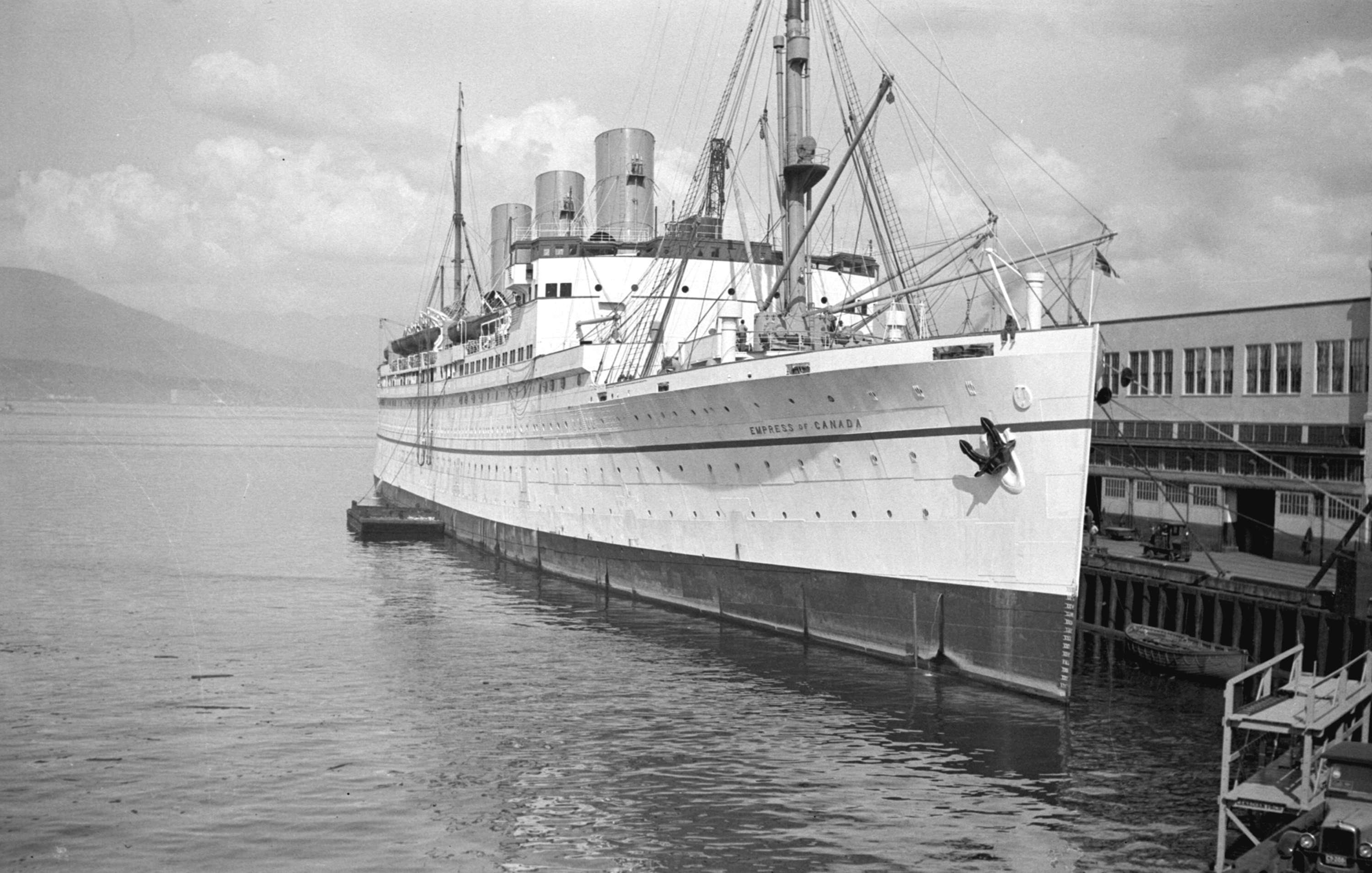
- RMS Empress of Canada docked at Vancouver, June 1936.

History

United Kingdom
- Name: Empress of Canada
- Owner: Canadian Pacific Steamships
- Operator: 1922–1939: Canadian Pacific Steamships; 1939–1943: British Admiralty
- Port of registry: 1922–1939: Canada
- Ordered: 1920
- Builder: Fairfield Shipbuilding & Engineering Company, Govan
- Cost: Approximately $6,800,000
- Yard number: 528
- Launched: 18 August 1920
- Completed: May 1922
- Maiden voyage: 5 May 1922
- In service: 5 May 1922
- Out of service: 14 March 1943
- Fate: Torpedoed and sunk 14 March 1943

General characteristics
- Type: Ocean liner
- Tonnage: 21,517 GRT
- Length: 653 ft (199.0 m) oa; 627 ft (191.1 m)
- Beam: 77.7 ft (23.7 m)
- Propulsion: 6 steam turbines
- Speed: 18 knots (33 km/h; 21 mph)
- Capacity: 488 1st class passengers; 109 2nd class passengers; 926 3rd class passengers

RMS Empress of Canada was an ocean liner built in 1920 for the Canadian Pacific Steamships (CP) by Fairfield Shipbuilding & Engineering Company at Govan on the Clyde in Scotland. This ship—the first of three CP vessels to be named Empress of Canada (Note: The third SS Empress of Canada (1961) was built for CP Ships.)—regularly traversed the trans-Pacific route between the west coast of Canada and the Asian waters until 1939.

== History ==
In 1920, Canadian Pacific Steamships ordered a new ship to be built by Fairfield Shipbuilding & Engineering Company at Govan near Glasgow in Scotland. This Empress was a 653-foot (199 m) ocean liner measuring 21,517 gross register tons (GRT). The ship was launched on 18 August 1920 with a notable speech by the general manager of the Canadian Pacific Ocean Services, Ltd., Sir Thomas Fisher, who noted the approximately $6,800,000 price compared to a pre-war cost of about $2,200,000 and cost of operation that had risen at least 350 per cent, which had forced first class fares from $76 to $202 (based on a $4 to the pound sterling) and predicted dire consequences for shipping and the British Empire. A world tour, planned for early 1921, was cancelled due to labour disturbances making on-schedule completion doubtful.

The liner undertook her maiden voyage on 5 May 1922. Based at the port of Vancouver, British Columbia, Canada, the first Empress of Canada was intended to provide service to the Empire of Japan, Hong Kong, and China. She was at the time the largest vessel ever engaged in trans-Pacific service.

=== Great Kantō earthquake ===
On 4 September 1923, Empress of Canada arrived at Tokyo harbour—just three days after the devastating Great Kantō earthquake struck the city. Those aboard Empress of Canada found that the Canadian ocean liner RMS Empress of Australia had been converted to a command post from which the British consul was directing relief work. Empress of Canada transported refugees – 587 Europeans, 31 Japanese, and 362 Chinese – to Kobe, Japan.

On 13 October 1929, Empress of Canada ran aground off Vancouver Island, British Columbia. Ninety-six passengers were taken off by tender and landed at Victoria, British Columbia. She was refloated on 15 October and towed to Esquimalt, British Columbia, for drydocking.

=== Attack ===
On 5 June 1931, as the Empress of Canada sailed in the Pacific Ocean between Honolulu and Yokohama, 42-year-old Filipino passenger Graciano Bilas killed two people and wounded 29 others in a mass stabbing aboard the ship. Bilas was found to be insane at the time of the crime and was committed to a psychiatric hospital.

=== World War II ===
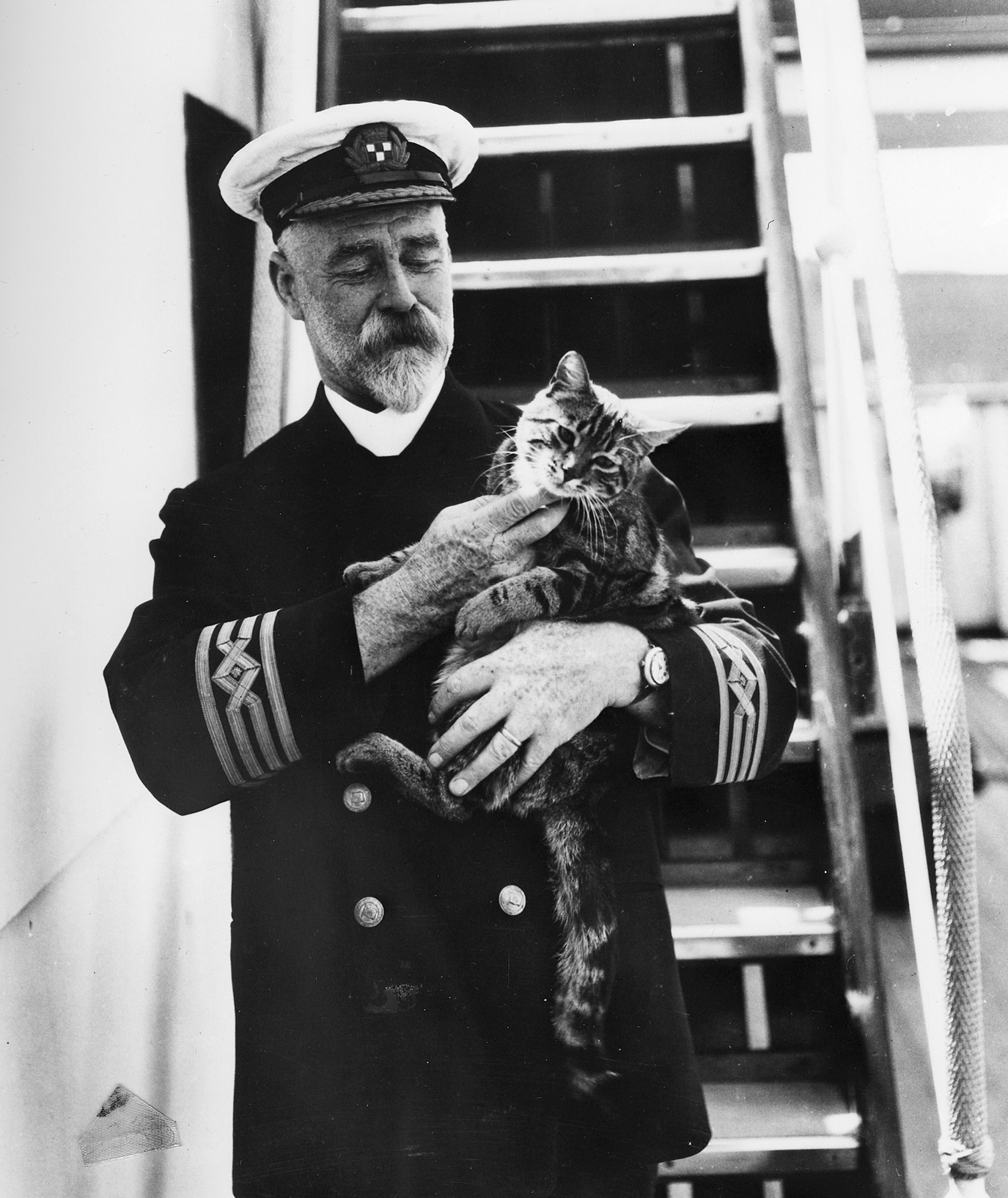
Captain A. J. Hailey with his cat on Empress of Canada, 1920s

Following the outbreak of World War II in 1939, she was converted for use as a troopship. She was one of the ships in the first Australian–New Zealand convoy, designated US.1 for secrecy, destined for North Africa and at that time not yet fully converted for full troop capacity with few ships of the convoy carrying more than 25 per cent more than their normal passenger load. Empress of Canada departed Wellington, New Zealand on 6 January 1940 with the New Zealand elements, joined the Australian ships and arrived in Aden on 8 February from where the convoy split with all ships heading for Suez.

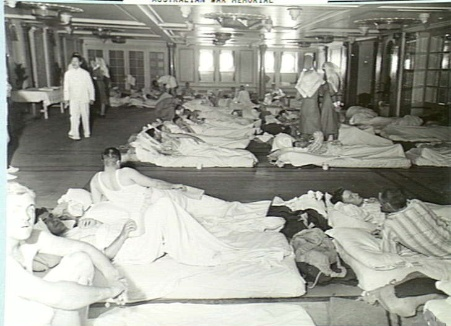
Empress of Canada's ballroom was cleared for sleeping as ANZAC troops are transported from the Antipodes to the war zones in the Northern Hemisphere. This image was captured at sea in January 1940 near Fremantle, Western Australia.

On 14 June 1940 the ship was part of the troop convoy US.3 consisting of the liners Andes, Aquitania, Empress of Britain, Mauretania and Queen Mary, which sailed from Australia en route to the Clyde and was met to the west of Gibraltar by a naval force led by the battlecruiser HMS Hood.

She continued to transport ANZAC troops from New Zealand and from Australia to the war zones in Europe until sunk. The return voyage from Europe was not less dangerous than the trip north had been. On 14 March 1943 at 01.00 am, while en route from Durban, South Africa to Takoradi carrying Italian prisoners of war along with Polish and Greek refugees, Empress of Canada was torpedoed at midnight and sunk by the Italian submarine Leonardo da Vinci approximately 400 miles (640 km) south of Cape Palmas off the coast of Africa. Of the approximate 1,800 people on board, 392 died. 149 of the fatalities reported were Italian prisoners. British rescuers saved 800 of those aboard. Leonardo da Vinci herself was sunk on 23 May 1943 by British destroyer HMS Active and the frigate HMS Ness (both escorts to convoys WS-30 and KMF-15), with no survivors.

== See also ==
- List of ocean liners
