= Jim Wilson (librarian) =

New Zealand librarian (1915–2001)

Jim Wilson DSC
- Born: James Oakley Wilson; 16 February 1915; Wellington, New Zealand
- Died: 17 November 2001 (aged 86); Wellington, New Zealand
- Other name: J. O. Wilson
- Occupation: librarian
- Known for: chief librarian of the General Assembly Library (1955–1971)

James Oakley Wilson (16 February 1915 – 17 November 2001) was a New Zealand public servant who was a librarian. He was chief librarian of the General Assembly Library from 1955 to 1971, and deputy national librarian from 1971 to 1972. During World War Two, he was a decorated lieutenant, awarded a Distinguished Service Cross for directing the attack from HMS Ness that sank Italian submarine Leonardo da Vinci.

== Early life ==
Wilson was born in Wellington on 16 February 1915. His parents were Charles Stuart Wilson and Florence Emily Wilson (née Oakley). He attended Berhampore School and Wellington College. He graduated from Victoria University College in 1951 with a Master of Commerce degree.

== Early career ==
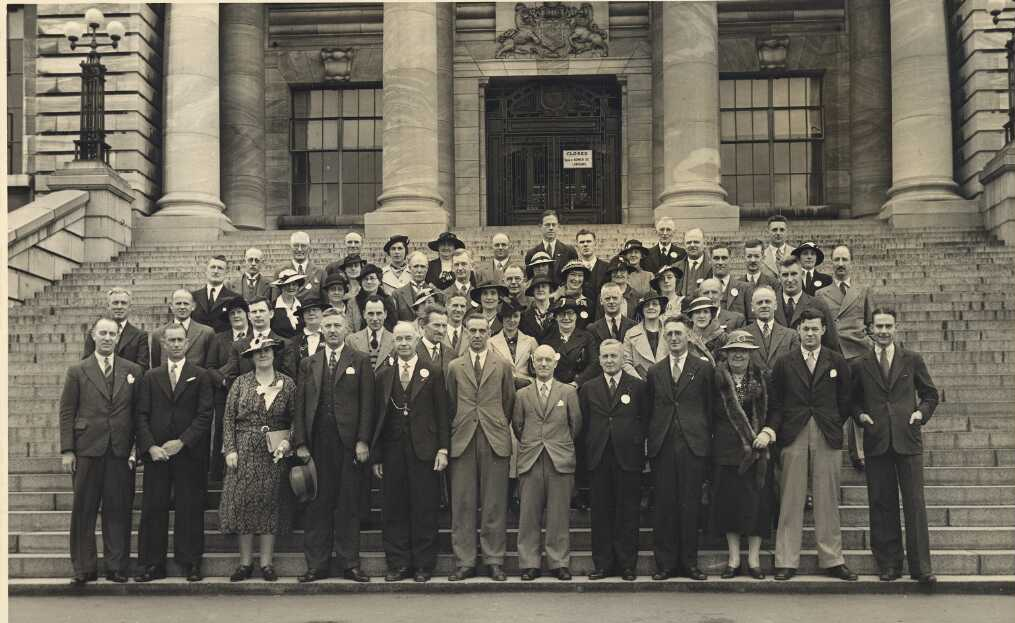
1937 New Zealand Library Association Conference in Wellington; Wilson is the tallest person in the centre of the back row

After leaving school, Wilson was employed by Wellington Public Library for two years as assistant librarian. He then took a role with the General Assembly Library, where he remained from 1934 to 1941.

== War service ==
Wilson was a member of the Royal New Zealand Naval Volunteer Reserve. He joined in July 1941, and was on loan to the Royal Navy from 1941 to 1946 with the eventual rank of lieutenant. The Italian submarine Leonardo da Vinci was intercepted by the destroyer HMS Active and the frigate HMS Ness on 23 May 1943. The submarine was subjected to an intense depth charge attack and sunk. Wilson directed the attack on HMS Ness and later that year was awarded a Distinguished Service Cross for his role in the attack.

== Later career ==
In 1946–47, Wilson had a rehabilitation scholarship and visited libraries in the United Kingdom and the United States. He worked for three weeks at the Library of Congress, and reported on his experiences at the 1948 conference of the New Zealand Library Association. After his navy service, Wilson rejoined the General Assembly Library, initially as chief of the reference section. When the chief parliamentary librarian, Guy Scholefield, retired in March 1948, this triggered a series of promotions and Wilson became assistant chief librarian.

Scholefield's successor, William Wauchop, retired at the end of 1954. Wilson was the chief parliamentary librarian, either from late 1954 or from the early 1955 (sources differ) until 1971. He then joined the National Library of New Zealand as deputy national librarian under Hector Macaskill, a role that he held in 1971 and 1972. From 1972, he was director of information and references at the National Library. He retired from the National Library in 1975.

In his Evening Post obituary, he was described as an "old school civil servant" who would not provide an opinion unless asked, and who was "always measured, direct and non-partisan". His political allegiance only became known when he took on the role of acting director of the research unit for the Labour Party in his retirement. He held that role from 1975 to 1980, when he was succeeded by John Henderson.

A March 2000 oral history interview with Wilson, part of the General Assembly Library oral history project, is held by the National Library of New Zealand.

== Memberships ==
In 1934, Wilson became an associate of the Library Association (UK). He was elected fellow of the New Zealand Library Association in 1971. He was on the council of the New Zealand Library Association from 1958 to 1972, including serving as its president in 1971–72. He was an executive member of the New Zealand Book Council from 1972 to 1988, and president from 1981 to 1984. From 1990, he was on the executive of the Government Superannuitants' Association. The Government Superannuitants' Association granted him life membership.

== Works ==
Wilson had an interest in politics and history. In 1959, he wrote an article for The Press, explaining the similarities and differences between the British and New Zealand voting process. He outlined why the British voting system results in much faster declaration of election results. In 1960, Wilson published A finding list of British parliamentary papers relating to New Zealand, 1817–1900. He wrote some of the entries in An Encyclopaedia of New Zealand.

Wilson edited the fourth edition of the Parliamentary Record from 1981 to 1985. Published in 1985, it brought up to date the 1950 edition and its 1969 supplement.

== Family and death ==
Wilson was married twice. In 1946, he married Joan Whittaker, who was a doctor in the British Army. They had three daughters. His wife died in 1961 from cancer. In 1975, he married Joyce Reynolds, the Hutt City librarian.

Wilson died on 17 November 2001 in Wellington.
