= Brazilian cargo ship Cabedello =

Brazilian-owned cargo ship that went missing in WW2

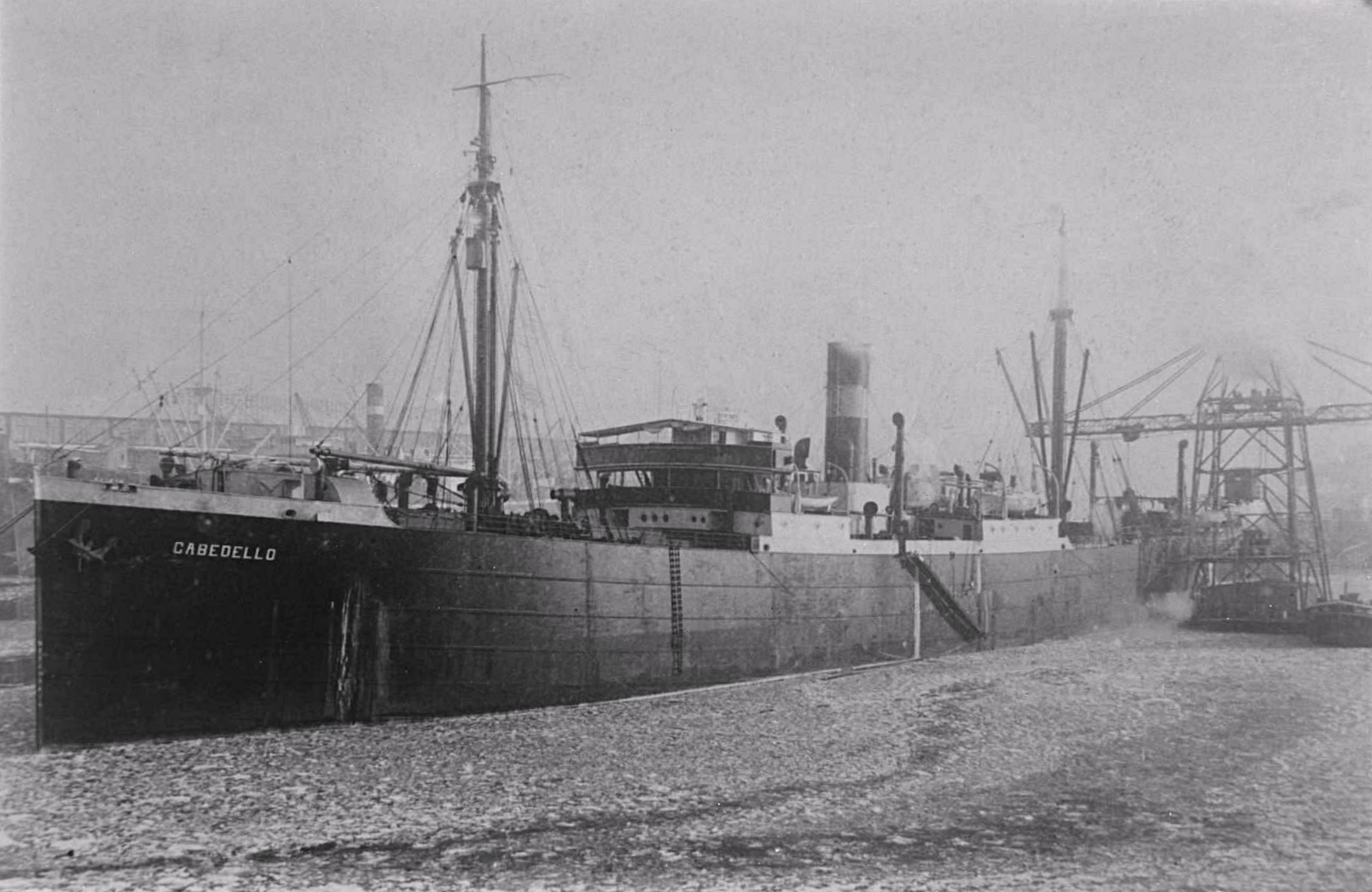
- Cabedello in port

History
- Name: 1912: Prussia; 1917: Cabedello
- Namesake: 1912: Prussia; 1917: Cabedelo
- Owner: 1912: Hamburg America Line; 1917: Government of Brazil; 1927: Lloyd Brasileiro
- Operator: 1920: Government of France; 1923: Lloyd Brasileiro
- Port of registry: 1912: (German Empire) Hamburg; by 1919: (Brazil) Rio de Janeiro
- Route: 1912: Hamburg – eastern South America
- Builder: Flensburger Schiffbau, Flensburg
- Yard number: 321
- Launched: 23 April 1912
- Completed: 14 June 1912
- Identification: 1912: code letters RHSV; by 1918: call sign DJL; by 1934: call sign PUAN
- Fate: missing, February 1942; most likely sunk by the Italian submarine Da Vinci

General characteristics
- Class & type: Prussia-class cargo ship
- Tonnage: 3,557 GRT, 2,180 NRT
- Length: 364.3 ft (111.0 m)
- Beam: 51.0 ft (15.5 m)
- Depth: 22.0 ft (6.7 m)
- Decks: 1
- Installed power: 1 × triple-expansion engine: 318 NHP; 2,200 IHP
- Propulsion: 1 × screw
- Speed: 11 to 12 knots (20 to 22 km/h)
- Crew: 1912: 46; 1942: 54
- Notes: sister ships: Palatia; Phoenecia; Persia; Patria; Polaria; Parthia

Cabedello, also spelt Cabedelo, was a cargo steamship. She was built in Germany for Hamburg America Line (HAPAG) in 1912 as Prussia. She became Cabedello in 1917, when Brazil seized her and renamed her.

In the first weeks of the First World War, Prussia was an auxiliary ship for an Imperial German Navy cruiser in the South Atlantic. That September, Prussia sought refuge in a port in neutral Brazil. Brazil seized her in 1917, after Germany started sinking Brazilian merchant ships.

Lloyd Brasileiro was managing Cabedello by 1923, and owned her by 1927. She disappeared in the Atlantic Ocean in February 1942; most naval historians credit her sinking to the Italian submarine Leonardo da Vinci.

She was the first of two Lloyd Brasileiro cargo ships to be named after Cabedelo in northeastern Brazil. Lloyd's Register always recorded her Brazilian name as Cabedello, with a double "L". After the war, Lloyd Brasileiro owned a cargo ship that was spelt Cabedelo, without the double "L". Canadian Vickers built her in 1945; she was still registered in 1959; but Lloyd's Register had deleted her by 1965.

== Prussia-class cargo ships ==
Between 1912 and 1920, Flensburger Schiffbau-Gesellschaft in Flensburg built a class of seven cargo steamships for HAPAG, for service between Hamburg and the east coast of South America. Prussia was the lead ship of the class. She and Palatia were completed in 1912; followed by Phoenicia and Persia in 1914; Patria in 1919; and Polaria and Parthia in 1920. The last three ships never entered HAPAG service. The United Kingdom seized Patria, Polaria, and Parthia as part of World War I reparations, as soon as they were completed.

== Building and registration ==
Flensburger Schiffbau built the ship as yard number 321; launched her as Prussia on 23 April 1912; and completed her on 14 June. Her registered length was 364.3 ft (111.0 m); her beam was 51.0 ft (15.5 m), and her depth was 22.0 ft (6.7 m). Her tonnages were 3,557 GRT and 2,180 NRT. She had a single screw, driven by a three-cylinder triple-expansion engine that was rated at 318 NHP or 2,200 IHP, and gave her a speed of 11 knots (20 km/h) or 12 knots (22 km/h).

HAPAG registered Prussia in Hamburg. Her code letters were RHSV. She was equipped with wireless telegraphy. In 1918 her German call sign was recorded as DJL, but by that time Brazil had seized her.

== Auxiliary ship ==
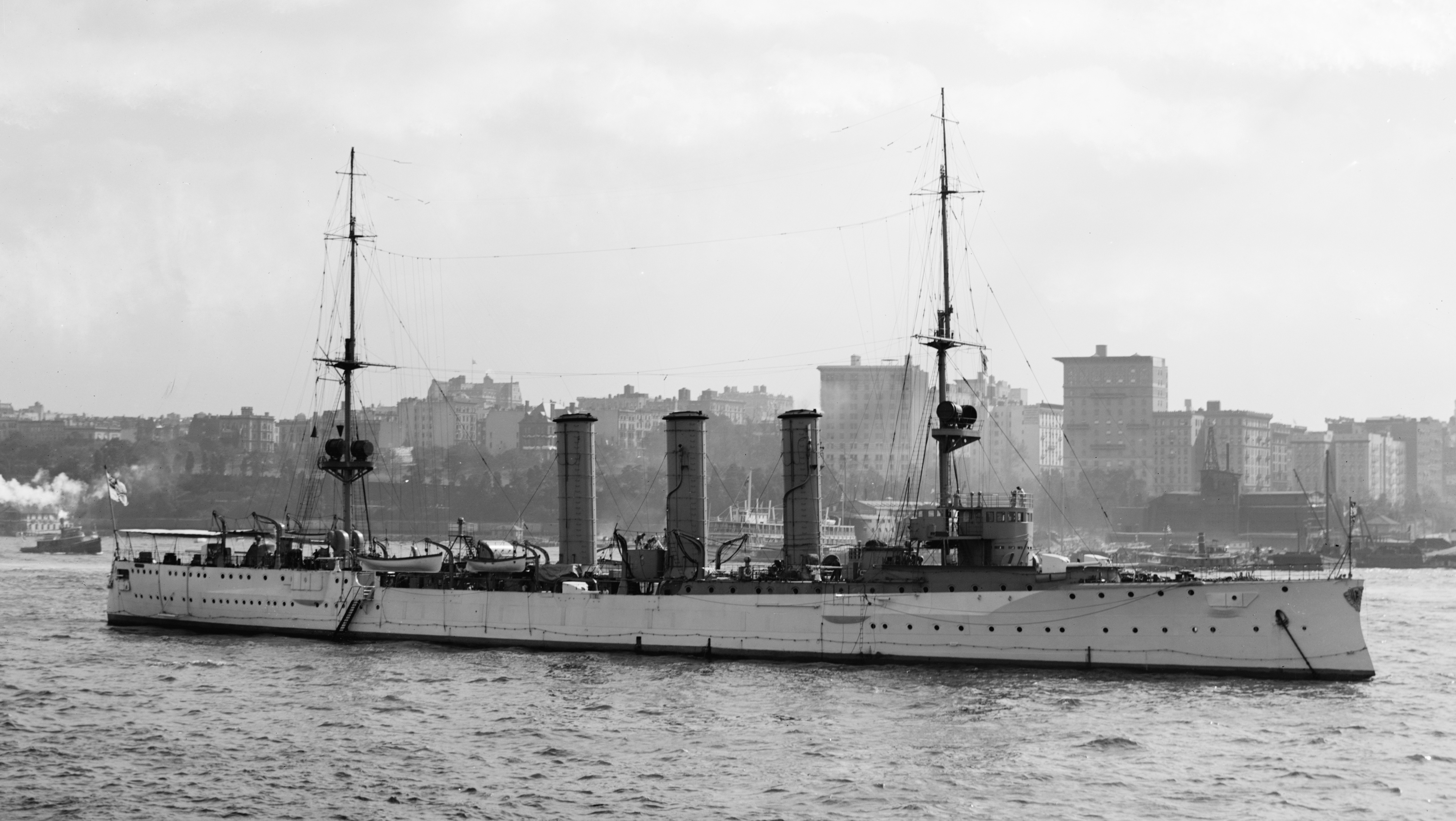
SMS Dresden in New York in 1909

In the first weeks of the First World War, Prussia was an auxiliary ship for the cruiser SMS Dresden. On 15 August 1914, Dresden captured the British cargo ship Hyades; interned her crew; and sank her by gunfire. The internees were transferred to Prussia, which released them at Rio de Janeiro.

Prussia reached Rio de Janeiro on 20 August. Five days later she left, supposedly for Santos, which is one day's voyage from Rio de Janeiro. However, she did not reach Santos until 24 September 1914. She was suspected of supplying a German cruiser or auxiliary cruiser during her unexplained month at sea.

== Brazilian service ==
In February 1917, Germany resumed unrestricted submarine warfare. That April and May, German U-boats sank three Brazilian steamships. On 11 April, Brazil terminated diplomatic relations with Germany. On 2 June, Brazil seized 46 German merchant ships that were sheltering in Brazilian ports. They included three Prussia-class ships: Prussia and Palatia in Santos; and Persia in Cabedelo. They were renamed Cabedello; Macao; and Aracaju respectively.

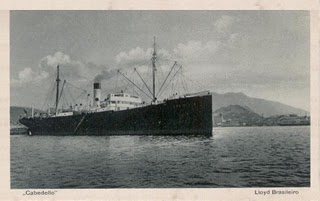
A Lloyd Brasileiro postcard of Cabedello

By 1919, Cabedello was registered in Rio de Janeiro. By 1920, the Government of France had chartered her. Companhia de Navegação Lloyd Brasileiro was managing her by 1923, and owned her by 1927. By 1934, her four-letter call sign was PUAN, and this had superseded her code letters.

On 19 December 1938, Cabedello ran aground in Rio Grande do Norte. She was refloated on or about 8 January 1939.

== Loss ==
In the early part of the Second World War, Brazil was again neutral. However, on 15 and 18 February 1942, German submarines sank two Brazilian merchant ships off the East Coast of the United States: Buarque and Olinda. One member of Buarque's crew was killed.

Just before these two attacks, on 14 February, Cabedello left Philadelphia for Rio de Janeiro via the Antilles with a cargo of coal. Her Master was Captain Pedro Veloso da Silveira. She carried 13 officers; three boatswains; and 37 other crew. She was never seen or heard from again, and all 54 men of her complement were lost, presumed dead. There were no storms on her route, so the Brazilian authorities assumed that Cabedello had been sunk by a submarine, as Buarque and Olinda were confirmed to have been. Brazil considers Cabedello's crew to be victims of war. The names of her crew are included on the Monument to the Dead of World War II in Rio de Janeiro.

Prominent naval historians, including Alberto Santoni, teacher of naval and military history at the University of Pisa, and Jürgen Rohwer of the University of Stuttgart, one of the most renowned World War II naval historians and U-Boat expert, credit the sinking of Cabedello to the Italian submarine Leonardo da Vinci. On 25 February 1942, Da Vinci hit a darkened steamer with two torpedoes, and witnesses her sinking in six minutes in 15°15' N and 52°40' W; the submarine then tried to approach the three lifeboats to question the survivors, but was unable to do so due to the rough weather, and was thus unable to identify its victim. The time and location of this attack would match those of the missing Cabedello, although this is disputed by Brazilian author Roberto Sander.

Another historian alleges that Cabedello was sunk on 14 February: the day she left Philadelphia. That would make her the first Brazilian ship to be sunk by Axis naval action in 1942. Another allegation is that the Italian submarine Luigi Torelli, which attacked two merchant ships off the Guianas on 19 February, sank Cabedello. A third allegation is that the Italian submarine Comandante Cappellini sank her.

== Bibliography ==
- Cinquini, José Carlos Viana (2008). Abrindo Caminho para a Vitória: A Defesa do Brasil na Ação Anti-Submarino na Segunda Guerra Mundial (1942-1945) (in Brazilian Portuguese). Universidade Católica de Santos.
- Haws, Duncan (1980). The Ships of the Hamburg America, Adler and Carr Lines. Merchant Fleets in Profile. Vol. 4. Cambridge: Patrick Stephens Ltd. ISBN 0-85059-397-2.
- Kludas, Arnold; Bischoff, Herbert (1980). Die Schiffe der Hamburg-Amerika Linie (in German). Vol. 2: 1907–1926. Herford: Koehlers Verlaggesellschaft. ISBN 3-7822-0222-8.
- Lloyd's Register of Shipping. Vol. I.–Steamers. London: Lloyd's Register of Shipping. 1914 – via Internet Archive.
- Lloyd's Register of Shipping. Vol. II.–Steamers. London: Lloyd's Register of Shipping. 1919 – via Internet Archive.
- Lloyd's Register of Shipping. Vol. II.–Steamers. London: Lloyd's Register of Shipping. 1920 – via Internet Archive.
- Lloyd's Register of Shipping. Vol. II.–Steamers and Motor Vessels. London: Lloyd's Register of Shipping. 1923 – via Internet Archive.
- Lloyd's Register of Shipping. Vol. II.–Steamers and Motorships. London: Lloyd's Register of Shipping. 1927 – via Internet Archive.
- Lloyd's Register of Shipping (PDF). Vol. II.–Steamers and Motorships of 300 tons gross and over. London: Lloyd's Register of Shipping. 1934 – via Southampton City Council.
- Lloyd's Register of Shipping. Vol. Steamers and Motorships of 300 tons gross and over, Steamers and Motorships under 300 tons, trawlers, tugs, dredgers, &c., Sailing Vessels, list of ship owners, &c. London: Lloyd's Register of Shipping. 1946 – via Internet Archive.
- The Marconi Press Agency Ltd (1918). The Year Book of Wireless Telegraphy and Telephony. London: The Wireless Press, Ltd.
- Register Book. Vol. I. Register of Ships. London: Lloyd's Register of Shipping. 1959 – via Internet Archive.
- Register Book. Vol. I. Register of Ships. London: Lloyd's Register of Shipping. 1965.
- Sander, Roberto (2007). O Brasil na mira de Hitler: a história do afundamento de navios brasileiros pelos nazistas (in Brazilian Portuguese). Rio de Janeiro: Objetiva.
