= German submarine U-340 =

German World War II submarine

History

Nazi Germany
- Name: U-340
- Ordered: 17 December 1940
- Builder: Nordseewerke, Emden
- Yard number: 212
- Laid down: 1 October 1941
- Launched: 20 August 1942
- Commissioned: 16 October 1942
- Fate: Sunk on 2 November 1943

General characteristics
- Class & type: Type VIIC submarine
- Displacement: 769 tonnes (757 long tons) surfaced; 871 t (857 long tons) submerged
- Length: 67.10 m (220 ft 2 in) o/a; 50.50 m (165 ft 8 in) pressure hull
- Beam: 6.20 m (20 ft 4 in) o/a; 4.70 m (15 ft 5 in) pressure hull
- Height: 9.60 m (31 ft 6 in)
- Draught: 4.74 m (15 ft 7 in)
- Installed power: 2,800–3,200 PS (2,100–2,400 kW; 2,800–3,200 bhp) (diesels); 750 PS (550 kW; 740 shp) (electric)
- Propulsion: 2 shafts; 2 × diesel engines; 2 × electric motors
- Speed: 17.7 knots (32.8 km/h; 20.4 mph) surfaced; 7.6 knots (14.1 km/h; 8.7 mph) submerged
- Range: 8,500 nmi (15,700 km; 9,800 mi) at 10 knots (19 km/h; 12 mph) surfaced; 80 nmi (150 km; 92 mi) at 4 knots (7.4 km/h; 4.6 mph) submerged
- Test depth: 230 m (750 ft); Crush depth: 250–295 m (820–968 ft)
- Complement: 4 officers, 40–56 enlisted
- Armament: 5 × 53.3 cm (21 in) torpedo tubes (four bow, one stern); 14 × torpedoes or 26 TMA mines; 1 × 8.8 cm (3.46 in) deck gun (220 rounds); 2 × twin 2 cm (0.79 in) C/30 anti-aircraft guns

Service record
- Part of: 8th U-boat Flotilla; 16 October 1942 – 30 April 1943; 6th U-boat Flotilla; 1 May – 2 November 1943
- Identification codes: M 49 695
- Commanders: Oblt.z.S. Hans-Joachim Klaus; 16 October 1942 – 2 November 1943
- Operations: 3 patrols: 1st patrol: 29 April – 31 May 1943; 2nd patrol: 6 July – 2 September 1943; 3rd patrol: 17 October – 2 November 1943
- Victories: None

German submarine U-340 was a Type VIIC U-boat of Nazi Germany's Kriegsmarine during World War II.

The submarine was laid down on 1 October 1941 at the Nordseewerke yard at Emden, launched on 20 August 1942, and commissioned on 16 October 1942 under the command of Oberleutnant zur See Hans-Joachim Klaus. U-340 served with the 8th U-boat Flotilla, for training and then with the 6th U-boat Flotilla for operational service from 1 May to 2 November 1943.

== Design ==
German Type VIIC submarines were preceded by the shorter Type VIIB submarines. U-340 had a displacement of 769 tonnes (757 long tons) when at the surface and 871 tonnes (857 long tons) while submerged. She had a total length of 67.10 m (220 ft 2 in), a pressure hull length of 50.50 m (165 ft 8 in), a beam of 6.20 m (20 ft 4 in), a height of 9.60 m (31 ft 6 in), and a draught of 4.74 m (15 ft 7 in). The submarine was powered by two Germaniawerft F46 four-stroke, six-cylinder supercharged diesel engines producing a total of 2,800 to 3,200 metric horsepower (2,060 to 2,350 kW; 2,760 to 3,160 shp) for use while surfaced, two AEG GU 460/8–27 double-acting electric motors producing a total of 750 metric horsepower (550 kW; 740 shp) for use while submerged. She had two shafts and two 1.23 m (4 ft) propellers. The boat was capable of operating at depths of up to 230 metres (750 ft).

The submarine had a maximum surface speed of 17.7 knots (32.8 km/h; 20.4 mph) and a maximum submerged speed of 7.6 knots (14.1 km/h; 8.7 mph). When submerged, the boat could operate for 80 nautical miles (150 km; 92 mi) at 4 knots (7.4 km/h; 4.6 mph); when surfaced, she could travel 8,500 nautical miles (15,700 km; 9,800 mi) at 10 knots (19 km/h; 12 mph). U-340 was fitted with five 53.3 cm (21 in) torpedo tubes (four fitted at the bow and one at the stern), fourteen torpedoes, one 8.8 cm (3.46 in) SK C/35 naval gun, 220 rounds, and two twin 2 cm (0.79 in) C/30 anti-aircraft guns. The boat had a complement of between forty-four and sixty.

== Service history ==
=== First patrol ===
U-340 sailed from Kiel on 29 April 1943, and out into the Atlantic to the waters south-east of Cape Farewell, Greenland, before returning to Bordeaux on 31 May, after 33 days at sea with no successes.

=== Second patrol ===
U-340's next patrol took her from Bordeaux on 6 July 1943, south to the coast of West Africa. On 25 August she rescued five Luftwaffe airmen off the coast of Spain, and was attacked by an aircraft shortly afterwards, suffering some damage; several men were wounded. She returned to Saint-Nazaire on 2 September.

=== Third patrol ===
U-340's third and final patrol began on 17 October 1943, sailing from Saint-Nazaire south to the Strait of Gibraltar. There she was sunk on 2 November 1943, near Tangier at position 35°33′N 6°37′W, by depth charges from the sloop HMS Fleetwood, the destroyers HMS Active and Witherington and a Liberator bomber of No. 179 Squadron RAF. One of U-340's crew was killed and 48 survived the attack.

== See also ==
- Mediterranean U-boat Campaign (World War II)

== Bibliography ==
- Busch, Rainer; Röll, Hans-Joachim (1999). German U-boat commanders of World War II : a biographical dictionary. Translated by Brooks, Geoffrey. London, Annapolis, Md: Greenhill Books, Naval Institute Press. ISBN 1-55750-186-6.
- Busch, Rainer; Röll, Hans-Joachim (1999). Deutsche U-Boot-Verluste von September 1939 bis Mai 1945 [German U-boat losses from September 1939 to May 1945]. Der U-Boot-Krieg (in German). Vol. IV. Hamburg, Berlin, Bonn: Mittler. ISBN 3-8132-0514-2.
- Gröner, Erich; Jung, Dieter; Maass, Martin (1991). U-boats and Mine Warfare Vessels. German Warships 1815–1945. Vol. 2. Translated by Thomas, Keith; Magowan, Rachel. London: Conway Maritime Press. ISBN 0-85177-593-4.
- Bishop, Chris (2006). Kriegsmarine U-Boats, 1939-45. London: Amber Books. ISBN 978-1-904687-96-2.
- Kemp, Paul (1999). U-Boats Destroyed - German Submarine Losses in the World Wars. London: Arms & Armour. ISBN 1-85409-515-3.
