= HMS Witherington =

Destroyer of the Royal Navy

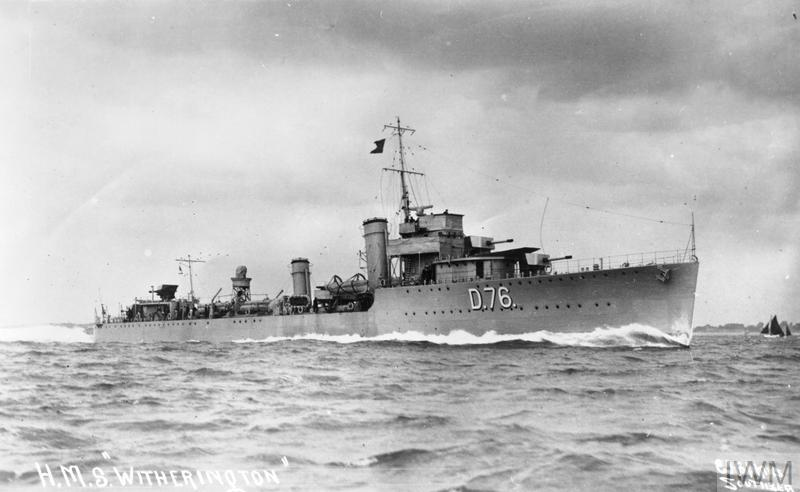
- Destroyer HMS Witherington in 1919

History

United Kingdom
- Name: HMS Witherington
- Ordered: April 1918
- Builder: James Samuel White & Co Ltd
- Laid down: 27 September 1918
- Launched: 16 January 1919
- Commissioned: 10 October 1919
- Out of service: To reserve after May 1945
- Stricken: On disposal list after September 1945
- Identification: Pennant number: D76 and I76
- Motto: "I Will Not Fail"
- Honours and awards: Atlantic 1939-44; Norway 1940; English Channel 1940
- Fate: Sold for scrap 20 March 1947; Wrecked 29 April 1947
- Badge: On a Field Black, A sinister Leg Gold couped at the Knee Red

General characteristics
- Class & type: Admiralty modified W-class destroyer
- Displacement: 1,140 tons standard, 1,550 tons full
- Length: 300 ft o/a, 312 ft p/p
- Beam: 29.5 feet (9.0 m)
- Draught: 9 feet (2.7 m), 11.25 feet (3.43 m) under full load
- Installed power: 27,000 shp
- Propulsion: White-Foster water-tube boilers; Brown-Curtis geared steam turbines; 2 shafts
- Speed: 34 kn
- Range: 320-370 tons oil; 3,500 nmi at 15 kn; 900 nmi at 32 kn
- Complement: 127
- Armament: 4 × BL 4.7 in (120-mm) Mk.I guns, mount P Mk.I; 2 × QF 2 pdr Mk.II "pom-pom" (40 mm L/39); 6 × 21-inch torpedo tubes

General characteristics SRE conversion
- Complement: 134
- Sensors & processing systems: Type 271 target indication radar
- Armament: 3 × BL 4.7 in (120mm) Mk.I L/45 guns; 1 × QF 12 pounder 12 cwt naval gun; 2 × QF 2 pdr Mk.II "pom-pom" (40 mm L/39); 3 × 21-inch torpedo tubes (one triple mount); 2 × depth charge racks

Service record
- Part of: 3rd Destroyer Flotilla – 1919; Reserve at Rosyth – 1930; 15th Destroyer Flotilla – 1939
- Operations: Nanking Incident 1927; World War II 1939 to 1945
- Victories: U-340 – 1 Nov 1943

HMS Witherington was an Admiralty modified W-class destroyer built for the Royal Navy. She was one of four destroyers ordered in April 1918 from James Samuel White & Co Ltd. under the 14th Order for Destroyers of the Emergency War Program of 1917–18. She was the first Royal Navy ship to carry this name.

The City of Durham adopted HMS Witherington following a successful Warship Week National Savings campaign in February 1942.

== Construction ==
Witherington's keel was laid on 27 September 1918 at the James Samuel White & Co. Ltd. Shipyard in Cowes, Isle of Wight. She was launched on 16 January 1919. She was 300 feet overall (312 ft between the perpendiculars) in length with a beam of 29.5 feet. Her mean draught was 9 feet, and would reach 11.25 feet under full load. She had a displacement of 1,140 tons standard and up to 1,550 full load.

She was propelled by three White-Foster type water tube boilers powering Curtis-Brown geared steam turbines developing 27,000 SHP driving two screws for a maximum designed speed of 34 knots. She was oil-fired and had a bunkerage of 320 to 370 tons. This gave a range of between 3500 nautical miles at 15 knots and 900 nautical miles at 32 knots.

She shipped four BL 4.7 in (120-mm) Mk.I guns, mount P Mk.I naval guns in four single centre-line turrets. The turrets were disposed as two forward and two aft in super imposed firing positions. She also carried two QF 2 pdr Mk.II "pom-pom" (40 mm L/39) mounted abeam between funnels. Abaft of the second funnel, she carried six 21-inch torpedo tubes in two triple mounts on the centre-line.

== Inter-War years ==
Witherington was commissioned into the Royal Navy on 10 October 1919 with pennant number D76. After commissioning she was assigned to the 3rd Destroyer Flotilla of the Atlantic Fleet. The flotilla served in Home waters from May 1920 to July 1923 when the Flotilla was transferred to the Mediterranean Fleet. She was transferred to China Station in 1926.

Also, in 1926 she carried the last Shah of Persia, Ahmad Shah Qajar, into exile, as the old country of Persia was replaced by the country of Iran. During the Nanking Incident in March 1927, she helped rescue foreign nationals from the Nanking region of China.

In the early 1930s she underwent a refit and was laid-up in Maintenance Reserve at Rosyth as more modern destroyers came into service. She was reactivated manned by Reservists for a Royal Review at Weymouth in August 1939. With war looming she was retained in service and brought to war readiness.

== Second World War ==
=== Early operations ===
In September 1939 the ship was allocated to the 15th Destroyer Flotilla based at Rosyth (changed to Liverpool in 1940) in Western Approaches Command for convoy defence. Up to April 1940 she was employed in the North West Approaches area providing local escort for convoys leaving Liverpool (OB series) to a dispersal point in the Atlantic approximately 750 nautical miles west of Lands End. Periodically an OA (sailing from Southend)series convoy would sail and join up with the OB series. The merged convoy would change to an OG series (UK to Gibraltar). During this period she escorted 20 convoys, for a total of 436 ships with total losses of 3 ships (2 sunk by U-boats and 1 due to collision).

In April 1940 she was detached to Scapa Flow after the German invasion of Norway. From 11 April to 15 April she escorted military convoy NP001 to Narvik then on 24 April she escorted military TM001/1. She provided local escort for the arrival at Clyde for TC004 with two troopships carrying 2,591 troops. At the end of May her pennant number was changed to I76 for visual signalling purposes. In June she escorted Group 1 (named Hebrew) of the evacuation of Norway from Scapa to the Clyde.

In July 1940 she was returned to the Western Approaches for convoy defence and was mainly employed in the North-West Approach sector as a local escort until February 1942. During this time she escorted 13 mercantile convoys. On 11 March 1941, she was beached in Portsmouth after sustaining damage from a Luftwaffe air raid, to be later repaired and returned to service.

=== SRE Conversion ===
In late February 1942 she was withdrawn for conversion to a short-range escort (SRE). To augment the earlier changes, the replacement of the after bank of torpedo tubes with a single QF 12 pounder 12 cwt naval gun and the landing of 'Y' gun for additional space for depth charge gear and stowage, a Type 271 centimetric target indication radar was added on the bridge and a Type 286P air warning radar was installed on the main mast.

=== Western Approaches Command ===
Upon completion of the conversion, Witherington was redeployed in the Western Approaches. During March she was part of the escort force of Convoy Halifax Inbound (HX) 229. The convoy was under sustained attack during the night of 16–17 March by five U-boats of the Raubgraf Group, two U-boats of the Sturmer Group and one U-boat transiting to home port. There was no rescue ship assigned to HX229, therefore the escorts were rescuing the survivors of the ten merchant ships that were sunk. Only two escorts were constantly with the convoy further exposing the convoy to attack.

At the end of June 1943 she was transferred to the Mediterranean-based out of Alexandria in support of follow on convoys for the Allied invasion of Sicily. In November she was deployed to Gibraltar for Atlantic Convoy Defence.

On 1 November she took part in the sinking of the German submarine U-340 with HMS Active, HMS Fleetwood and two Vickers Wellington aircraft of No. 179 Squadron RAF at position 35^{o}33'N, 06^{o}37'W. She was deployed in the South-West Approaches out of Gibraltar throughout 1944.

She was deployed in the South-West Approaches out of Gibraltar throughout 1944.

In 1945 she was deployed to the English Channel area to counter the threat of snorkel equipped U-Boats being concentrated or convoy formation areas. She remained in this deployment until VE-Day.

== Post war ==
=== Disposition ===
Witherington was paid off into reserve after VE-Day. She was placed on the disposal list after VJ-Day. On 20 March 1947 she was sold to Metal Industries for breaking up. On 29 April while under tow to the breakers yard at Charlestown near Rosyth she parted the tow and was wrecked off the mouth of the Tyne in a gale.

=== Place of honour ===
After the ship was sold for scrap, her ship's bell was retrieved and presented to the City of Durham. The bell, along with a plaque displaying the ship's crest, were mounted in the City Council Chambers.

== Bibliography ==
- Campbell, John (1985). Naval Weapons of World War II. Annapolis, Maryland: Naval Institute Press. ISBN 0-87021-459-4.
- Chesneau, Roger, ed. (1980). Conway's All the World's Fighting Ships 1922–1946. Greenwich, UK: Conway Maritime Press. ISBN 0-85177-146-7.
- Colledge, J. J.; Warlow, Ben (2006) [1969]. Ships of the Royal Navy: The Complete Record of All Fighting Ships of the Royal Navy from the 15th Century to the Present (3rd Rev ed.). London: Chatham Publishing. ISBN 978-1-86176-281-8. OCLC 67375475.
- Cocker, Maurice. Destroyers of the Royal Navy, 1893–1981. Ian Allan. ISBN 0-7110-1075-7.
- Friedman, Norman (2009). British Destroyers From Earliest Days to the Second World War. Annapolis, Maryland: Naval Institute Press. ISBN 978-1-59114-081-8.
- Gardiner, Robert & Gray, Randal, eds. (1985). Conway's All the World's Fighting Ships 1906–1921. Annapolis, Maryland: Naval Institute Press. ISBN 0-85177-245-5.
- Lenton, H. T. (1998). British & Empire Warships of the Second World War. Annapolis, Maryland: Naval Institute Press. ISBN 1-55750-048-7.
- March, Edgar J. (1966). British Destroyers: A History of Development, 1892–1953; Drawn by Admiralty Permission From Official Records & Returns, Ships' Covers & Building Plans. London: Seeley Service. OCLC 164893555.
- Preston, Antony (1971). 'V & W' Class Destroyers 1917–1945. London: Macdonald. OCLC 464542895.
- Raven, Alan & Roberts, John (1979). 'V' and 'W' Class Destroyers. Man o'War. Vol. 2. London: Arms & Armour. ISBN 0-85368-233-X.
- Rohwer, Jürgen (2005). Chronology of the War at Sea 1939–1945: The Naval History of World War Two (Third Revised ed.). Annapolis, Maryland: Naval Institute Press. ISBN 1-59114-119-2.
- Whinney, Bob (2000). The U-boat Peril: A Fight for Survival. Cassell. ISBN 0-304-35132-6.
- Whitley, M. J. (1988). Destroyers of World War 2. Annapolis, Maryland: Naval Institute Press. ISBN 0-87021-326-1.
- Winser, John de D. (1999). B.E.F. Ships Before, At and After Dunkirk. Gravesend, Kent: World Ship Society. ISBN 0-905617-91-6.
- Hitler's U-Boat War The Hunters 1939–1942
- Hitler's U-Boat War The Hunted 1942–1945
- Jane's Fighting Ships for 1919
