= HMS Fleetwood (U47) =

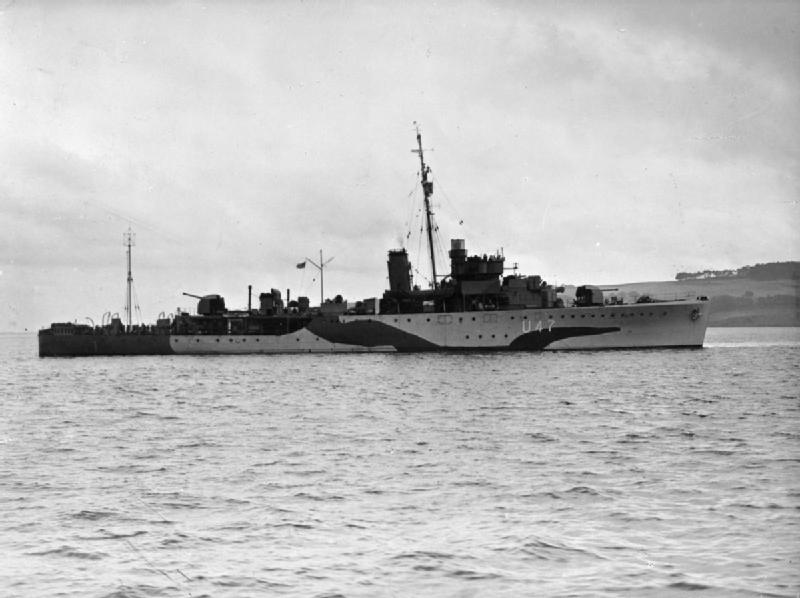
- Fleetwood in 1944

History

United Kingdom
- Name: HMS Fleetwood
- Ordered: 1 March 1935
- Builder: Devonport Dockyard
- Laid down: 14 August 1935
- Launched: 24 March 1936
- Completed: 19 November 1936
- Fate: Scrapped 1959

General characteristics
- Class & type: Grimsby-class sloop
- Displacement: 990 long tons (1,010 t) standard
- Length: 266 ft 3 in (81.15 m) o/a
- Beam: 36 ft (11.0 m)
- Draught: 9 ft 6 in (2.90 m) (full load)
- Propulsion: Two Admiralty 3-drum water-tube boilers; Parsons geared steam turbines; Two shafts; 2,000 shp (1,500 kW)
- Speed: 16.5 kn (30.6 km/h; 19.0 mph)
- Range: 6,000 nmi (11,000 km; 6,900 mi) at 10 kn (19 km/h; 12 mph)
- Complement: 100
- Armament: 4 × 4 inch (102 mm) Mark V guns (2 twin mounts); 4 × 3-pounder guns; 1 × Vickers .50 machine gun (1 quadruple mount)

HMS Fleetwood was a Grimsby-class sloop of the Royal Navy. Built at Devonport Dockyard in the 1930s, Fleetwood was launched in March 1936 and commissioned in November that year. She served in the Red Sea until the outbreak of the Second World War. Fleetwood served as a convoy escort during the war, which she survived, and sank the German submarines U-528 and U-340. Post-war, the ship served as a radar training ship, remaining in use until 1959, when she was scrapped.

== Construction and design ==
HMS Fleetwood was one of two Grimsby-class sloops constructed under the 1934 construction programme for the Royal Navy. She was ordered from Devonport Dockyard on 1 March 1935. Two Grimsby-class sloops had been ordered under each of the 1931, 1932 and 1933 programmes, giving a total of eight Grimsby-class ships built for the Royal Navy. Four more were built for Australia and one for India. The Grimsby class, while based on the previous Shoreham class, was intended to be a more capable escort vessel than previous sloops, and carried a more powerful armament.

Fleetwood was 266 feet 3 inches (81.15 m) long overall, with a beam of 36 feet (10.97 m) and a draught of 9 feet 6 inches (2.90 m) at deep load. Displacement was 990 long tons (1,010 t) standard, and 1,355 long tons (1,377 t) full load. The ship was powered by two geared steam turbines driving two shafts, fed by two Admiralty 3-drum boilers. This machinery produced 2,000 shaft horsepower (1,500 kW) and could propel the ship to a speed of 16.5 knots (30.6 km/h; 19.0 mph). The ship had a range of 6,000 nautical miles (11,000 km; 6,900 mi) at 10 knots (19 km/h; 12 mph).

While previous ships of the class had been built with a gun armament of 4.7-inch (120 mm) low-angle guns, designed for use against surface targets, by 1934 it was realised that attack from the air posed a significant risk to shipping, and it was decided to fit the sloops of the 1934 programme with an improved anti-aircraft armament. Fleetwood was selected to carry the prototype fitting of the new QF 4 inch Mk XVI naval gun, carrying two twin mounts with an appropriate fire-control system. This was supplemented by a quadruple .50 in (12.7 mm) Vickers anti-aircraft machine gun mount. Four 3-pounder saluting guns completed the ship's gun armament. The initial anti-submarine armament consisted of two depth charge throwers and two rails, with a loadout of 40 depth charges.

Fleetwood was laid down on 14 August 1935, launched on 24 March 1936 and completed on 19 November 1936.

=== Modifications ===
A second quadruple 0.50 in machine gun mount was fitted in 1938. The close-in anti-aircraft armament was further supplemented in 1941, when three Oerlikon 20 mm cannon were added, while a further three Oerlikons replaced the multiple machine guns in 1942, while the saluting guns were removed during the war. The ship's depth charge loading increased to 60–90 during the war, while a Hedgehog anti-submarine mortar was fitted in 1943.

== Service ==
After commissioning, Fleetwood served as trials ship for the new armament, and then visited Gibraltar, Tangier and Cartagena, Spain during February–March 1937. She then carried out a number of visits around the coast of Britain, including her namesake town of Fleetwood and carried out more trials work before leaving for her station on the Red Sea, arriving at Aden on 27 March 1938.

Fleetwood was recalled to Home waters following the outbreak of the Second World War, arriving at Portland on 11 October 1939 and was tasked with providing escort to convoys along the East coast of Britain. In April 1940, Germany invaded Norway, with Fleetwood attached to the Home Fleet. She provided anti-aircraft cover for landings at Åndalsnes and Molde, and when the sloop Pelican was damaged by German bombs, Fleetwood towed the damaged ship back to Lerwick in Shetland. She then returned to Romsdalsfjord, relieving the damaged sloop Black Swan on 28 April. On 29 April she was near missed by a German bomb, which caused little damage, and was herself relieved on 30 April by the sloop Auckland and the cruiser Calcutta, having fired all her anti-aircraft ammunition. Fleetwood evacuated 340 troops on her return to Britain. On 11–12 May 1940 Fleetwood helped to land troops at Mo i Rana, and came under heavy air attack. On 27 May 1940, Fleetwood helped escort the badly damaged destroyer Eskimo, which had her bow blown off at the Second Battle of Narvik, from Harstad back to Britain.

Following the end of operations off Norway, Fleetwood returned to East coast convoy duties, which continued until January 1941 when she was transferred to Londonderry for escort duties in the Atlantic. She remained operating out of Londonderry until June 1941 when she moved to Newfoundland. Fleetwood returned to Britain in August 1941 when she was refitted at Middlesbrough, where radar was fitted and her anti-aircraft armament improved. On completion of the refit in September that year, she joined the 44th Escort Group based at Londonderry, escorting convoys to and from Freetown, Sierra Leone.

Fleetwood collided with the tanker Oil Reliance on 2 June 1942 while escorting the convoy OS30 to Freetown. She was under repair and undergoing a refit at Liverpool until August that year. Fleetwood then returned to service on the Freetown route. In November that year, Fleetwood was employed escorting convoys to and from North Africa following Operation Torch, the Anglo-American landings in French North Africa, and in December joined the 43rd Escort Group based at Gibraltar for escort duties in the Western Mediterranean.

In April 1943, Fleetwood returned to Londonderry, joining the 39th Escort group on the Freetown route. On 11 May 1943, Fleetwood was part of the escort of Sierra Leone-bound convoy OS47, when a Handley Page Halifax patrol aircraft of 58 Squadron RAF spotted the German submarine U-528, which was returning to France after being damaged by a previous air attack, and attacked with depth charges. Fleetwood was sent from the convoy to follow up the air attack, and carried out a series of depth charge attacks on the submarine, forcing U-528 to surface, where she was shelled by Fleetwood and the corvette Mignonette, forcing the submarine's crew to scuttle the submarine and abandon ship. Fleetwood rescued 39 of U-528's crew, including her commanding officer, while Mignonette picked up 6 more and 11 men were killed.

Fleetwood was refitted at Dundee in July–August 1943, when she was fitted with updated radar and with HF/DF gear. In October 1943 she joined the 41st Escort Group based at Gibraltar. On the early morning of 1 November 1943 a Vickers Wellington of 179 Squadron RAF attacked the German submarine U-340 in the mouth of the Strait of Gibraltar, damaging the submarine. Later that day, U-340 was located by Fleetwood and the destroyers Active and Witherington, who attacked with depth charges, further damaging the submarine, which scuttled herself later that day. The crew of the submarine were rescued by a Spanish fishing trawler, but were then captured by Fleetwood.

On 17 November 1943, Fleetwood collided with the US patrol boat PC-473, and then with a jetty. Fleetwood was badly damaged, and was under repair at Gibraltar until the end of March 1944. She then joined the 41st Escort Group, escorting convoys along the Mediterranean until entering refit at Haifa in September 1944. In October Fleetwood joined the 50th Escort Flotilla bases at Alexandria for escort duties in the Eastern Mediterranean, before returning to British waters at the end of the year. She continued to serve with Portsmouth Command until the end of the war in Europe.

On 4 August 1945 Fleetwood was laid up in reserve at Hartlepool. She was selected to serve as a Radar Training ship attached to the ASRE, and was refitted at Portsmouth, her armament being removed and her bridge enlarged to give increased accommodation. She was refitted again in 1950, and took part in the Fleet review for the Coronation of Queen Elizabeth II on 15 June 1953. Fleetwood was paid off into reserve at Portsmouth in December 1958 and was sold for scrap in 1959, leaving Portsmouth for breaking up at C.W. Dorkings yard at Gateshead on 6 December 1959.

== Pennant number ==
Note: The Pennant number was not painted on the ship's side until September 1939.

Pennant number	From	To
L47	1935	April 1940
U47	April 1940	1947
F47	1947	1958
