= No. 58 Squadron RAF =

Defunct flying squadron of the Royal Air Force

No. 58 Squadron
- Active: 8 June 1916 – 1 April 1918 (RFC); 1 April 1918 – 1 Feb 1920 (RAF); 1 April 1924 – 25 May 1945; 1 Oct 1946 – 1 September 1970; 1 August 1973 – 4 June 1976
- Country: United Kingdom
- Branch: Royal Air Force
- Mottos: Latin: Alis nocturnis ("On the wings of the night")
- Battle honours: Western Front, 1918: Somme, 1918: Hindenburg Line: France & Low Countries, 1940: Atlantic, 1939–45: Norway 1940: Fortress Europe, 1940–41: Ruhr, 1940–41: Berlin, 1940–41: German Ports, 1940–41: Biscay Ports, 1941–42: Biscay 1942–44: Arctic, 1942–43: Normandy, 1944: Baltic 1944–45:

Commanders
- Notable commanders: "Bomber" Harris

Insignia
- Badge: An owl on a branch.
- Squadron codes: BW (Nov 1938 – Sep 1939); GE (Sep 1939 – Apr 1943); BY (Apr 1943 – May 1945); OT (Oct 1946 – Oct 1951)

No. 58 Squadron was a squadron of the Royal Air Force (RAF). For much of its service history in the First and Second World Wars, it operated as a bomber squadron. In the later stages of the Second World War, it was part of Coastal Command and was engaged in anti-submarine patrols.

== History ==
=== First World War ===
No. 58 Squadron was first formed during the First World War at Cramlington, Northumberland, on 8 June 1916 as a squadron of the Royal Flying Corps from a nucleus split off from the Home defence 36 Squadron, equipped with Royal Aircraft Factory B.E.2c and B.E.2e aircraft and serving as an advanced training unit.

The squadron converted to Royal Aircraft Factory F.E.2bs in the night bombing role at Dover in December 1917 and prepared for deployment overseas, moving to France on 10 January 1918, and flying its first operational mission, a bombing attack on an airfield at Rumbeke on the night of 2/3 February 1918. The squadron attacked German road and railway targets during the German spring offensive in March–April 1918 to disrupt the German advance. In August 1918, the squadron flew nightbombing missions in support of the Allied offensive at the Second Battle of Bapaume. In September 1918 the squadron replaced its F.E.2s with the much larger twin-engine Handley Page O/400, although its airfield at Alquines was not ideal for the large bomber, having poor operating surfaces and awkward approaches. It flew its first mission with the O/400 on the night of 20–21 September, and discarded its last F.E.2s on 3 October. By the end of the war the squadron had dropped 247 tons of bombs and fired over 400,000 rounds of ammunition while strafing ground targets. In 1919 the squadron moved to Egypt, with the move completed by 2 July. It started to reequip with Vickers Vimy bombers, but was renumbered as No. 70 Squadron before it disposed of all its O/400s.

=== Between the wars ===
No. 58 Squadron was reformed on 1 April 1924 as a heavy bomber unit equipped with the Vimy at RAF Worthy Down on training duties. From December 1924, it replaced its Vimys with Vickers Virginia bombers and in 1925 it was commanded by Squadron Leader Arthur Harris, later Air Marshal "Bomber" Harris. The squadron, still equipped with the Virginia, moved to RAF Upper Heyford on 13 January 1936 and to RAF Driffield on 31 August that year. Steps finally began to be taken to replace its obsolete Virginia biplanes in February 1937 when it received a few Avro Ansons to prepare its crews for more modern monoplanes with retractable undercarriages. It moved to RAF Boscombe Down on 24 March 1937 and began to re-equip with Armstrong Whitworth Whitleys in October that year (although shortages of Whitleys resulted in it temporarily receiving a few Handley Page Heyfords in April 1939.

=== Second World War ===
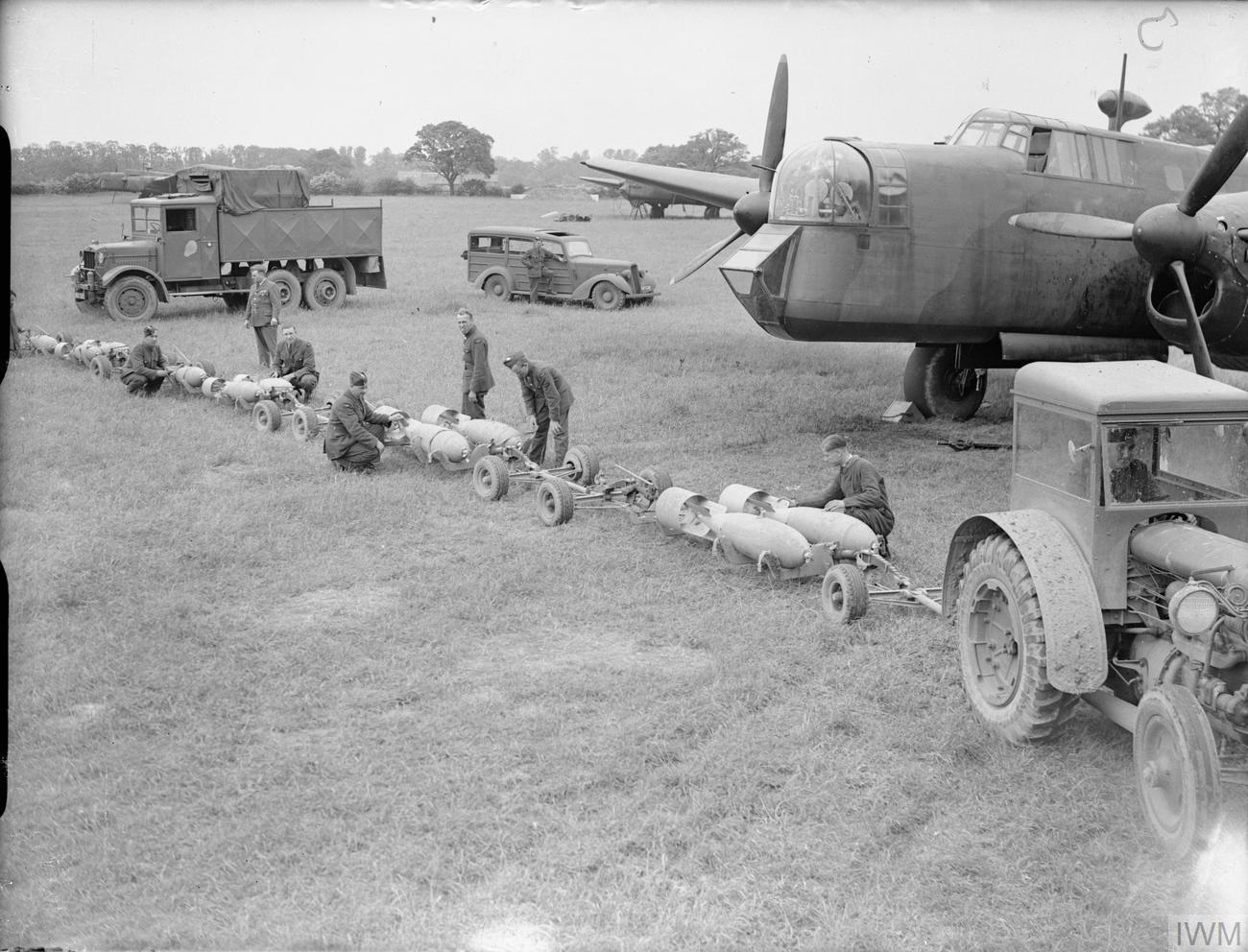
Armourers prepare 500-lb GP bombs for Armstrong Whitworth Whitley of 58 Squadron at RAF Linton-on-Ouse

At the start of the Second World War 58 Squadron was based at RAF Linton-on-Ouse flying Whitley bombers as part of No. 4 Group RAF in RAF Bomber Command, flying its first mission of the war, a leaflet raid on the Ruhr in Germany, on the night of 3/4 September 1939. From October 1939 until February 1940 it was based at RAF Boscombe Down attached to Coastal Command carrying out convoy escort patrols. The squadron then returned in February 1940 to Linton-on-Ouse as part of Bomber Command and remained there for the next two years, undertaking its first bombing raid on the night of 18/19 April 1940, when three Whitleys set out to attack Fornebu airfield, Oslo, with one aborting and two attacking the target. Up until April 1942, after just over two years with Bomber Command, the squadron had flown a total of 1,757 sorties in 227 operations (219 bombing raids and 8 leaflet raids), losing 49 aircraft on operations. (Note: Halley states the transfer occurred on 8 April while Rawlings states 5 April.)

With effect from April 1942, the squadron transferred to Coastal Command, and was based at RAF St Eval flying anti-submarine patrols over the Western Approaches as part of No. 19 Group RAF. On 23 June 1942, a Whitley of 58 Squadron attacked the German submarine U-753 in the Bay of Biscay, badly damaging the submarine. At the end of August 1942 the squadron moved to RAF Stornoway in the Western Isles. On 15 September 1942 a 58 Squadron Whitley sank the German submarine U-261 near the Rosemary Bankwest of Scotland. In December 1942, the squadron moved to RAF Holmsley South in Hampshire, converting to the Handley Page Halifax in January 1943.

On 11 May 1943, a Halifax of 58 Squadron spotted the German submarine U-528 in the Bay of Biscay and attacked with depth charges. The submarine was subsequently attacked by the sloop Fleetwood and sunk, with the Halifax and Fleetwood being jointly credited with sinking the U-boat. On 15 May another 58 Squadron Halifax caught a U-boat on the surface in the Bay of Biscay, sinking U-266.

In October 1944 the squadron switched from anti-submarine duties to anti-shipping duties, carrying out attacks on German shipping off the coast of Norway. It was disbanded on 25 May 1945.

=== Post-war operations ===
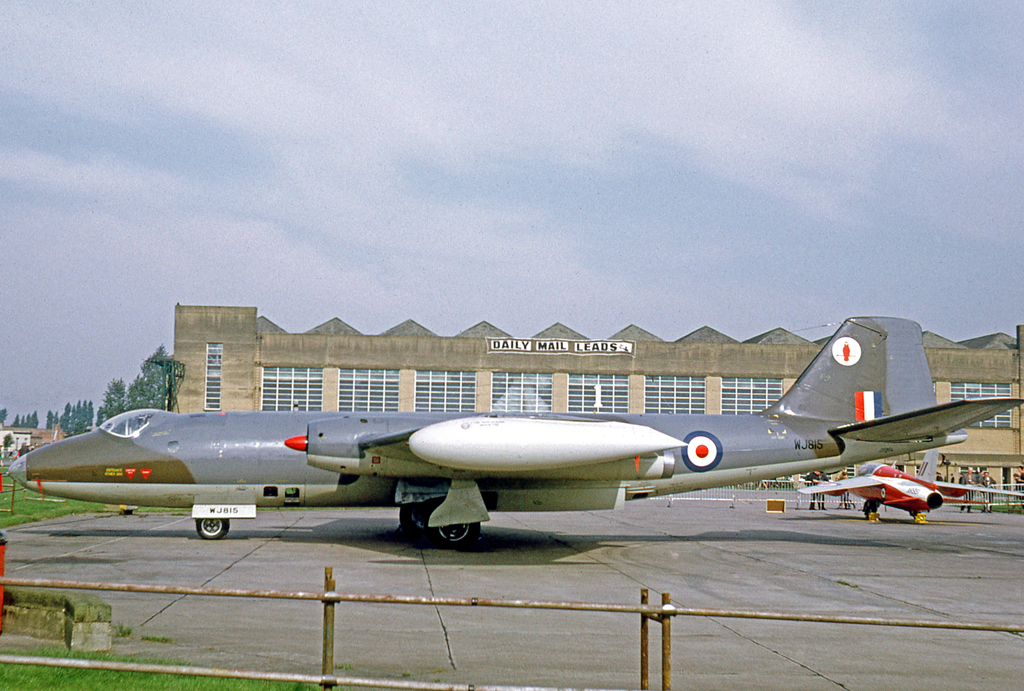
58 Squadron Canberra PR.7 at RAF Finningley in 1969. It wears the Squadron's Owl symbol on its fin tip.

In October 1946, No. 58 Squadron reformed at RAF Benson in the photo-reconnaissance role, mainly operating the De Havilland Mosquito. In March 1953, the squadron moved to RAF Wyton operating Mosquitos. Late in 1953 the squadron was re-equipped with the English Electric Canberra PR.3. In 1953/54, the Canberras made a record breaking flight from Wyton to New Zealand via Egypt, India and Singapore, completing the journey in 24 hours. Two aircraft also made the trip to USA for the 50th anniversary celebration of the Wright brothers' first flight. These were replaced by Canberra PR.7s in 1955 which took part in Operation Grapple, the testing of hydrogen bombs at Christmas Island in the Pacific, and also were deployed to British Honduras to face a threat by Guatemala to overfly the country during an official visit by Princess Margaret.

The Radar Reconnaissance Flight was created by splitting off an element of the squadron on 1 October 1951 while at Benson, it operated the Avro Lincoln, the Handley Page Hastings and the Handley Page Victor until it was disbanded on 1 November 1963 at RAF Gaydon.

During the Suez Crisis, No. 58 Squadron forward deployed to RAF Akrotiri, Cyprus. On 6 November 1956, Canberra PR.7 WH799 departed from Akrotiri to overfly Syria to assess the build up of Soviet equipment in the country. While over Syria, WH799 was intercepted and was shot down by a Gloster Meteor of the Syrian Air Force, killing the navigator while the pilot and spotter both ejected and safely landed in Lebanon. As of 2021, this was the last RAF aircraft shot down in an enemy air-to-air engagement.

The squadron disbanded on 30 September 1970. It was reformed at RAF Wittering in 1973 as a ground-attack training unit equipped with Hawker Hunters before being finally disbanded in 1976.
