= Italian ship Leonardo da Vinci =

Leonardo da Vinci this name has been borne by at least four ships of the Italian Navy and may refer to:

- Italian battleship Leonardo da Vinci, a Conte di Cavour-class battleship launched in 1911 and sunk in 1916.
- Italian submarine Leonardo da Vinci (1939), a Marconi-class submarine launched in 1939 and sunk in 1943.
- Italian submarine Leonardo da Vinci (S 510), a Gato-class submarine launched in 1942 as USS Dace for the United States Navy and transferred in 1955. She was returned in 1972.
- Italian submarine Leonardo da Vinci (S 520), a Sauro-class submarine launched in 1979 and decommissioned in 2010.
