= Berhampore School =

Berhampore Primary School
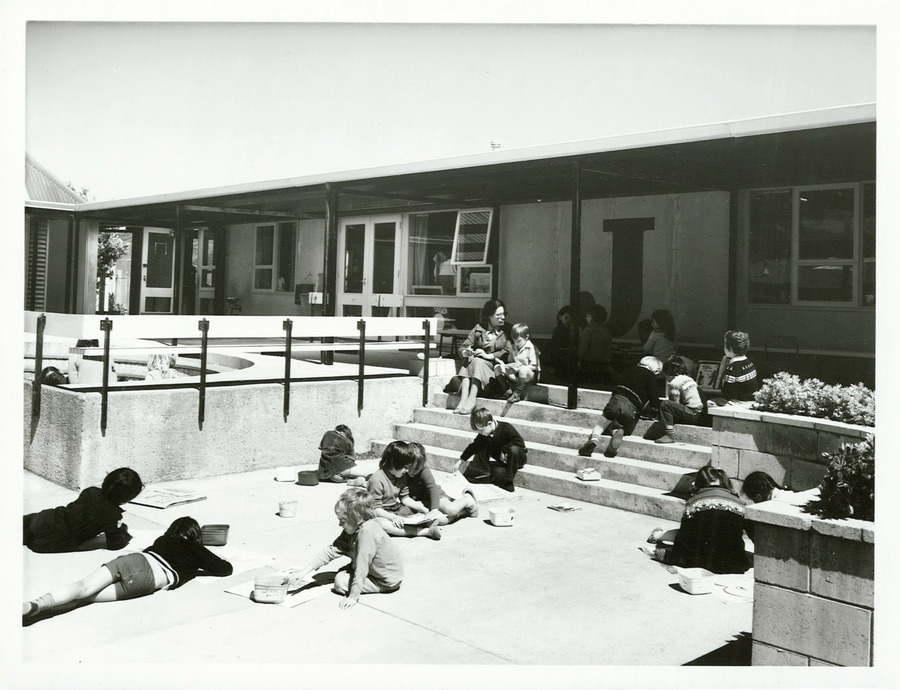

Location
- 105 Britomart Street, Berhampore, Wellington, New Zealand; 41.320941°S 174.773467°E

Information
- Type: State primary school (Year 1-6)
- Motto: Berhampore School is Everyone’s School
- Established: 1915
- Ministry of Education Institution no.: 2808
- Principal: Mark Potter
- Enrolment: 269 (July 2026)
- Socio-economic decile: 7
- Website: berhampore.school.nz

Berhampore Primary School is a state primary school in the city of Wellington, in the Wellington region of New Zealand. The school vision is "Berhampore School is Everyone's School. The school had its centenary celebration in 2015.

== History ==
Berhampore School was opened in 1915. In 1936, New Zealand's first school road patrol was at Berhampore School. It was also Wellington's first open-plan school.

== Pupils ==
- Jim Wilson (1915–2001), chief librarian of the General Assembly Library (1955–1971)
