= HMS Active (H14) =

A-class destroyer

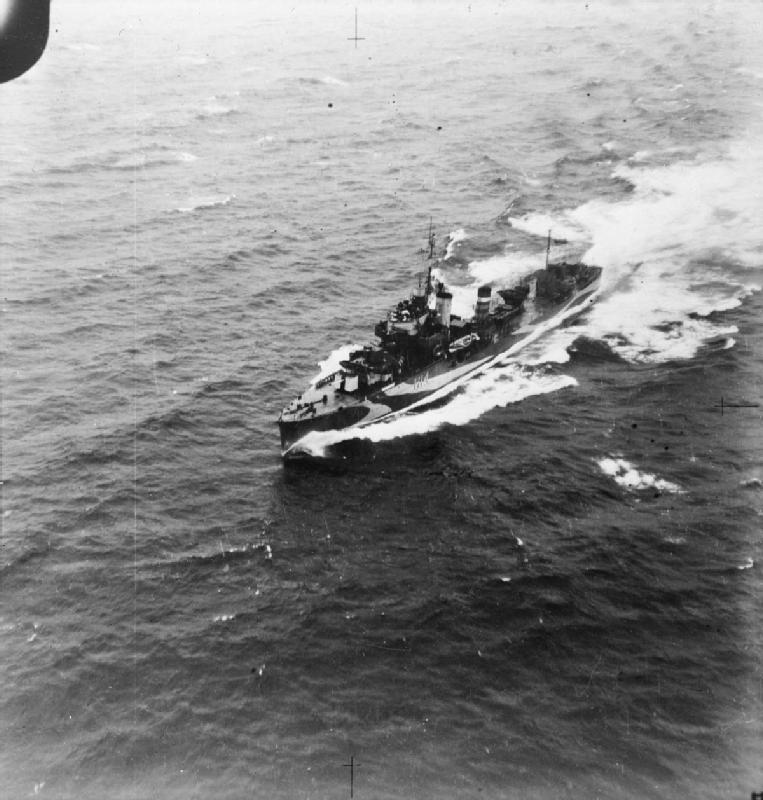
- Active in 1944

History

United Kingdom
- Name: HMS Active
- Builder: Hawthorn Leslie & Company, Hebburn
- Yard number: 557
- Laid down: 10 July 1928
- Launched: 9 July 1929
- Completed: 9 Jan 1930
- Commissioned: 9 Feb 1930
- Decommissioned: 20 May 1947
- Identification: Pennant number: H14
- Fate: Sold for scrap, 1947

General characteristics (as built)
- Class & type: A-class destroyer
- Displacement: 1,350 long tons (1,370 t) (standard); 1,773 long tons (1,801 t) (deep load)
- Length: 323 ft (98 m) (o/a)
- Beam: 32 ft 3 in (9.83 m)
- Draught: 12 ft 3 in (3.73 m)
- Installed power: 34,000 shp (25,000 kW); 3 × Admiralty 3-drum boilers
- Propulsion: 2 × shafts; 2 × geared steam turbines
- Speed: 35 knots (65 km/h; 40 mph)
- Range: 4,800 nmi (8,900 km; 5,500 mi) at 15 knots (28 km/h; 17 mph)
- Complement: 134; 140 (1940)
- Armament: 4 × single 4.7 in (120 mm) guns; 2 × single 2-pdr (40 mm) AA guns; 2 × quadruple 21 in (533 mm) torpedo tubes; 6 × depth charges, 3 chutes

HMS Active, the tenth Active, launched in 1929, was an A-class destroyer. She served in the Second World War, taking part in the sinking of four submarines. She was broken up in 1947.

== Construction and design ==
Active was ordered on 6 March 1928 as a part of the first class of destroyers for the Royal Navy to be built after the First World War. The ship was laid down on 10 July 1928 at Hawthorn Leslie in Hebburn, Newcastle upon Tyne, was launched on 9 July 1929 and commissioned on 9 February 1930 with the pennant number H14, being the first of the A class to be completed.

Like the rest of the A class, Active had a main gun armament of four 4.7 in (120 mm) guns on low angle (30 degree) mounts that were only suitable for anti-ship use, and an anti-aircraft armament of two 2-pounder (40 mm) "pom-poms". Eight 21 in (533 mm) torpedo tubes were carried on two quadruple mounts, with Mark V torpedoes. No Asdic (sonar) set was initially fitted, although provision was made to fit one later, while anti-submarine armament consisted of three depth charge chutes with six depth charges carried. High speed minesweeping equipment was also fitted.

The ship was powered by two Parsons geared steam turbines fed by three Admiralty 3-drum boilers. The machinery generated 34,000 shaft horsepower (25,000 kW), driving the ship to a design speed of 35.25 knots (65.28 km/h; 40.56 mph), although 36.73 knots (68.02 km/h; 42.27 mph) were reached during trials in December 1929.

== History ==
=== Pre-war operations ===
Following commissioning, Active joined the Third Destroyer Flotilla as part of the Mediterranean Fleet, remaining in the Mediterranean other than for refits until 1939. On 4 April 1932, Active was involved in a collision with fellow A-class destroyer HMS Achates off Saint-Tropez, although damage was limited. Active patrolled off the coast of Palestine in response to the Arab revolt in June 1936. Following the outbreak of the Spanish Civil War, the ship patrolled off Spain from September 1936 to January 1937.

On 16 February 1937, Active collided with the destroyer HMS Worcester following failure of Active's steering gear at high speed. This time damage was more severe and Active was under repair at Malta until June that year, when the ship joined the Second Destroyer Flotilla. Active served with the Second Flotilla until October 1938, when she went into reserve at Malta. Active recommissioned as a tender to Cormorant, the receiving ship at Gibraltar on 22 April 1939.

=== Second World War ===
At the beginning of the Second World War she joined the 13th Destroyer Flotilla based in Gibraltar and in June 1940 joined Force H. As such she took part in Operation Catapult against the French fleet in Mers El Kébir. On 31 July Active set out from Gibraltar as part of Force H for Operation Hurry in which aircraft from the aircraft carrier Ark Royal attacked Cagliari in Italy as a diversion while the carrier Argus ferried 12 Hurricane fighters to Malta. In August 1940, she returned to British waters, joining the 12th Destroyer Flotilla for operations in the Western Approaches and with the Home Fleet. From November 1940 to March 1941 Active was refitted at Liverpool.

After completing this refit, Active joined the 3rd Destroyer Flotilla of the Home Fleet, and in May 1941 the ship participated in the hunt for the German battleship Bismarck. From 16 to 29 August 1941, Active took part in Operation Dervish, forming part of the escort for the first Arctic convoy of the war. From 28 September 1941, she formed part of the escort of Convoy QP 1, the first return Arctic convoy. When the Naval trawler Ophelia suffered machinery problems on 5 October, Active took the trawler in tow, reaching Akureyri, Iceland on 10 October. In November–December 1941, Active was refitted.

After the refit, Active joined the 38th Destroyer Flotilla as part of Force H. On 27–28 February 1942, Active formed part of the escort for the aircraft carriers Argus and Eagle in an attempt to fly off Spitfire fighters to besieged Malta. The operation was abandoned when it was found that the long-range tanks fitted to the aircraft were faulty. The operation was repeated on 6–8 March 1942, again with Active as part of the escort, and this time 15 Spitfires reached Malta. On 20 March, H-Force, including Active, set out from Gibraltar on another fighter Club Run for Malta. When the time came on 23 March to launch the fighters, only nine of the sixteen Spitfires were launched owing to the non-arrival of guide aircraft from Malta. This resulted in the operation being repeated from 27 to 30 March using the same ships, with the remaining 7 Spitfires flown off. In April 1942 she was detached to take part in the Madagascar landings. Active escorted one of the two convoys carrying forces for the landings near Diego-Suarez (Operation Ironclad) before joining the covering force for the landings on 5 May. On 8 May she and the destroyer Panther sank the Vichy French submarine Monge, which had attempted to attempted to torpedo the aircraft carrier Indomitable. In September 1942, Active took part in the landings at Tamatave in the east of Madagascar (Operation Jane) carrying Commandos who were landed on 18 September, then going to the assistance of the transport Ocean Viking which ran aground in Tamative harbour later that day and together with the minesweeper Cromer, helped to refloat the stranded ship.

Active was then transferred to South African waters. On 8 October 1942, Active, along with the destroyers Arrow, Foxhound and Nizam and the corvette Rockrose sortied against an attack on shipping by German submarines of Wolfpack Eisbär. On the evening of 8 October, Active was rescuing survivors from the freighter City of Athens, which had been sunk by the German submarine U-179 earlier that day, when her radar operator spotted a contact. Active headed for the suspicious contact at full speed, and spotted a surfaced submarine (which was U-179), and attacked with gunfire. When the submarine submerged, Active dropped ten depth charges. U-179 was briefly blown to the surface before sinking.

After a refit in the United Kingdom that was completed in April 1943, Active rejoined the 13th Destroyer Flotilla based at Gibraltar. While on passage to Gibraltar as part of the escort for Convoys WS.30/KMF.15, on 23 May 1943, Active and the frigate Ness sank the Italian submarine Leonardo da Vinci, which was returning from a patrol off South Africa, near Cape Finisterre. On the night of 1/2 November 1943, U-340 was attempting to pass through the Straits of Gibraltar when the submarine was attacked by two Leigh light-equipped Wellington aircraft of 179 Squadron RAF and damaged. Later on 2 November, the submarine was detected with Asdic by a British surface patrol and subject to a massed depth charge attack by Active, the destroyer Witherington and the sloop Fleetwood, further damaging the submarine. The submarine was scuttled later that day east of Ceuta. The survivors were rescued by a Spanish trawler, but then captured by Fleetwood. On 9 January 1944, Active rescued the pilot and only survivor of a 179 Squadron Wellington that had been shot down the previous night by the German submarine U-343 south-west of Cartagena, Spain.

In October 1944, Active returned to British waters, serving with the 1st Destroyer Flotilla based at Portsmouth before being refitted in November–December that year. Active then returned to the Mediterranean, rejoining the Third Destroyer Flotilla, based at Alexandria, Egypt. Active was deployed in operations against German forces in the Aegean Sea and on 28 February 1945 captured a landing craft. On 2 March, Active took part in the capture of the island of Piskopi, north west of Rhodes. In May 1947 Active was decommissioned and sold for scrap.
