= Italian submarine Leonardo da Vinci (1939) =

Italian submarine

- Leonardo da Vinci in 1940

History

Italy
- Name: Leonardo da Vinci
- Builder: CRDA (Monfalcone, Italy)
- Launched: 16 September 1939
- Home port: BETASOM, Bordeaux
- Fate: Sunk 24 May 1943

General characteristics
- Class & type: Marconi-class submarine
- Displacement: 1,175 long tons (1,194 t) standard; 1,465 long tons (1,489 t) full load
- Length: 76.5 m (251 ft)
- Beam: 6.81 m (22.3 ft)
- Draught: 4.72 m (15.5 ft)
- Propulsion: Diesel engines, 3,600 hp (2,685 kW) (surfaced); Electric motors 1,500 hp (1,119 kW) (submerged); 2 shafts
- Speed: 17.8 knots (33.0 km/h; 20.5 mph) surfaced; 8.2 kn (15.2 km/h; 9.4 mph) submerged
- Complement: 57
- Armament: 1 × 100 mm (4 in) / 47 caliber gun; 4 × 13.2 mm anti-aircraft guns; 8 × 21 in (533 mm) torpedo tubes (4 bow, 4 stern); 12 torpedoes

Leonardo da Vinci was a Marconi-class submarine of the Italian navy during World War II. It operated in the Atlantic from September 1940 until its loss in May 1943, and became the top scoring non-German submarine of the entire war.

== Construction ==
Leonardo da Vinci was built at the CRDA shipyard in Monfalcone, near Trieste, Italy's leading submarine builder. One of six boats of the Marconi class, which were laid down in 1938–39, Leonardo da Vinci was launched in September 1939. Designed as an ocean-going vessel, she was intended for operations in both the Mediterranean and the Atlantic.

== Service history ==
With Italy's entry into World War II in June 1940 Leonardo da Vinci was dispatched to the Atlantic to Bordeaux in occupied France to serve in the Italian submarine flotilla there, BETASOM. She arrived October 1940 after a successful transit of the Straits of Gibraltar, scene of a number of Axis submarine losses.

Leonardo da Vinci carried out 11 war patrols, sinking 17 ships of 120,243 GRT, which included the 21,500-ton ocean liner RMS Empress of Canada. Leonardo da Vinci was Italy's most successful submarine in World War II, and her captain, Lt. Gianfranco Gazzana-Priaroggia, Italy's leading submarine ace. In July 1942 Leonardo da Vinci was assigned to a special operation aimed at mounting raids on harbours on the eastern seaboard of the United States. To this end she was converted to carry a CA-class midget submarine, and during the autumn engaged in trials with the new weapon. However, the operation was delayed due to the need for modifications to the CA craft and Leonardo da Vinci returned to action to the Atlantic.

=== Planned attack on New York Harbor ===
Leonardo da Vinci was to be used in a clandestine attack on the New York Harbor. The project, first started in July 1942 by Junio Valerio Borghese, involved launching Leonardo da Vinci from the BETASOM base in Bordeaux to the mouth of the Hudson River loaded with a CA-class submarine and a team of divers armed with 28 explosive charges. Once in position, the divers would take the CA-class into the harbor. Their charges – ranging in size from 20 to 100 kg – would be set to undermine the ships in the harbor.

Early tests carried out in August 1942 were promising, showing that Leonardo da Vinci could effectively launch the CA-class and recover it. In reality, however, recovery of the CA-class was a remote possibility, and it was more likely that the divers would have to destroy the vehicle once they had completed setting their charges.

The mission was postponed following the loss of Leonardo da Vinci, and was ultimately canceled when the armistice was signed four months later.

=== Last patrol ===
In March 1943 Leonardo da Vinci made her last and most successful patrol, to the South Atlantic. On 14 March she sank the Empress of Canada en route to Takoradi, West Africa. She was carrying Italian prisoners of war, and Polish and Greek refugees, and of the 1,800 people on board, 392 perished. On 19 March Leonardo da Vinci torpedoed and sank the 7,628-ton British cargo ship SS Lulworth Hill in the South Atlantic. She captured and took on board one survivor; two other men survived following a 50-day ordeal on a life raft.

In April 1943 Leonardo da Vinci sank four vessels in the Indian Ocean off the coast of Durban.

== Fate ==
After the last sinking at the end of April, Leonardo da Vinci turned for home. On 22 May 1943, off the coast of Spain, her commander unwisely signaled his intention to head for Bordeaux. The submarine's position having been fixed by direction-finding, on 23 May the destroyer HMS Active and the frigate HMS Ness (both escorts to convoys WS-30 and KMF-15) subjected the submarine to an intense depth charge attack and sank it 300 miles (480 km) west of Vigo at an estimated position of 42°16′0″N 15°40′0″W. There were no survivors. Jim Wilson, who directed the attack on HMS Ness, was awarded a Distinguished Service Cross for his role.

== Successes ==
Ships sunk by da Vinci
Patrol	Date	Ship	Flag	Tonnage	Notes
4th	28 June 1941	Auris	United Kingdom	8,030	Tanker; 27 survivors from a crew of 59
6th	25 February 1942	Cabedello	Brazil	3,557	Freighter; no survivors
6th	28 February 1942	Everasma	Latvia	3,644	Freighter from Convoy TAW 12 torpedoed at 16°00′N 49°00′W; 15 survivors. (See Latvian Mercantile Marine during WWII)
7th	2 June 1942	Reine Marie Stewart	Panama	1,087	Schooner
7th	7 June 1942	Chile	Denmark	6,956	Freighter; 39 survivors from a crew of 44
7th	10 June 1942	Alioth	Netherlands	5,483	Freighter; 8 survivors from a crew of 36
7th	13 June 1942	Clan Macquarrie	United Kingdom	6,471	Collier; 1 killed from a crew of 90
8th	2 November 1942	Empire Zeal	United Kingdom	7,009	Freighter
8th	5 November 1942	Andreas	Greece	6,566	Freighter
8th	10 November 1942	Marcus Whitman	United States	7,176	Liberty ship; no casualties
8th	11 November 1942	Veerhaven	Netherlands	5,291	Freighter; no casualties
9th	14 March 1943	RMS Empress of Canada	Canada	21,517	Troopship; 392 killed from 1,800 aboard
9th	18 March 1943	Lulworth Hill	United Kingdom	7,628	Freighter
9th	17 April 1943	Sembilan	Netherlands	6,566	Freighter
9th	18 April 1943	Manar	United Kingdom	8,007	Freighter
9th	21 April 1943	John Drayton	United States	7,177	Liberty ship
9th	25 April 1943	Doryessa	United Kingdom	8,078	Tanker; 11 survivors from a crew of 54
Total:				120,243	
