= HMS Ness (1942) =

1942 River-class frigate of the Royal Navy

History

United Kingdom
- Name: Ness
- Namesake: Ness
- Ordered: 11 February 1941
- Builder: Henry Robb Ltd
- Laid down: 3 September 1941
- Launched: 30 July 1942
- Commissioned: 22 December 1942
- Fate: Sold for scrap in September 1956

General characteristics
- Class & type: River-class frigate
- Displacement: 1,370 long tons (1,390 t); 1,830 long tons (1,860 t) (deep load)
- Length: 283 ft (86.26 m) p/p; 301.25 ft (91.82 m)o/a
- Beam: 36.5 ft (11.13 m)
- Draught: 9 ft (2.74 m); 13 ft (3.96 m) (deep load)
- Propulsion: 2 × Admiralty 3-drum boilers, 2 shafts, reciprocating vertical triple expansion, 5,500 ihp (4,100 kW)
- Speed: 20 knots (37.0 km/h)
- Range: 7,200 nautical miles (13,334 km) at 12 knots (22.2 km/h), with 440 long tons (450 t; 490 short tons) of oil
- Complement: 107
- Armament: 2 × QF 4-inch (102 mm) Mk.XIX guns, single mounts CP Mk.XXIII; up to 10 × QF 20 mm Oerlikon AA guns on twin mounts Mk.V and single mounts Mk.III; 1 × Hedgehog 24 spigot A/S projector; up to 150 depth charges

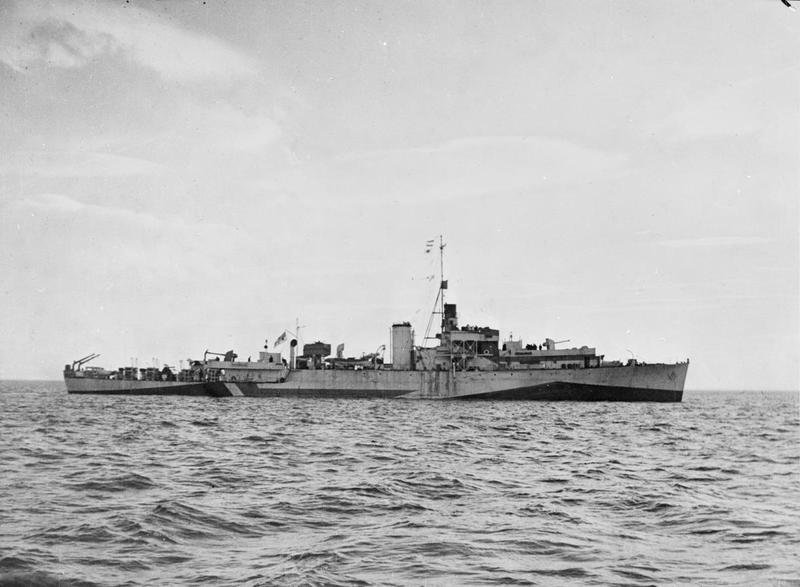
HMS Ness at sea 4 February 1943

HMS Ness (K219) was a River-class frigate of the Royal Navy (RN). Ness was built by Henry Robb, Limited in Edinburgh, Scotland at the Leith docks for the Royal Navy. She served during World War II.

Ness was one of 151 River-class frigates launched between 1941 and 1944 for use as anti-submarine convoy escorts, named after rivers in the United Kingdom. The ships were designed by naval engineer William Reed, of Smith's Dock Company of South Bank-on-Tees, to have the endurance and anti-submarine capabilities of the Black Swan-class sloops, while being quick and cheap to build in civil dockyards using the machinery (e.g. reciprocating steam engines instead of turbines) and construction techniques pioneered in the building of the Flower-class corvettes. Its purpose was to improve on the convoy escort classes in service with the Royal Navy at the time, including the Flower class.

On 23 May 1943, while escorting a convoy about 350 miles (560 km) west of Portugal's north coast Ness and HMS Active sighted a surfaced submarine and closed to attack. After several depth charge runs multiple explosions were heard on deck, and debris was seen surfacing in the ocean. Later it was learned that the Italian submarine Leonardo da Vinci, the most successful Italian submarine of the war, had been sunk along with all crew.
