= No. 179 Squadron RAF =

Defunct flying squadron of the Royal Air Force

- Active: 1 September 1942 – 30 September 1946
- Country: United Kingdom
- Branch: Royal Air Force
- Motto: Latin: Delentum deleo (I destroy the destroyer)

Insignia
- Squadron Badge: A lantern in front of a harpoon
- Squadron code: OZ (Nov 1944 – Sept 1946)

No. 179 Squadron RAF was a Royal Air Force Squadron that was a maritime patrol/anti-submarine warfare unit in World War II.

== History ==
=== Formation in World War II ===
No. 179 squadron equipped with 16 + 4 Wellington Mk.VIII Leigh Light aircraft was formed on 1 September 1942 at RAF Skitten in Caithness. The Squadron was initially to consist of a flight from No. 172 Squadron RAF which were on detachment to RAF Skitten and RAF Wick consisting of 8 aircraft, a flight commander, and 6 fully trained crews. Additionally 6 Armstrong Whitworth Whitley trained crews from No.3 Operational Training Unit, and 4 fully trained crews from No. 612 Squadron RAF would also join the squadron. No. 172 Squadron also transferred 50% of their servicing personnel to No. 179 Squadron. The aircraft required to make up the establishment were expected to arrive at Skitten during the months of September, October, and November 1942. It was then stationed at Gibraltar, before operating patrols from airfields in the United Kingdom including RAF Chivenor, RAF Benbecula, RAF Predannack and RAF St Eval in Cornwall.

In November 1944 the squadron converted to Warwick aircraft and in February 1946 one element of the squadron (179X) converted to Lancasters, while 179Y retained the Warwicks before it was renumbered No. 210 Squadron RAF. No 179 squadron was finally disbanded on 30 September 1946.

179 Squadron was a successful anti-submarine unit, accounting for eleven U-boats destroyed during the Second World War.

== Aircraft operated ==
Aircraft operated by no. 179 Squadron RAF
From	To	Aircraft	Variant
Sep 1942	Sep 1943	Vickers Wellington	VIII
Aug 1943	Nov 1944	Vickers Wellington	XIV
Nov 1944	May 1946	Vickers Warwick	V
Feb 1946	Sep 1946	Avro Lancaster	ASR 3
