= Historic center of Genoa =

Historic sector in Genoa, Italy

Historic center of Genoa Centro storico di Genova
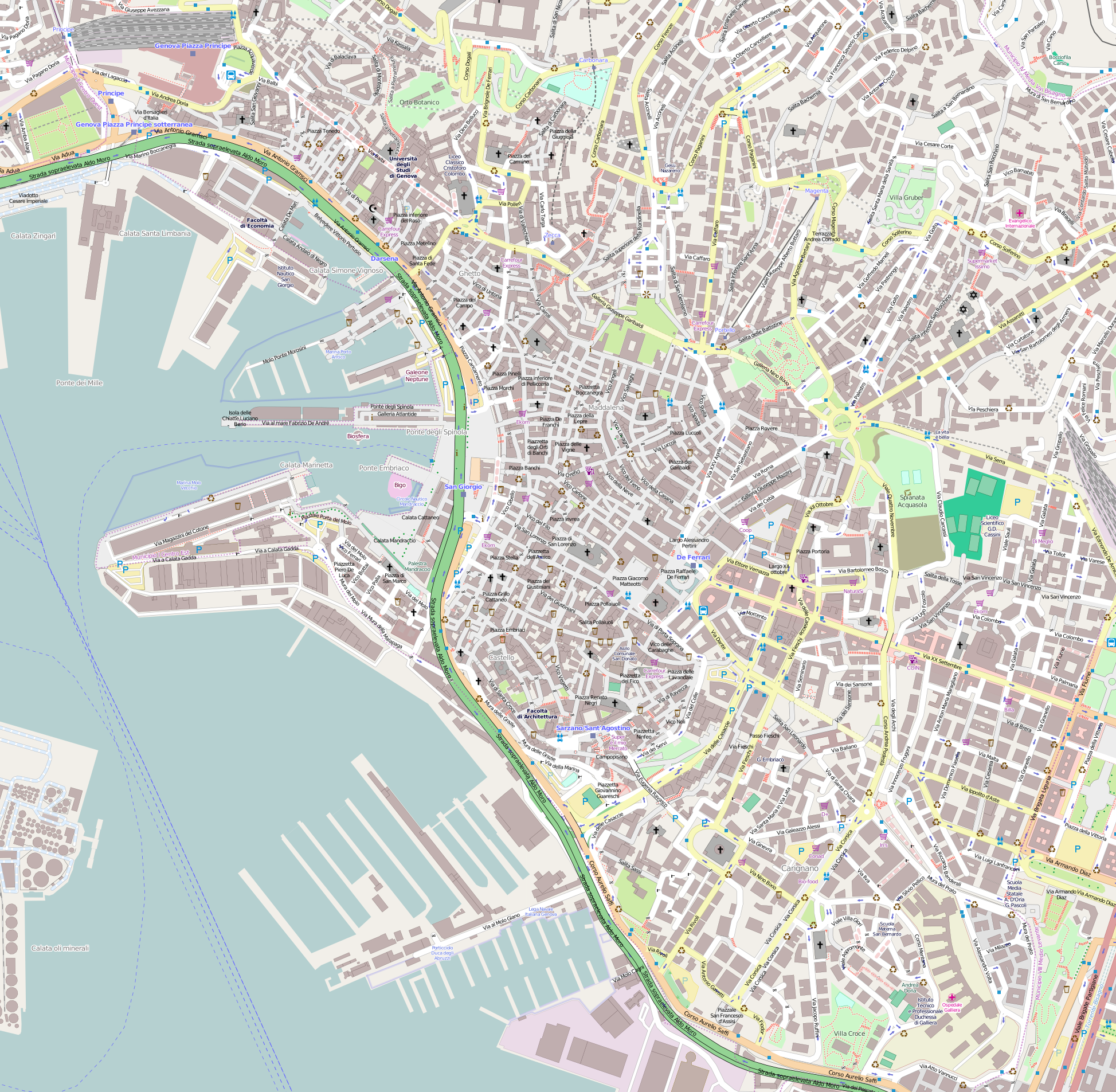
- Country: Italy
- Region: Liguria
- Province: Genoa
- City: Genoa

The historic center of Genoa is the core of the old town organized in the maze of alleys (caruggi) of medieval origin that runs – from east to west – from the hill of Carignano (Genoa) to the Genova Piazza Principe railway station, close to what was once the Palazzo del Principe, residence of Admiral Andrea Doria. Urbanistically, the area is part of Municipio I Centro-Est.

However, the current municipal area was created by the merger, which took place on several occasions starting in the second half of the 19th century, of historic Genoa with adjacent municipalities and towns (now neighborhoods), some of which have more or less ancient historic centers of their own and have been urbanistically transformed over the years.

The major urban planning operations carried out from the first half of the 19th century to beyond the middle of the 20th century (which are difficult to replicate today, given the increased interest in the protection of historic neighborhoods by the public administration), combined with the damage that occurred during World War II (many of the old buildings were destroyed during the Allied bombing raids), partly disrupted the original fabric of the historic center. Slightly less than a quarter of the buildings (23.5 percent) date from the postwar period or later.

== History and features ==
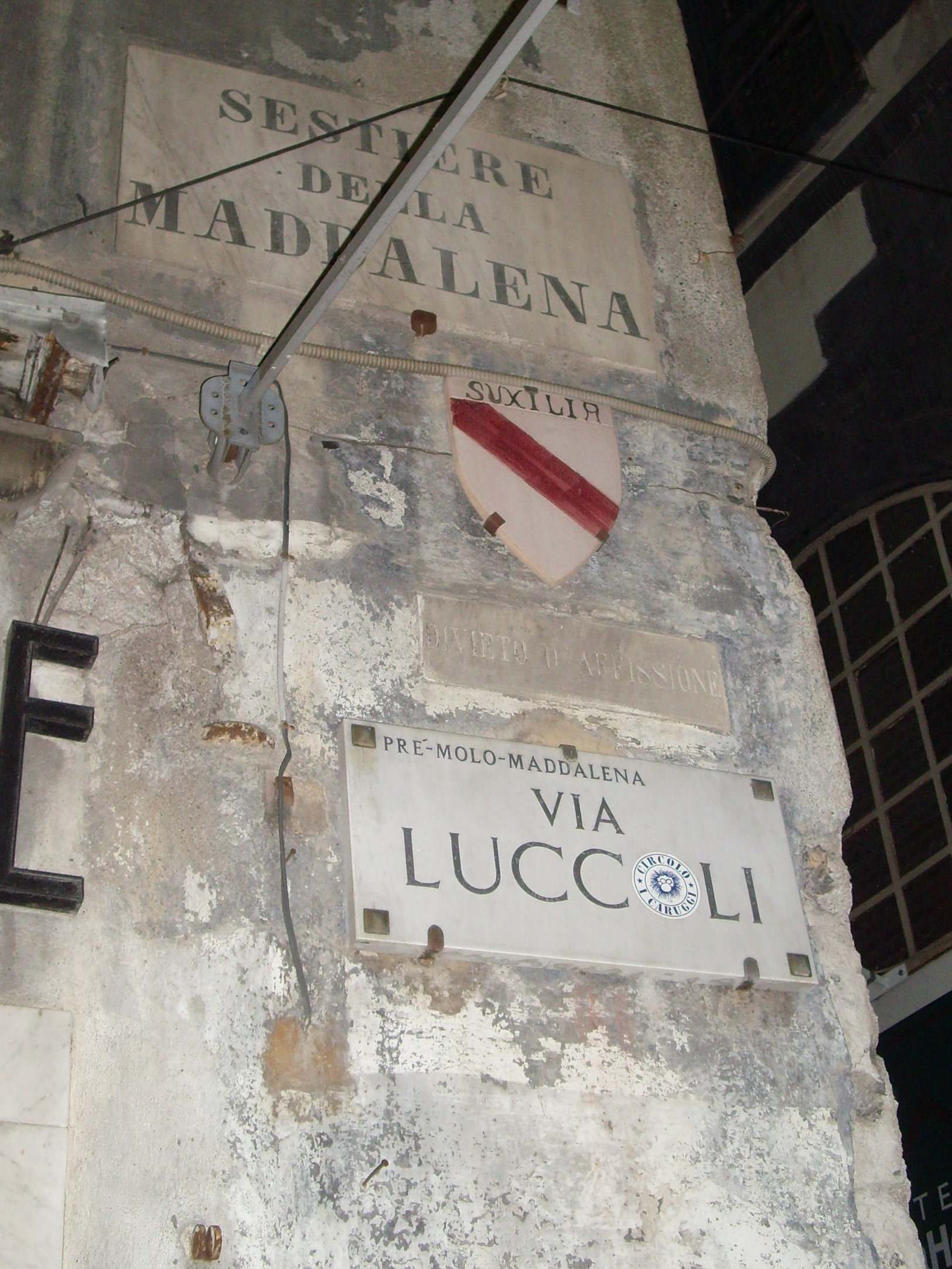
Corner of Via Luccoli, from bottom to top the street sign (with also that of the former Prè-Molo-Maddalena delegation), the heraldic shield of Suxilia's "compagna" and the Maddalena sestiere plaque

Had the architects who built Genoa had space, had they been able to indulge their imaginations unhindered by their whims, they could not have found the infinite resources and variety of motifs, designs, and arrangements that gave the façades of their palaces their original character, introducing the unexpected grandeur into every crevice.

— By Louis Énault, Breve vision hivernale d'un voyageur normand, 1850

The history of the historic core of the Ligurian capital is totally linked to the city's history, from the beginnings of the construction of the first dwellings of the Ligurians on the hill of Castello, to the Roman period, along the years of the Maritime Republics (of which the annalist Caffaro di Rustico da Caschifellone, known simply as the Caffaro, kept note), to the patriotic and insurrectional battles of Young Italy and Giuseppe Mazzini's Carboneria.

The first hypotheses about the history of ancient Genoa, unrelated to mythology or propagandistic versions of its origins and pre-Roman period, date back to the 17th century (an example is Odoardo Ganducio's Discorso sopra l'iscrittione, ouero epitafio ritrouato a Tortona in vn marmo, d' vn decurione antico genuese, 1614), but only with the discoveries that have occurred since the end of the 19th century and the subsequent study of the finds has a clearer (albeit partly incomplete) view of the city's real past become available. However, many of the publications describing the city's history up to the mid-19th century did not address the question of the location of the earliest settlements or the period in which they originated. Reconstructions of past centuries did not always prove to be accurate in the light of new discoveries, and it often occurred that they contained errors, due to a lack of archaeological sources and/or an attempt to locate elements of the ancient city based on those, more modern, of Genoa visible at the time when these hypotheses were made.

The habit of building on existing structures (often recycling materials salvaged from earlier constructions, even from places outside Genoa), the numerous alterations and expansions of pre-existing buildings and churches carried out during periods of economic prosperity and growth of the city, or even the outright urbanistic revolutions caused by the growing need to improve the city's road network, as well as the destruction wrought by French bombardments in the 17th century, those related to the Savoy's repression of the independence uprisings of 1849, and finally those suffered at the hands of the Allies in World War II, which were followed by related reconstructions, have given rise to a very heterogeneous building situation, with streets and squares where, within the space of a few dozen meters, buildings can be found separated from each other by centuries of history. Most of the ancient buildings that make up the historic center date back to the 12th and 13th centuries, although they have often undergone later modifications.

The area of the historic center is bounded by the watersheds that divide it from the Polcevera Valley to the northwest and the Bisagno Valley to the northeast. Geologically, it consists of three types of geological formations: the marly limestones of Mount Antola (Carignano and Sarzano areas, as well as the area between Righi and Castelletto and the Lanterna area), dating from the Late Cretaceous and Paleocene periods; the Val Polcevera mudstones (with some outcrops, especially in the Granarolo area), which form the base of the flysch of the earlier formation; Piccapietra marls (Portoria area and part of the Maddalena and Molo districts), dating from the Pliocene.

There were several streams and creeks in the area, which over the centuries were covered and/or channeled into the city sewer system to obtain new building areas. Some terms in the city's toponymy refer to these streams, for example in the street at the Ponte Reale (connecting Piazza Banchi to Piazza Caricamento), where the term "Reale" would not mean royalty, but would be a deformation of rià (rio, or stream, in Genoese), from the riale di Soziglia (i.e., Soziglia stream) that flowed in the area. Another example would be Piazza Acquaverde (opposite the Piazza Principe train station), whose name is said to derive from the presence of a pond rich in algae, hence the greenish color, fed by the Sant'Ugo stream (a legend has it that it was the saint himself who caused the water that fed the pond to gush out).

The historic center is traditionally divided into six areas called sestieri: (Prè, Portoria, Molo, Maddalena, San Vincenzo (Genoa), San Teodoro), with the historical trace of the ancient districts of what was once the capital of the Republic of Genoa being maintained. This subdivision falls outside the one that sees the municipal territory organized into more than a dozen wards (or municipalities): the six sestieri are currently included in the territory of the Municipi I Centro Est and II Centro Ovest (for the sestiere of San Teodoro alone).

Streets and alleys traditionally were paved with stones or bricks, which composed various designs, from the more linear ones, such as parallel-row or herringbone placement, to more complex ones. The stone slabs were usually of two sizes, a thin and long type (about 12–15 cm by 70–75 cm), called "cordonini," and a wider type (24–26 cm by 50–60 com) called "tacchi," and sometimes these were alternated with bricks or flanked by cobblestones. In churchyards or palace gardens sometimes the technique of risseu, a cobblestone mosaic typical of Liguria, was used. Over the years, asphalt paving has covered some of the original pavement.

=== Surface ===
In view of the original core's size of 1.13 km² (i.e., 113 hectares, the area of the Prè-Molo-Maddalena neighborhoods), it is cited as the most extensive old town in Europe. In fact, this may be considered an urban legend, as it turns out to be less extensive than, for example, Rome (1,430 hectares) and Naples (the latter, with its 1,700 hectares, the largest).

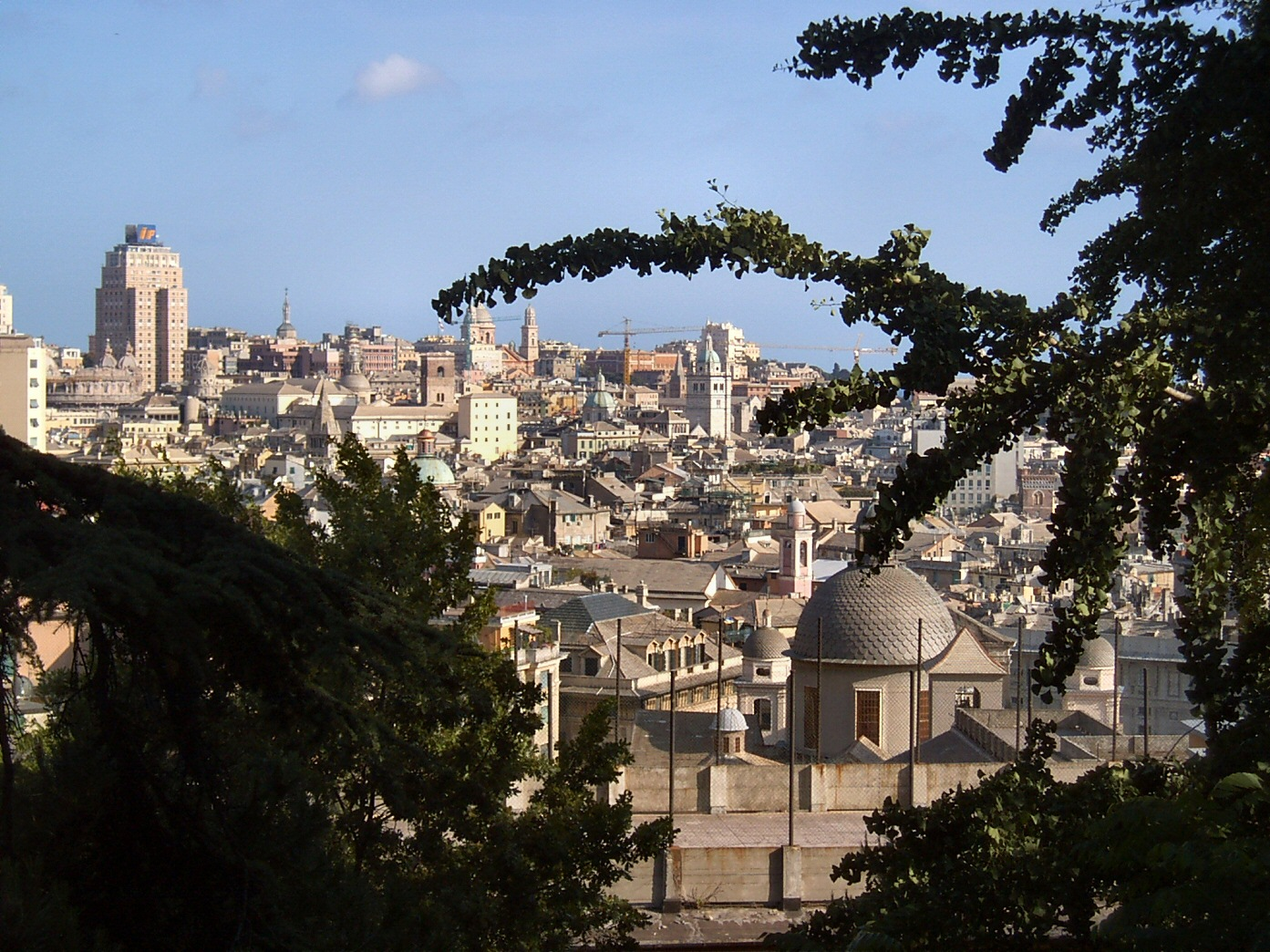
Glimpse with part of the historic center, photographed from above the university's botanical garden. On the upper left is the Clock Skyscraper built in the 1930s to a design by Marcello Piacentini. In the center of the photo is the bell tower of San Lorenzo Cathedral and in the background part of the basilica of Santa Maria Assunta, the work of Alessi

The high density of buildings, especially after the enormous building growth that began with the 18th century, nevertheless makes it one of the historical centers with the highest population density: about 23,000 inhabitants live in the oldest area (also including the port area), distributed in 2305 buildings (value as of 1999) on a volume of about 10 million cubic meters.

The area of the historic center, due to the orography of the area, varies, even greatly, depending on the criteria and method used to estimate it. In the Dizionario geografico storico-statistico-commerciale degli Stati di S. M. il Re di Sardegna Volume 7 (published in 1840) by Goffredo Casalis, the surface area of the town is estimated, also using data from M. Cevasco's Statistique de la ville de Genes, published a few years earlier, pointing out how its conformation, endowed with numerous changes in the elevation of the terrain, makes the flat area much less than it actually is:

Mr. Cevasco says that it has 896 hectares, with some more fractions [...] Such a vast surface may seem incredible, but you will want to consider that the flat surface, that is, horizontally, is only 164 hectares, and that the mountainous part, which is cut by rivulets in many small valleys, offers a surface two and three times as large as it would have if it were flattened by filling the ravines.

The text then gives these surface figures (in hectares) for the six sestieri as they were delimited at the time:

Sestieri	Total area (hectares)	Flat area (hectares)
San Vincenzo	253	42
San Teodoro	458	21
Pré	49	24
Maddalena	23	7
Portoria	83	42
Molo	30	28
Total	896	164

The municipality of Genoa, for the urban units covering the two districts related to the city center, provides these area values (not all the urban units listed are part of what is identified with the historic center):

Municipio I Genova Centro Est			Municipio II Genova Centro Ovest		
Urban unit	Total area (hectares)	Population center (hectares)	Urban unit	Total area (hectares)	Population center (hectares)
Lagaccio	89,48	46,23	Campasso	82,83	69,31
Oregina	185,24	61,22	San Gaetano	34,77	34,36
Prè	44,96	37,29	Sampierdarena	53,01	52,06
Maddalena	26,95	22,33	Belvedere	47,34	47,29
Molo	34,96	33,42	San Bartolomeo	89,49	66,07
San Nicola	80,85	65,36	Angeli	74,72	63,78
Castelletto	67,71	67,71	San Teodoro	103,04	90,48
Manin	49,93	44,19			
San Vincenzo	68,53	59,36			
Carignano	59,13	58,53			

=== The development of early Genoa and early settlements ===
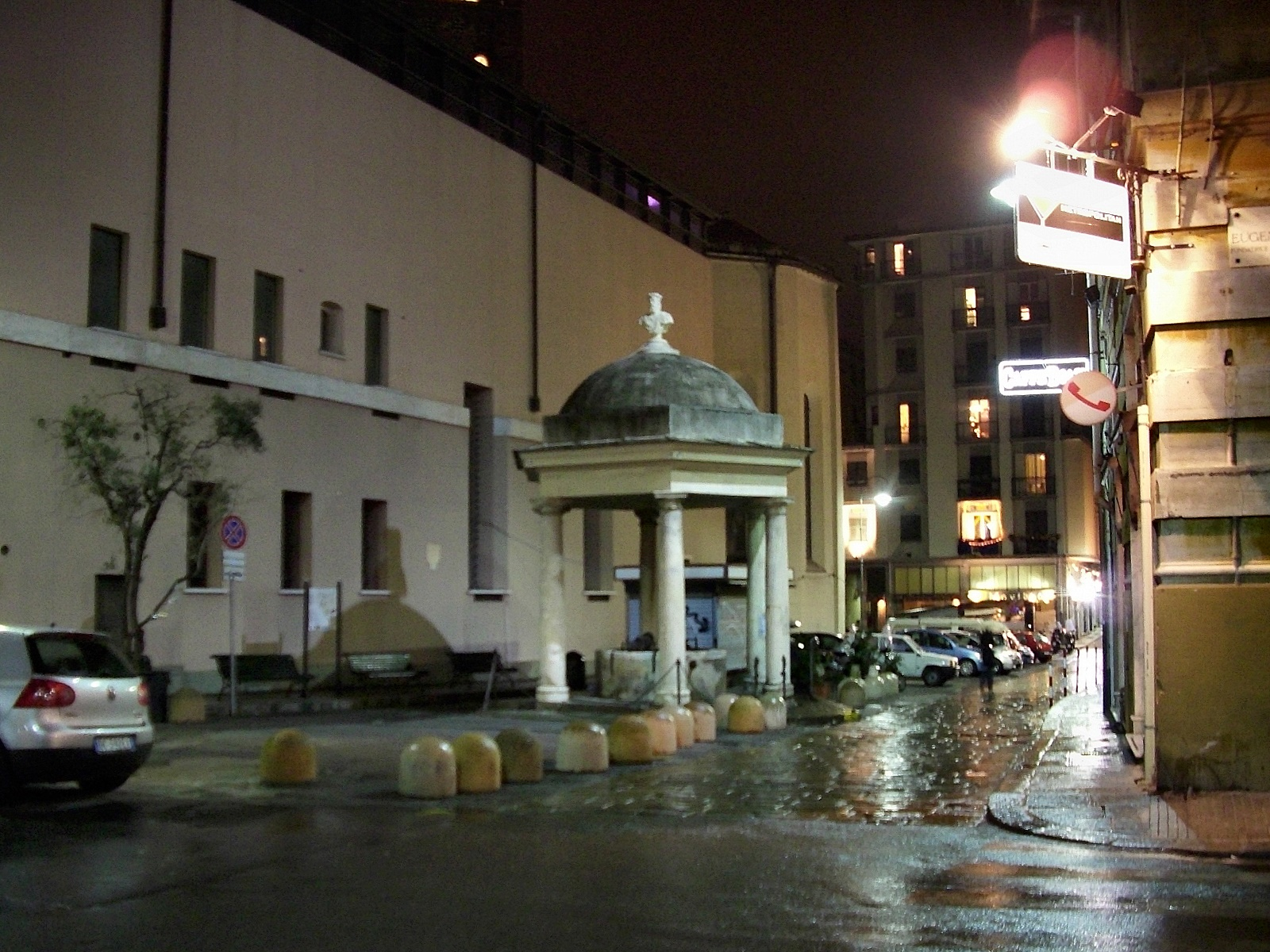
Sarzano Square, in the Molo sestiere, one of the first areas of the historic center to be inhabited. This square and its surroundings were also damaged by Allied bombing in World War II and renovated in the following decades. The fountain in the square, the work of Bartolomeo Bianco and built around the mid-17th century, is located above one of the cisterns that served the city in case of siege. On top of the hexagonal temple that covers the structure is a statue depicting Janus, a reminder of one of the theories that claim the name Genoa derives from that of the Roman deity. With the opening in 2006, after years of construction, of the Sarzano-Sant'Agostino subway station, the square was reached by public transportation for the first time.

As written earlier, due to the frequent and continuous construction of new buildings on top of what previously existed and after the bombing of the last world war, no Roman or pre-Roman remains are visible. Over the past two centuries, remodeling works in some parts of the city (e.g., Via XX Settembre and surrounding areas between the 18th and 19th centuries), as well as restoration and extension works on buildings and streets, have repeatedly brought to light numerous ruins and objects related to early city settlements or the later Roman period.

During excavations for the construction of the subway, a 12-meter-long dry-stone wall with nearby remains of hearths and a canal were found in the area adjacent to the Brignole train station, the origin of which would date back to a period between the 3rd and 2nd millennia BC. This construction would demonstrate the probable presence of small settlements in the area since the Bronze Age. A fraction of the wall was later reconstructed and displayed in the subway station that arose in the area, along with another find, namely part of the churchyard of the ancient church of Santa Maria degli Incrociati (a name given to the Hospitallers who had a shelter and church there in the late Middle Ages).

The presence of the wall (believed after studies to be the retaining wall of a road), as well as the probable remains of a pile-dwelling found during work in the area of the present-day Piazza della Vittoria (the dating of which would date it to a period between 4790 B.C. and 4460 B.C.), led archaeologists of the Superintendence for Archaeological Heritage of Liguria to assume that there was a river port at the nearby mouth of the Bisagno stream, with a settlement behind it.

Reconstructions made by historians in the second half of the 20th century, prior to these findings, had identified the first port area in the area of the "ancient port," about 1.5 km (as the crow flies) west/northwest of this possible river port. There, in the area of the eighteenth-century portofranco (roughly today's Piazza Cavour), at the time of the first settlements at the base of the Sarzano hill (later named Mandraccio), artifacts were found spread over several layers, the oldest of which dated (through some wooden remains) between the 10th and 9th centuries BC, as well as layers containing artifacts (including many amphorae) dated as belonging to the centuries between the 6th and 1st centuries B.C. In January 2013, during archaeological inspections carried out along the nearby Spinola Bridge as part of the work related to the expansion of the Genoa Aquarium with a new dolphin tank, remains of vases and amphorae, both Etruscan and Roman, were found, some of them containing fruit stones, legumes and seeds. The finds, recovered at a depth of about 13 meters, would be several hundred meters from what is estimated to have been the coastline in Roman times, leading to speculation that the area was used as a sort of dumping ground by ships.

As for the earliest, more developed settlements, in pre-Roman times, it is believed that the hill of Sarzano (also known as di Castello or Colle del Castello, perhaps from the early medieval castle on the site, later to become the convent of San Silvestro), from which the underlying stretch of sea could be controlled, and its beach, were among the first inhabited places in the center of Genoa. Precisely in order to verify the thesis that saw the Sarzano hill as the site of pre-Roman settlements (specifically a possible boundary wall), the first archaeological excavations carried out explicitly in the area for research purposes were carried out in 1939 by Luigi Bernabò Brea: the area investigated was the one on which rested part of the (destroyed) church of Santa Maria in Passione, but the results and conclusions reached are not known for sure. More systematic excavations took place in the following decades, facilitated by the work of restoring the area after the bombing suffered during World War II. The findings show that as early as the 6th century B.C. the beach was a point of exchange between merchants from the Mediterranean cities that frequented the port and the inland populations. Excavations on the hill, after bombings had destroyed the convent of San Silvestro, showed that layers as much as four meters thick were present in the area, with ruins, walls and stones used in earlier construction. The construction of dwellings began around the 6th century B.C. and continued until the 2nd century B.C., while around the 4th century B.C. the area was protected with an initial enclosure of drystone walls. The top of the hill was probably flattened, and terracing was built along its sides. Until the recent discoveries in the area of Brignole and the mouth of the Bisagno River, mentioned just above, which have raised new questions about the location of the first city nucleus, it was believed that the port city of Genoa at that time most likely included the area corresponding roughly to the Molo district.

Centuries later, the Sarzano hill shows nothing of the original buildings, but highlights the Embriaci tower, the convent of Santa Maria di Castello, and the Campopisano esplanade, a symbol of the naval victory of the Republic of Genoa over the neighboring Maritime Republic of Pisa.

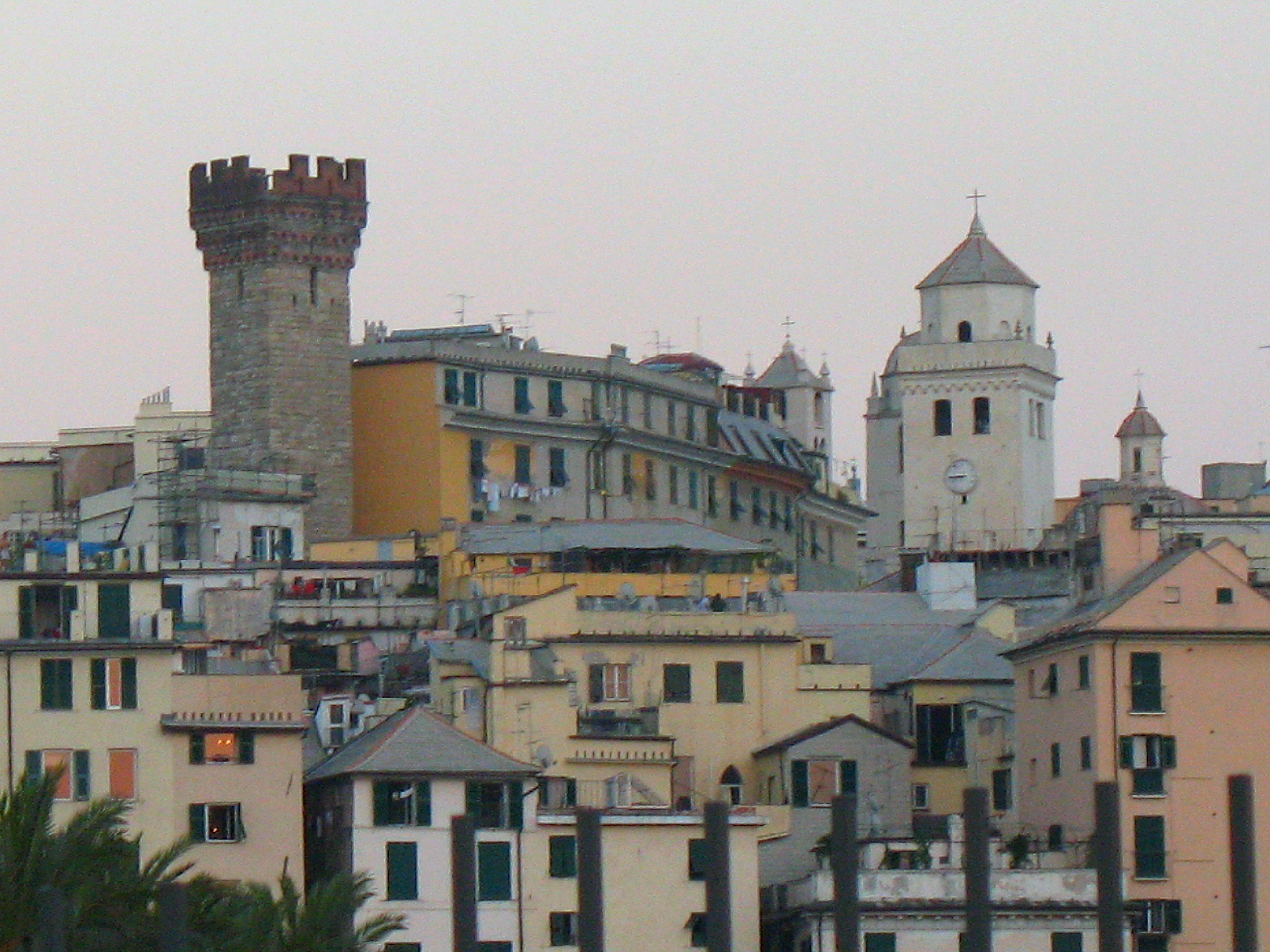
Sarzano Hill. The Embriaci tower and the bell tower of the church of Santa Maria di Castello are visible.

Numerous burials, containing urns (cremation was used, as in much of the ancient world) and grave goods, have also been found in the area of the historic center: the aforementioned work on the construction of Via XX Settembre brought to light 73 tombs in the upper part of the street and around Piazza De Ferrari, which with work in the area in the following decades came to 121 (late 1960s). It is estimated that this necropolis had been used between the fifth and third centuries B.C. The tombs, part of which had already been looted or damaged in ancient times, each contained several urns and were, for the most part of those discovered, of a type similar to that used by the Etruscans of northern Etruria, different from that typical of the Ligurian populations of previous centuries, probably the result of a custom adopted through immigration. Historians, based on the characteristics of the tombs found (such as the greater density of them in some areas) and the discovery of the remains of other destroyed burials, believe that those identified are only a small part of those that originally constituted the necropolis. More recent work related to events hosted by the city has led to the discovery of early medieval burials in Via San Lorenzo (in 2001, during road resurfacing work for the Genoa G8) and a burial mound in the Acquasola area (in 2008, during work for the subway). The latter discovery, according to some initial analyses, could refer to settlements temporally preceding the finds found in Castello Hill, thus proving that the first settlements in this area of the city center undergoing works would predate what has been believed so far.

While the Etruscans probably traded with local populations even before the 6th century B.C., it was only with the partitioning of areas of influence in the Mediterranean Sea that occurred after the Battle of Alalia (c. 540 B.C.) that ancient Genoa came strongly into the sphere of Etruscan political/cultural influence. The result of this interest in the area by the neighboring Etruscan civilization would lead to the enlargement of the settlement on Castello Hill. According to a recent theory, the name "Genoa" itself would derive from the Etruscan term "kainua" (new city), which probably could have been employed to refer to new settlements. Finds that can be linked to the Etruscan presence also include a probable boundary stone, containing the Etruscan-language inscription mi nemetiés, identified in the area of the former convent of San Silvestro and dated around the first half of the fifth century B.C.

Adding to the difficulty in reconstructing this period of the city's history, there is also the fact that not even the later Latin sources (at least those that have come down to us) report information on the origin of Genua, but merely mention it in connection with its relations with Rome.

=== The Roman Era ===
In later centuries the city of Genoa would expand into the areas near the hill of Castello, but within the boundaries from present-day Great Genoa, established in 1926, there were then settlements of other Ligurian peoples, as evidenced by the bronze Polcevera tablet from 117 BC. Records of Genoa at the time, however, are not very numerous, with the exception of those that show the city and its inhabitants engaged in the wars of the Romans, often in a position opposite to that of the other Ligurian tribes and towns.

Genoa, like other Ligurian towns, was probably linked to Rome by economic and political motives as early as the 4th century BCE. During the Second Punic War the city, regarded as foedus aequum in Roman international politics, was destroyed by General Mago Barca, Hannibal's brother, in 205 BC. A few years later the propraetor Spurius Lucretius undertook the reconstruction, probably because of the strategic importance of the city and its port, due to its location that allowed both sea access to the western Mediterranean and land access to the Po Valley. The new post-reconstruction settlement probably had its center no longer on the hill, but in an intermediate area between it and the port, between the present Via di San Bernardo and Via di Canneto il Lungo, in the Molo sestiere.

The author and traveler Henry Aubert, in his essay Cities and People of Italy (Villes et gens d'Italie, published in Paris in 1923), provides a concise portrait of the historic center of a city-emporium, defined as nothing more than a marketplace with no political importance. Aubert cannot help but quote the geographer Strabo when the latter stated how in Genoa nothing was sold but honey, cattle, hides, wine, and oil. Aubert believed that the historic city occupied the same geographical position as the time in which he was writing, between the Lighthouse (not the Lanterna, but the old lighthouse on the pier that illuminated the entrance to the port in antiquity), which dates from Roman times, and the hill of Carignano on one side, the sea and the fort called Castelletto today on the other.

The writer states:

It included the oppidum, now the Molo district, with its narrow streets (n. : it refers to the caruggi) full of people, the heart and cradle of the city, which foreigners rarely visit, and in which there is at least one beautiful thing: the ancient and unique church of Santa Maria di Castello, which was the first cathedral of Genoa, and where lovers of historical memories can find interesting things (n. : Our Lady was crowned queen of Genoa in 1657); the Neapolis, situated behind the Oppidum, in a gorge where only the connoisseurs and the intrepid curious dare to venture; the Statio, or military city, which later became the residential city, and finally the Emporium, the raison d'être of all the rest, the active city, of trade and commerce...

He concludes:

This is the most characteristic part of modern Genoa, the part where the medieval life took place, the part that makes it resemble Naples with its intricate, sloping streets and the gray color of its slate roofs...

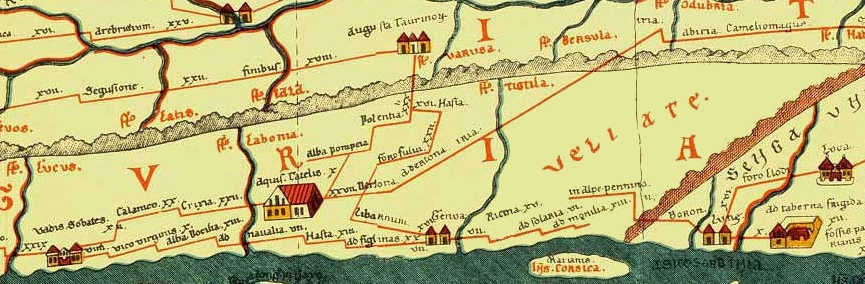
The surroundings of Genoa in the Tabula Peutingeriana, an ancient Roman map showing the military routes of the Empire (here in a copy from the late 19th century). Genoa is marked as a supply station.

In the Corvetto Square area, during construction work on some buildings (in the fall of 2011), the remains of a farm from the Roman period (2nd century BC) were found. According to early research there would also be traces of canalization, in which water taken from streams originating from the Righi area flowed, and the terrain would show the presence of terracing.

After the reconstruction the city's port, and consequently the city itself, grew in importance. In 147 B.C. the Roman consul Postumius Albinus began the construction of the Via Postumia, which connected Genoa with Aquileia, equipped with a river port accessible from the Adriatic Sea. Genoa then became, during the reign of Gaius Julius Caesar, the most important port in Cisalpine Gaul.

Finds and research in recent decades suggest that Genoa was crossed by a number of Roman roads, the route of which, however, is not certain and may have changed over time. One of the hypotheses involves the bifurcation of the road coming from the east at the height of the necropolis in the present-day Acquasola area: from there one road would have transited between the hill of Sant'Andrea and the hill of Castello, then reaching the harbor area and skirting the shore, while the second would have taken a more northerly route, through what would become the sestieri of Portoria and Maddalena, rejoining the former in the latter and continuing towards the west.

The city of Genoa is featured in the Tabula Peutingeriana, a medieval reproduction of a Roman map, which showed the main routes of the Empire, and which is believed to have been compiled in later stages, probably starting in the second century B.C. (the Via Aemilia Scauri, built only in 109 B.C., being omitted from it). Strabo in his Geographica (book IV, chapter 6), published in its first version a few years before the end of the 1st century BC, calls Genoa "the emporium of the Ligurians." The city is also mentioned as an oppidum in the list concerning the Ligurian region that Pliny the Elder compiled in the third chapter of his Naturalis historia, situating it between the Porcifera and Fertor rivers (normally identified with the Polcevera and Bisagno streams):

Flumen Rutuba, oppidum Album Intimilium, flumen Merula, oppidum Album Ingaunum, portus Vadorum Sabatium, flumen Porcifera, oppidum Genua, fluvius Fertor, portus Delphini, Tigulia intus, Segesta Tiguliorum, flumen Macra, Liguriae finis.

— Pliny the Elder, Naturalis historia, Liber III

While the construction of the Via Aemilia Scauri cut off the city and the entire coast from direct trade to southern France (then part of the Roman province of Gallia Narbonensis), it had probably prevented the territory from being caught up in the passage of armies in the subsequent civil wars of 49–45 B.C. and 44-31 B.C.

A certain regularity in the streets that make up the medieval historic center (roughly comprised between present-day Via San Lorenzo, Via Filippo Turati, Salita Pollaioli and the hill of Castello) and the fact that even the few finds of buildings of Roman origin unearthed in the area seem to have an orientation compatible with this arrangement, has led to the assumption that a military encampment existed in the area, from whose shape the neighborhood would have developed. However, there is no firm evidence to support this hypothesis.

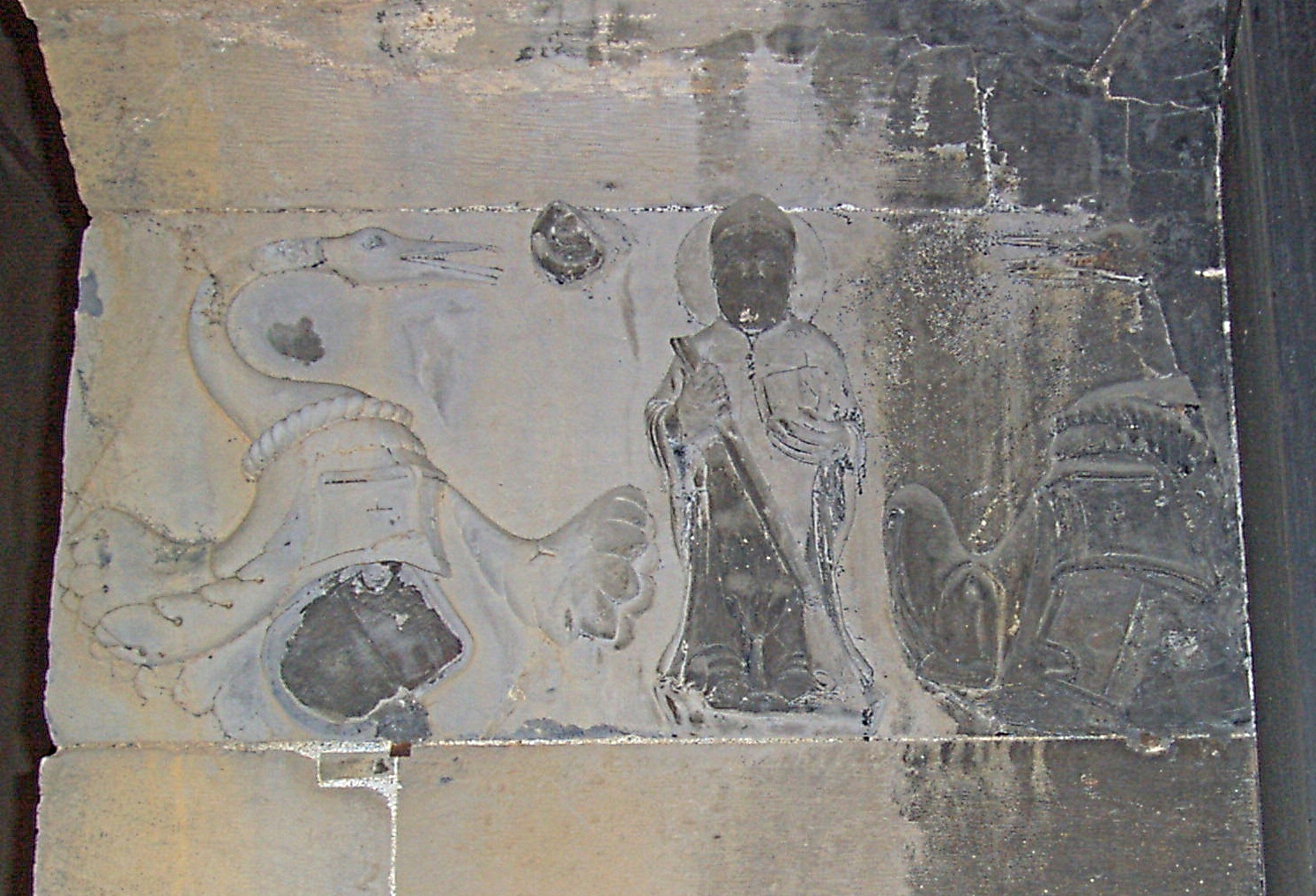
Romanesque relief depicting Saint Syrus and some heraldic symbols, in Vico San Pietro della Porta

The remains of a Roman domus were found in the area of today's Matteotti Square (near the Ducal Palace). Excavations in the area, carried out on several occasions since 1975, identified the first use of the area in the final period of the Roman Republic (1st century B.C.) The building, passing through numerous modifications and periods of decay, would remain in use until the 7th century. According to the findings, the area would have undergone heavy modifications in the 12th and 13th centuries, when a cemetery was created connected to the nearby church of St. Ambrose, but by that time the walls that made up the building had probably already collapsed. An epigraph dedicated to Fortuna Redux was also found in the excavations, probably belonging to some religious building or monument that existed in the area in Roman times. A short distance from the remains of the domus, adjacent to the corner of the church of St. Ambrose, the remains of a water pipe, made (or perhaps simply restored) in the 3rd century, were found during the same excavations. Other finds, from the Republican and even later periods, were made in nearby areas, such as those in 1986 in the area occupied by the Scuole Pie Church.

After the beginning of the Christian era, some legends, taken up by medieval and Renaissance writers such as Jacobus de Voragine and Agostino Schiaffino, have it that St. Peter and Saints Nazarius and Celsus passed through the city during the first century. Another legend has it that St. Lawrence and Pope Sixtus II stopped in the city on their way to Spain, being housed in a house located in the area of today's Cathedral of St. Lawrence, where, after their killing, a chapel and then a church dedicated to the saint would rise. Based on archaeological findings, a stable Christian community was certainly present in the mid-3rd century and used the very area of St. Lawrence as its burial place (but the cemetery that was present was already used in Roman times), however, there is no certainty about the identity and exact sequence of the first bishops of the city's diocese, the best known of whom is St. Syrus. By his work, or that of his predecessor Felice, the construction of Genoa's first cathedral, initially dedicated to the Twelve Apostles and from the sixth century to St. Syrus himself, would be begun in the area west of the civitas.

=== The early Middle Ages ===
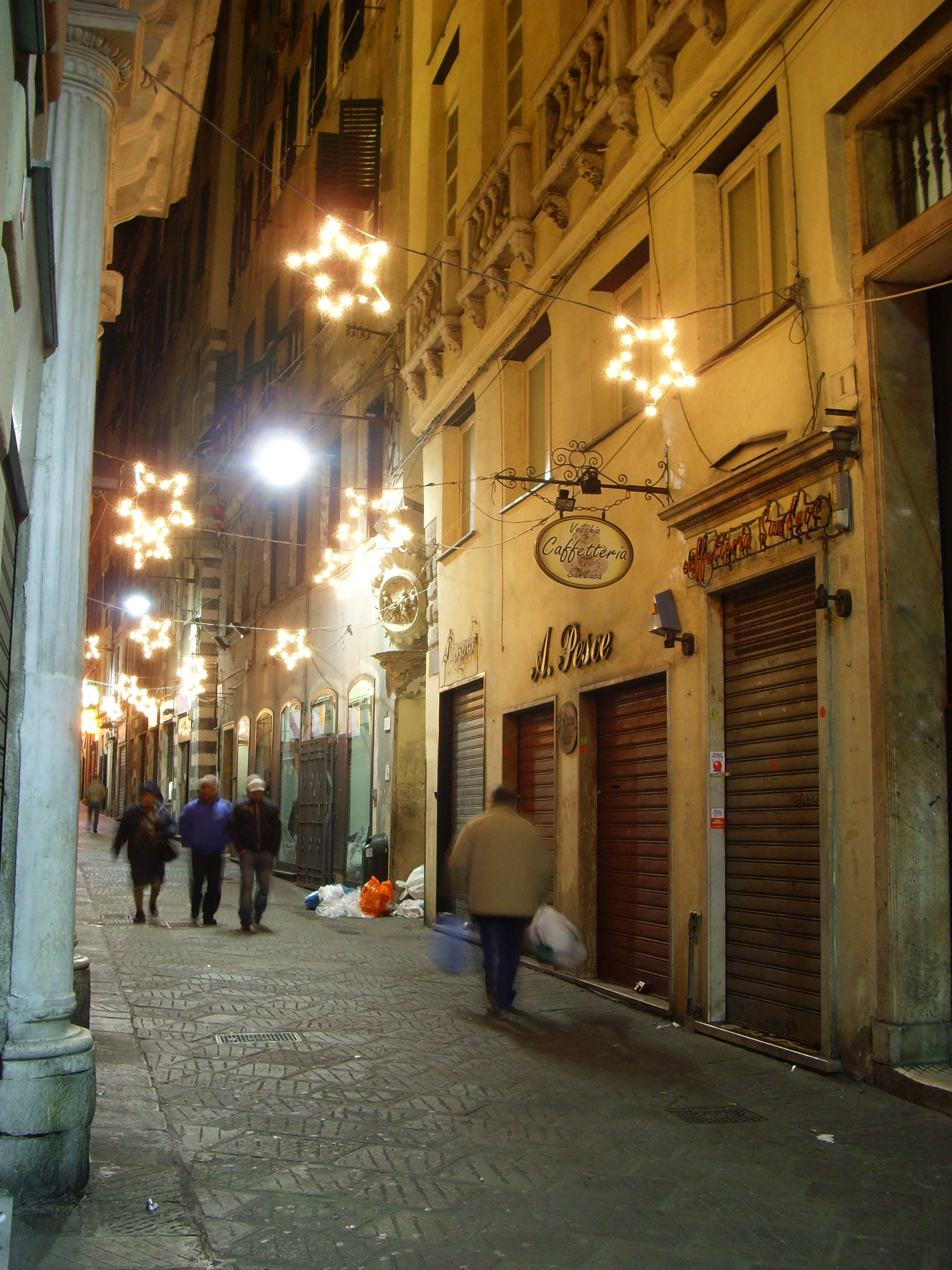
Via San Luca in the evening at Christmas time. The medieval street (formerly known as carrubeo recto) connected the center of the city (civitas) with the area of the church of San Siro (burgus), until the 9th century the cathedral of Genoa, and had numerous porticoes, which later disappeared in the renovations of the palaces that took place from the 15th century onward. Along the street and in the adjacent areas were the palaces of the Grimaldi and Spinola families.

Due to some letters (dated 507 and 511) by which Theodoric the Great granted the restoration of an old synagogue, there is information about the presence of a Jewish community in the city in the early 6th century.

In 569 the curia of Milan, ruled by Honoratus Castiglioni, fleeing from the Lombard king Alboin, found refuge in Genoa, where it remained for about 80 years. The curia settled in the area of what is now Piazza Matteotti, building a church there, dedicated to St. Ambrose, patron saint of Milan, which over the centuries became the present Church of Jesus and Saints Ambrose and Andrew.

According to reports two centuries later by Paul the Deacon in his Historia Langobardorum, at the same time as the descent of the Lombards into Italy, in the 670s, Liguria was struck by a plague, which caused numerous deaths and the abandonment of cities and pastures in the countryside as the inhabitants fled:

Huius temporibus in provincia praecipue Liguriae maxima pestilentia exorta est. [...] Nam, ut vulgi rumor habebat, fugientes cladem vitare, relinquebantur domus desertae habitatoribus, solis catulis domum servantibus. Peculia sola remanebant in pascuis, nullo adstante pastore. Cerneres pridem villas seu castra repleta agminibus hominum, postero vero die universis fugientibus cuncta esse in summo silentio.
At that time, a very great plague was spreading, especially in the province of Liguria. [...] Since it was rumored among the people that the only way to avoid the slaughter was to flee, houses were abandoned: devoid of inhabitants, they were guarded only by dogs; even cattle remained only in the pastures, for there were no shepherds left. Villas and castles, which had just been crowded with people, were to be seen the next day in gloomy silence, after everyone had fled.

— Paul the Deacon, Historia Langobardorum, volume 1

Between 641 and 643, the Lombard king Rothari conquered Liguria and assaulted, among others, the city of Genoa, sacking and burning some areas of it, and probably destroying the walls already present, about whose actual existence, extent and position in this historical period, however, there is no shared opinion among scholars. According to several historians there were in fact defensive works present, predating those about whose existence there is certainty (due to visible remains or historical documentation), from the time of the earliest pre-Roman settlements, but for none of these fortifications is there certain evidence of their actual existence, eventual location and extent, or their eventual modification over time.

Following the annexation to the Lombard kingdom, Bishop Forte fled the city, taking shelter with the Pope in Rome, and it would be his successor, St. John the Good (a descendant of a noble family from the Gulf of Paradise), who brought the seat of the curia of Milan back to the city of origin, although on the date of Forte's departure from Genoa and this relocation there is no unambiguousness in the sources.

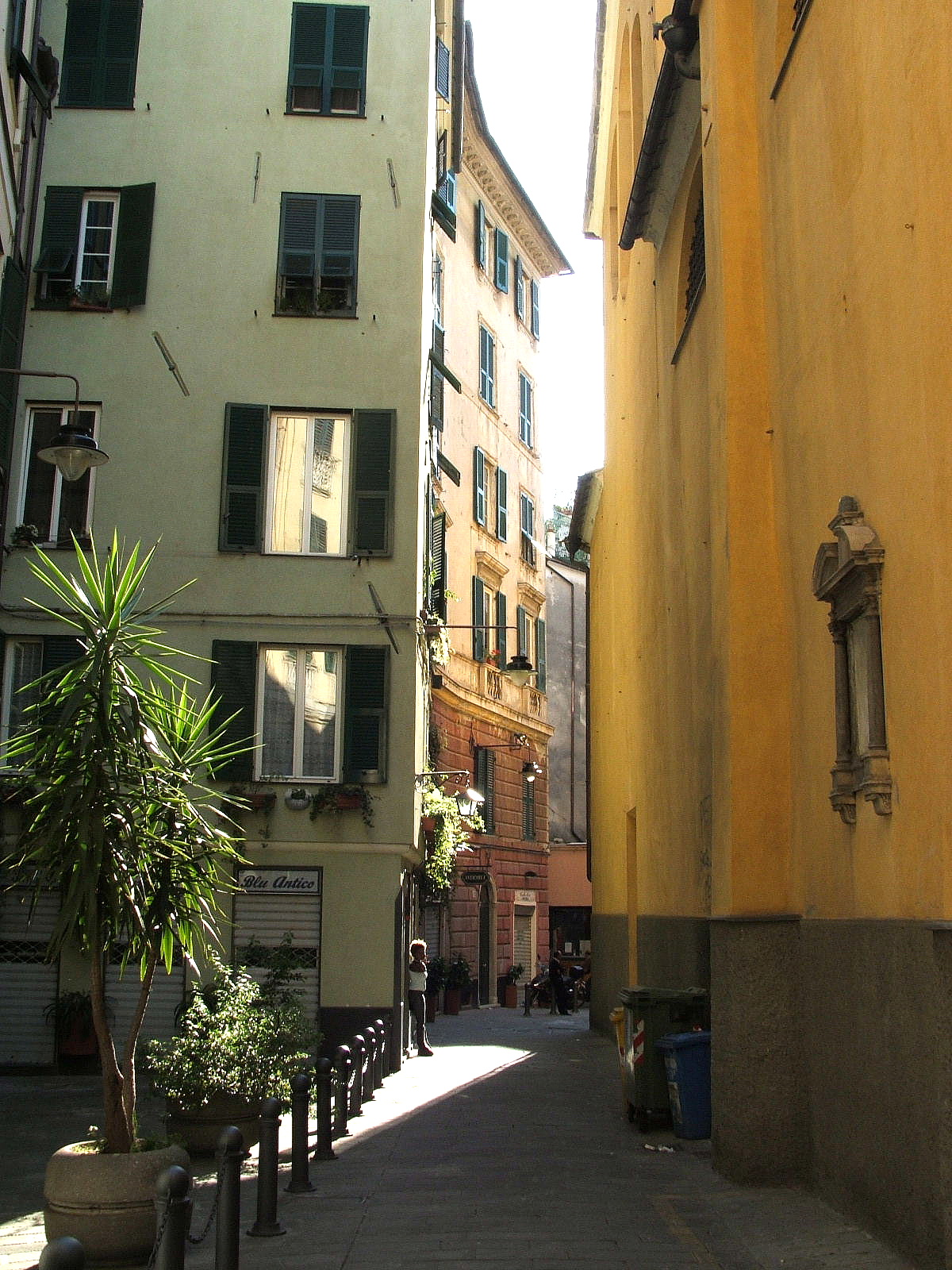
Via della Maddalena in the afternoon. The street, the nearby square and the sestiere of the same name are named after the ancient church of Santa Maria Maddalena, which has been present in the area since before the year 1000. It was not until the 12th century, with the construction of the Barbarossa walls, that the area was included within the defensive walls of the urban area.

After the destruction of the walls by Rothari, the expansion of ancient Genoa and the need to defend itself from the assaults of enemies, as had been the Lombards first and the Saracens later, would lead, starting a few centuries before the year one thousand, to the construction of several walls, of increasingly wider radius, to protect the built-up area, which in later centuries, when not included in new defense works, would be incorporated by the built-up area itself, demolished or buried to make room for new buildings.

Between 848 and 889 a first new city wall was built, partly with the financial help of the Carolingians, equipped with four gates (Porta San Pietro, Serravalle, Castri and Soprana gates) and four towers (Castelletto, Luccoli, Castello and Friolente), encompassing an area of about 20 hectares. Francesco Maria Accinelli, a Genoese historian of the eighteenth century, reports the expansion of the city wall, with the creation of the four gates, in 925 or, as he reports, according to other sources in 935. This did not prevent the city from again falling victim, in the following decades, to assaults by Saracen forces, which in 935 managed to reach and sack even the church of San Siro.

In 862 there are sources attesting to the presence of Benedictine monks, reporting to the Abbey of St. Columbanus of Bobbio, at the church of San Pietro della Porta (where San Pietro in Banchi now stands). Later they would be entrusted with the church of St. Stephen, also outside the walls, whose construction had been decided by Bishop Theodulf.

In the third decade of the 10th century, the city was attacked and sacked several times by Saracen pirates (in 930, 934, 935 and 936), who took numerous prisoners, although the Genoese fleet managed to intercept the Arab ships after the last reprisal, freeing fellow citizens captured during this last attack. It was precisely the continuous assaults that were among the reasons that, in 985, led the bishop of Genoa to transfer the episcopal see from the church of San Siro (at the time named after the Twelve Apostles), to that of San Lorenzo, inside the then existing walls.

In the mid-10th century Berengar II of Ivrea, King of Italy, divided the north into three marches, entrusting the one that included Genoa and eastern Liguria to Oberto I (Marca Obertenga, later called Marca Januensis). In the struggle between Berengar and Otto of Saxony, Marquis Oberto sided with the latter, while the city of Genoa swore allegiance to Berengar and his son Adalbert, thus obtaining a diploma in 958 declaring the city and the possessions of its citizens independent from "duke, marquis and count, sculdascio, dean or any other great or small person of our kingdom." These concessions allowed the city to officially, though not fully, gain a form of political independence.

Prior to the construction of the city walls in the 12th century (known as the Barbarossa walls, with a perimeter four times as large as the previous ones), three zones were distinguished in the city: the castrum, i.e., the area of the initial settlement around Sarzano; the ripa area, where traffic and activities related to the port took place; and finally the burgus, outside the walls, where the first cathedral was located, the church of San Siro, which still exists today, although it has been partially destroyed and rebuilt several times. The construction of the walls, in addition to incorporating the peripheral area of the church of San Siro into the city, also included the area (closer to the previous circle of walls) of the Basilica of Santa Maria delle Vigne, which had risen about three centuries earlier in an area called Vigne del Re, a name that would attest to the probable presence of vineyards immediately outside the previous city center. The cultivation of vineyards and the presence of some chestnut groves, would also be confirmed by a document from 886, which describes the area as owned by the monks of St. Peter's Church, the clergymen of St. Syrus Cathedral and the family of the viscount (vicecomes) Ydo.

=== The emergence of the Compagna Communis and the late Middle Ages ===
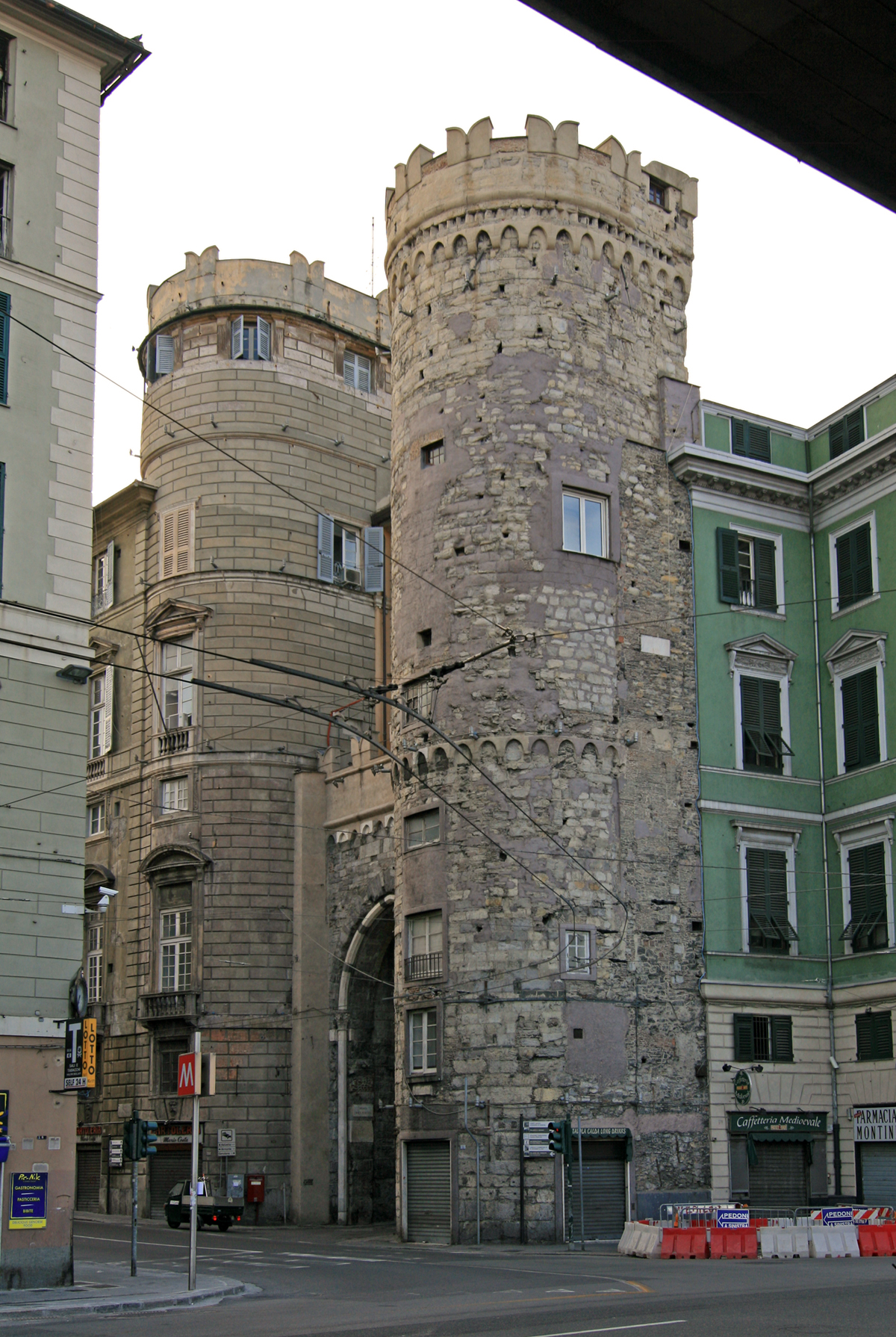
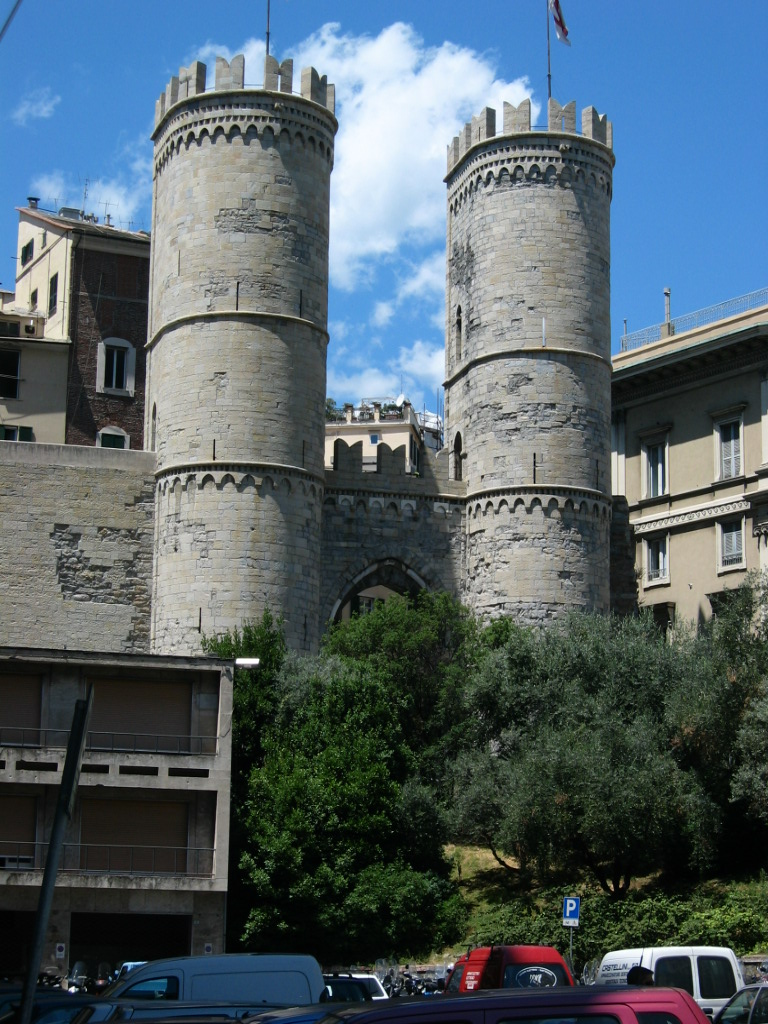
On the left Porta dei Vacca (originally Porta di Santa Fede, due to the presence of a church of the same name nearby, later renamed as dei Vacca, after the Vachero family who owned a palace in the area). The gate was built between 1155 and 1159 as part of the "Barbarossa walls," but the subsequent expansion of the perimeter of the walls, with the construction of a new wall in the 14th century, meant that the defensive function of the gate was lost and the area became residential. In 1601 Palazzo Lomellini-Serra was attached to the south tower, whose owners (the Lomellini family, who purchased the tower in 1630), were bound not to change its volume. Instead, in 1644 the north tower was joined to the structure of the Marc'Aurelio Rebuffo palace.
On the right is Porta Soprana (formerly Porta di Sant'Andrea), located on the Piano di Sant'Andrea, also part of the 13th-century circle of walls. Together with the coeval (and originally almost identical) Porta dei Vacca, it represented one of the main entrances to the town in the Middle Ages. The building, incorporated during the centuries by the adjacent constructions and enlarged with the construction of some rooms located in two floors placed between the towers, was later restored to a shape more similar to the original one as part of the renovation works in the area that took place at the turn of the 19th and 20th centuries. It is one of Genoa's best-known landmark buildings, along with the Lighthouse and the Bigo.

This last period of expansion, at the turn of the early and late Middle Ages, saw the first agreements between the city's powers, which would give rise to the Compagna Communis (Caffaro attests its existence in 1099, but the precise year of its establishment is unknown), which would in turn be the basis on which the municipality would be born, and the elevation of the diocese of Genoa to the rank of metropolitan archdiocese (on 20 March 1133, after Genoa's support for Pope Innocent II against Antipope Anacletus II). The compagne into which Genoa was divided, corresponding to as many areas of the ancient city, documented as seven in 1130 and eight in 1134, were Castello, Maccagnana, Piazzalunga, San Lorenzo, Della Porta, Soziglia, Pré and Porta Nuova (the eighth added).

Beginning in 1125 the Sottoripa arcades were built, of which, after centuries of modifications, demolitions and reconstructions, a significant section still exists on the edge of Caricamento square and Turati street. The original route of the arcade covered the route from Porta dei Vacca (a few decades after the beginning of the construction of the arcades) to the area of the new pier (today's Piazza Cavour), all within a few meters of the piers.

At that time the area was filled with stores and inns that for a period also occupied the front of the arcades, making them a kind of gallery. Despite the changes that the buildings underwent, on some of the facades, immediately above the arches of the arcade, traces of the old city aqueduct are visible.

Historian Federico Donaver, in his 1912 Le Vie di Genova, describes the area in medieval times as follows:

In the Middle Ages, the most glorious expeditions of the Republic left from the port, which was the main landing place. Here were built the ships, the slaughterhouses and the houses of the Embriaci, the Malloni and the Castello.

— Federico Donaver, Le Vie di Genova – Notizie storiche e curiose ad uso del popolo e delle scuole, Libreria Editrice Moderna, Genova, 1912

As already mentioned, Barbarossa's sights on Italy led to the construction of a new defensive wall much larger than the previous one, the construction work on which was begun in 1155 and, after a brief pause, resumed in 1158. After a few centuries, to differentiate them from the later walls, they took the common name of old walls.

Initially, not all of the area within the walls was built on, as there were numerous vegetable gardens and land free of buildings owned by the various noble families and monasteries present. It was not until the following century that the urbanization of the city was completed, characterized by a geometrically more regular layout than in the older areas, and with the quarters for artisans and merchants concentrated in the outlying areas.

The city was not unaffected by the clashes between Guelphs and Ghibellines that took place from the 12th century, which intersected with the internal political rivalries of the various noble families (among the Guelph and predominant ones, called rampini, were the Fieschi and Grimaldi families; among the Ghibelline ones, called mascherati, were the Doria and Spinola families) and with the war against Ghibelline Pisa. The hostilities, in addition to causing turmoil in the city (fires originating from the clashes heavily damaged the church of San Lorenzo in 1296 and completely destroyed the church of San Pietro in Banchi in 1398), would also affect inland and coastal towns under the control of the aforementioned noble families. Fire was one of the recurring threats to the buildings in the historic center: between the beginning of the 12th century and the middle of the 13th century, several districts were severely damaged, if not destroyed, by flames. Among the causes were the high density of buildings and the use of wood (typically chestnut), both for the interiors of houses and to raise existing stone and limestone buildings with new floors.

In 1260 the people's captain Guglielmo Boccanegra had the first nucleus of the Palazzo San Giorgio (visible on the present rear of the palace) built in the harbor area as the seat of the municipality. Two years later, with the deposition of Boccanegra, the seat of the Municipality would be suppressed. On the sides of the palace, the piers ponte dei legni (later ponte della mercanzia) and ponte del pedaggio (later ponte reale) would later be built. With the return of the captains of the people in 1271, the Municipality would be moved to the building that formed the original nucleus of the present Doge's Palace, then owned by Count Alberto Fieschi of Lavagna. The Fieschi family had sought to build a palace in the central area of the city, buying some houses from the Dorias, buildings that were located between Piazza San Matteo and the Serravalle gate (belonging to the 9th-century walls, located next to the Cathedral of San Lorenzo). The municipality would officially acquire the building in 1294 and would further expand and modify it in the following centuries. The title of "Ducal" would be assigned only with the beginning of the republic of doges in 1339, the first of whom would be Simone Boccanegra, great-grandson of the captain of the people Guglielmo and from a family of wealthy merchants, called by acclamation to the position by the popular party, in opposition to the patrician party that had ruled the city until then. Among his first decisions was the exile for some of the patrician families (mainly Guelphs) who had opposed him and his supporters and the decision that representatives of noble families historically involved in the struggles between the two factions should be precluded from the dogate. As a result of this reform, new merchant families gained power, the so-called Cappellazzi, but they, too, soon proved to be dedicated to intrigue and violence. The office, initially planned for life, in fact turned out to be much shorter, both for Boccanegra and his successors.

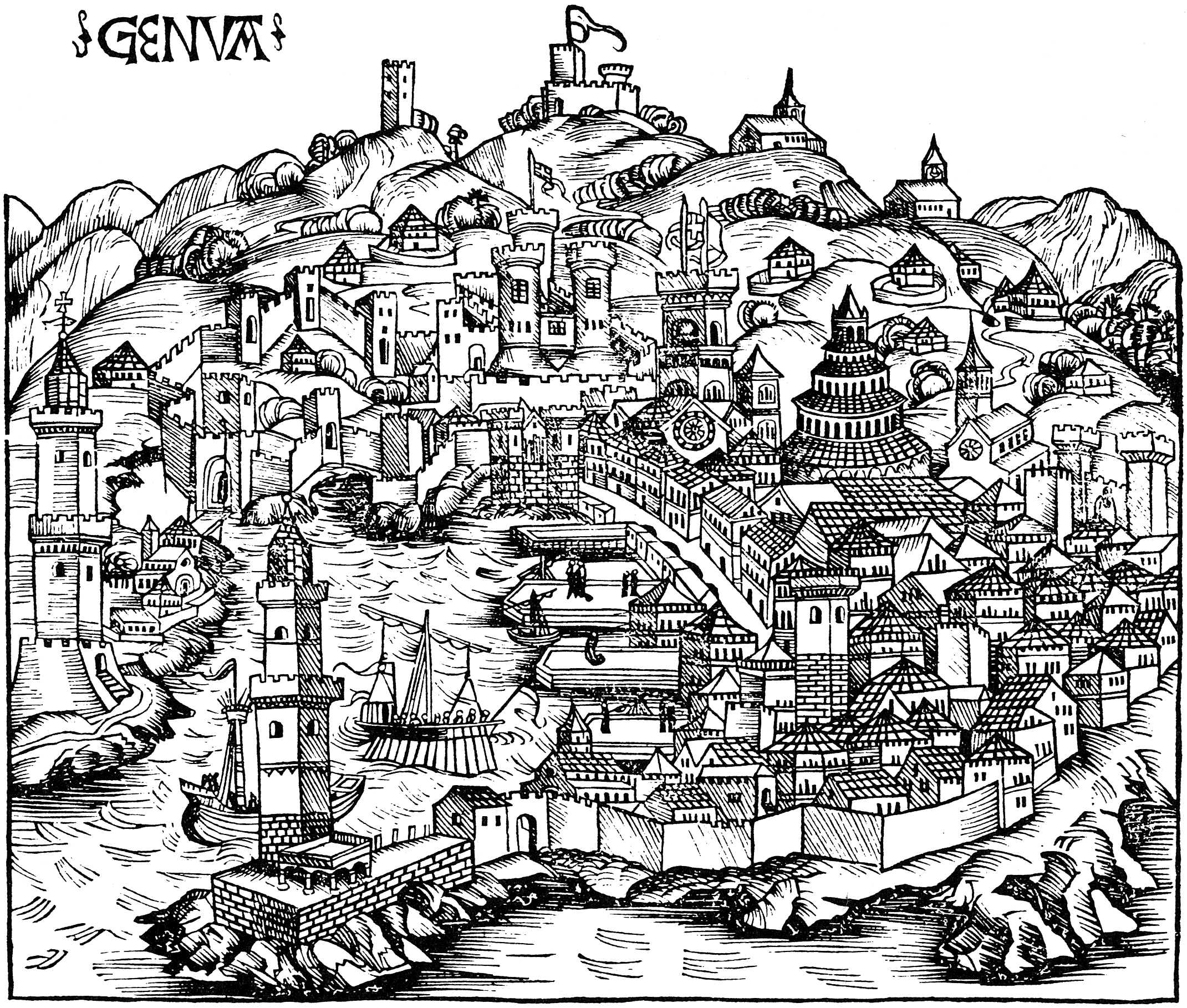
Genoa in the late 15th century in a period woodcut published in Hartmann Schedel's Nuremberg Chronicle, published in Nuremberg in 1493. In depictions of the time, the buildings that were the seat of ecclesiastical and civil power were depicted larger than their actual size to highlight their importance. The two beacons of access to the port are visible: on the right of the image is the tower of the Greeks, located at the end of the old pier, and, on the left, the tower that overlooked the promontory then located in front of the present district of San Benigno, incorporated into the port area. The tower of the old pier, built in the mid-1820s, was reduced to half height in 1575 to allow the placement of a battery to defend the harbor. Demolished in the following centuries and replaced in the first decades of the 19th century by the "lantern," placed at the end of the pier extension built at that time, the lighthouse and end part of the pier in turn were demolished in 1929, to facilitate access to the port for large ships. The present "Lighthouse" on the other hand, whose construction dates back to 1543, was built on the ruins of the western one, damaged by friendly fire in the 1513 clashes between Andrea Doria and the French occupiers.

During the Battle of Meloria in August 1284, the Genoese fleet captured some 9,000 soldiers and sailors of the republic of Pisa, locking them up in an area located in the vicinity of the walls and harbor, which to this day bears the name of the Pisan camp. The Pisan Republic did not honor the agreements made after the defeat, and a new Genoese fleet attacked and sacked the Pisan harbor and adjoining areas in August 1290: among the items brought back home were parts of the chain that, for defensive purposes, closed the Tuscan port, broken by the Genoese, and which, divided, were displayed in some of the gates of the walls and in several churches and noble villas. The chains remained in Genoa until the approach of the unification of Italy, when (in 1860), as a sign of appeasement, they were returned to the city of Pisa.

In the second half of the 14th century, the Alberghi were created, a union of noble families who shared both spheres of influence in the city's political and commercial life and real estate holdings found in the same areas of Genoa. In the following centuries their existence would be marked by several reforms, the result of infighting between families and the emergence of new powers. In the same period the Republic was involved in the war of Chioggia, against its rival Venice, a clash of fluctuating course that, although short-lived (1378–1381), would cost both maritime republics a great deal in terms of resources employed. Several buildings in the historic center incorporated architectural details that were the result of looting during the war, such as the lions of St. Mark found on the side of the church of San Marco al Molo and on the facade of Palazzo Marcantonio Giustiniani, both from Istrian Pula.

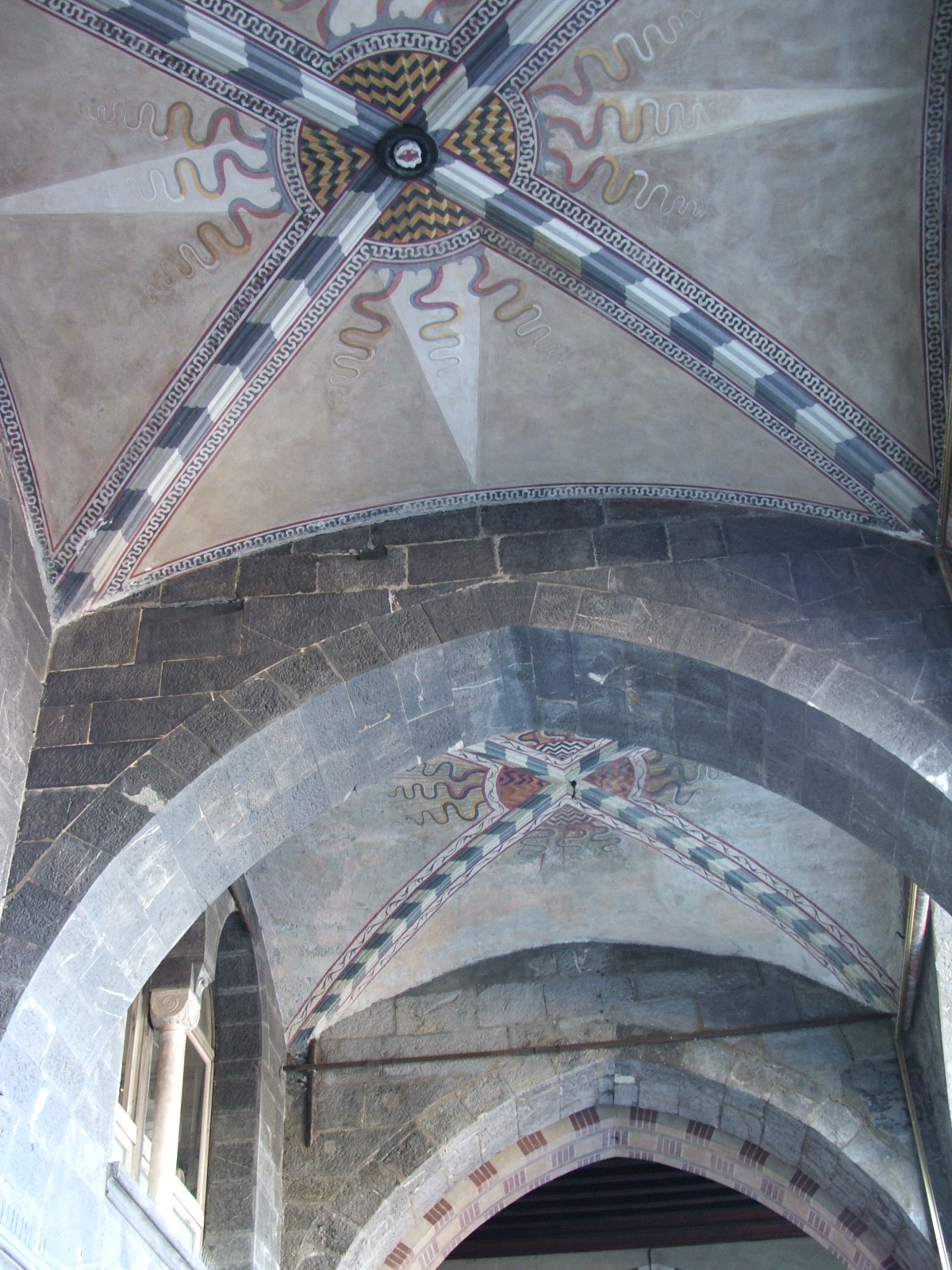
Porticoes of Sottoripa, detail of the ceiling of the porticoes. The oldest porticoes date back to the 12th century and were modified several times over the centuries. In the second half of the 19th century Alfredo d'Andrade oversaw the restoration of the porticoes, removing the mezzanines that had been built in the meantime, so as to reproduce the ceilings with their cross vaults and ribs from view.

Between the end of the 14th and the 15th centuries, a real red-light district was created in Genoa, in the area where Castelletto (Monte Albano) is now located, in which prostitution (previously widespread in brothels distributed haphazardly in different parts of the city, not without friction with the ecclesiastical power) was strictly regulated. The taxation from this activity was redeployed almost entirely for maintenance works and the expansion of the port. During this period (on 23 April 1407, to be precise) the Bank of Saint George was founded, which had its headquarters in the palace of the same name: created at the behest of the city's French governor Jean II Le Maingre, it would remain in operation for about four centuries, until it was dissolved by Napoleon. The initial purpose of the institution was to manage the enormous public debt of the republic, unifying the various societies that had previously taken care of it. This was a period of crisis for the republic, which would last until the early 16th century, with doges often being the expression of foreign powers: first the Milan of the Visconti and later the Sforza, and France. Foreign control over politics and constant internal struggles, however, did not put a brake on continued building growth and renovation of pre-existing areas, and in Via San Luca, then the main route from the center to the western edge of the city, the palaces of the Spinola, Grimaldi, Pinelli, and Lomellini families were built.

In 1493 a first group of Sephardic Jews driven out of Spain arrived in Genoa and were forced to settle in the area of Via del Campo and Piazzetta Fregoso. Jewish immigration to the city in these decades consisted largely of former merchants and traders who, in the new situation prevailing in the Iberian Peninsula under the reign of Ferdinand II of Aragon, who was adverse to the Jews, had seen much of their wealth disappear in a short time. Almost two centuries later, starting in 1658, this area, near the church of Santa Sabina and part of the Prè sestiere, would become Genoa's first Jewish ghetto. The collapse of the Genoese population that had occurred a few years earlier due to the plague, with the related demand for new labor and commercial skills, had made it possible for Jews to obtain Genoese citizenship, albeit with severe limitations: with the establishment of the ghetto, the alleys and streets that allowed access to the area were closed off by gates, and among the obligations imposed on the population living there was that of attending masses held in the nearby churches of San Siro and delle Vigne. However, in contrast to what was happening in the same period in other cities located on Italian territory, the constant humiliation and provocation to which the Jewish population was subjected almost never resulted in explicit acts of violence. This area, popularly still called "the ghetto," is one of the most degraded in the historic center, often in the news for the widespread transsexual prostitution that takes place in its caruggi. In the early years of the 21st century, a project to redevelop the area was financed by the municipality.

=== From the Renaissance to the end of the Republic of Genoa ===
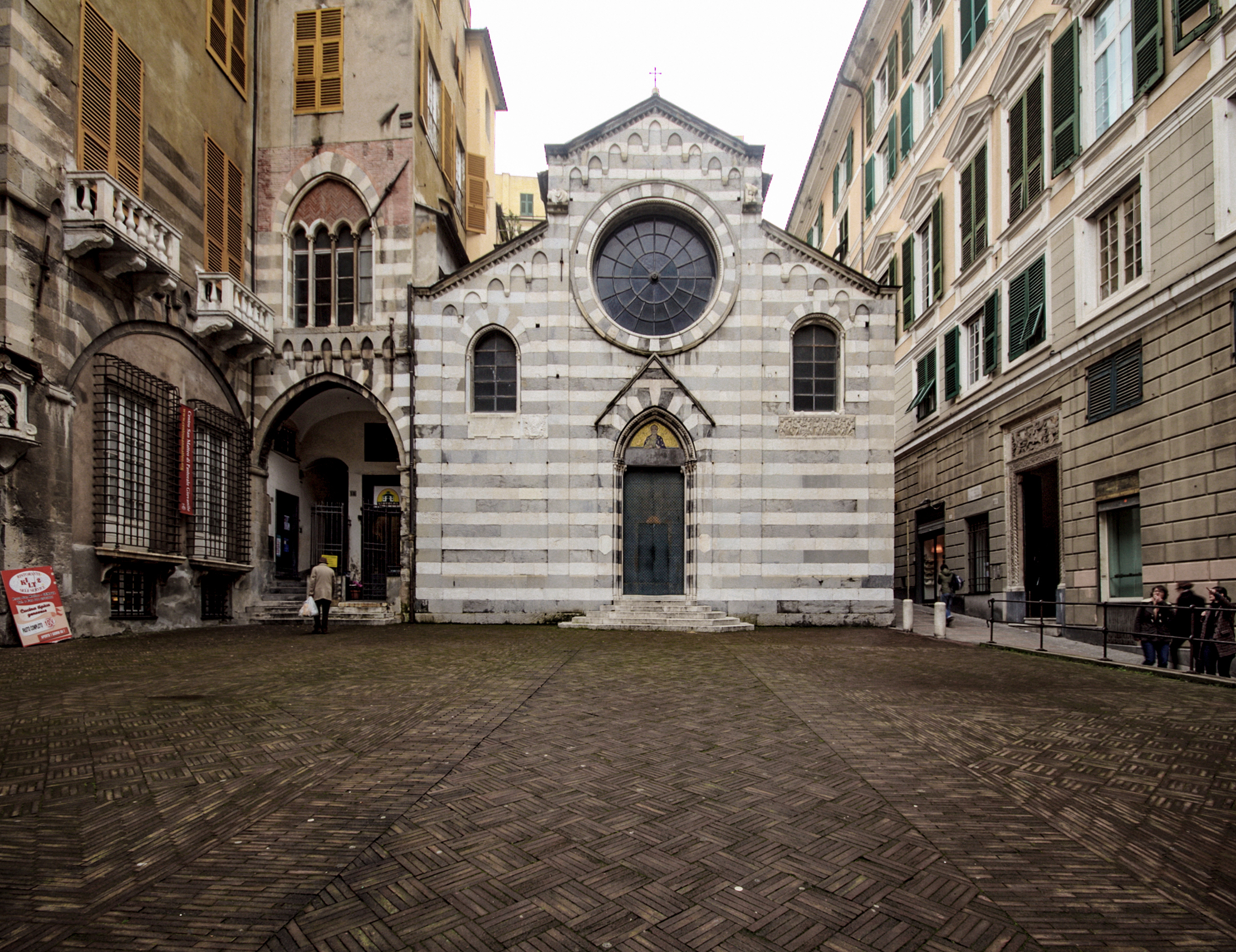
In the center is the church of San Matteo, in the 16th-century square of the same name, with part of the Branca Doria palace on the left and the Doria-Danovaro palace on the right. The original church, founded by the Doria family, dates from 1125, but was heavily modified at first in the late 13th century and then in the mid-16th century. The staircase that gives access to the area in front of the church was built in 1935, upon completion of some restoration work on the square, in place of the two previous stairways. Several members of the Doria family had their town residences in this area. The typical façade with white (marble) and black (slate) stripes can be seen: the republic of Genoa allowed only four families (the Doria, Spinola, Grimaldi and Fieschi) to have buildings in which this decoration was present on all floors and not only up to the first.

The 16th century, with the rebirth of the Republic of Genoa by Andrea Doria, was a period of strong expansion, known as "El siglo de los Genoveses" ("The Century of the Genoese"). Symbolizing this period of growth in the Maddalena sestiere, on behalf of some of the leading noble Genoese families of the time (Spinola, Grimaldi, Lomellini, Pallavicini, Brignole Sale and Lercari), the Strada Nuova, today's Via Garibaldi, about 250 m long, with its stately palaces, was planned and then built, in which, starting in 1576, the Rolli system was established. The work took about 40 years to complete: from the acquisition of the land in 1551 (construction work would start a few years later, however, in 1558) to the completion of the final paving in 1591.

Regarding the construction of Via Garibaldi in place of the pre-existing medieval quarter, a symbol of the strong desire for renewal at that time, Donaver, in his Le Vie di Genova, quoting in turn the 18th-century Francesco Maria Accinelli, wrote:

Accinelli tells us that between Maddalena and San Francesco di Castelletto and Fonte Moroso there were many notorious shanties, which in 1551 the fathers of the municipality bought for 5000 lire and demolished. The land was sold to more wealthy families who built splendid palaces along a wide street called first "Aurea" and later "Strada nuova". The latter name was kept until a few years ago, when a municipal decree changed it to the name of the Hero of the Two Worlds.

— Federico Donaver, Le Vie di Genova – Notizie storiche e curiose ad uso del popolo e delle scuole, Libreria Editrice Moderna, Genova, 1912

Also contributing to this prosperity was the economic link with the Spanish crown, whose investments needed for the wars in which it was involved in Europe were partly financed by Genoese bankers, who could thus enjoy strong income from interest.

The construction of the "Strada Nuova" was just one of the works carried out in that period, which saw at work architects such as Galeazzo Alessi (his works include the Basilica of Santa Maria Assunta in Carignano, the bell tower and dome of the cathedral of San Lorenzo and the design of Porta Siberia) or sculptors such as Taddeo Carlone (his works include several portals of the palaces built at the time, such as that of Palazzo Doria-Spinola). Also from the same period are the construction of the Loggia dei Mercanti and the church of San Pietro in Banchi (on the area occupied by the earlier church of San Pietro della Porta, which was destroyed in 1398) in the Molo district. At the turn of the 16th and 17th centuries, the long and troubled construction of the basilica of Santissima Annunziata del Vastato also took place, begun in 1520 with the covering of the Vastato stream and finished only in the mid-17th century.

The following century saw the building of a new set of walls, the Mura Nuove (built between 1626 and 1639), which was not limited like the previous ones to encircling the built-up area because of the need to encompass new areas within it, but provided for the existence of a free space between it and the new route of the walls for mainly defensive purposes. These included the Fronti Basse on the Bisagno River. The construction of the new walls brought the area of the town included within the walls from the 197 hectares of the old walls built until the 16th century to the 903 hectares of the new structure.

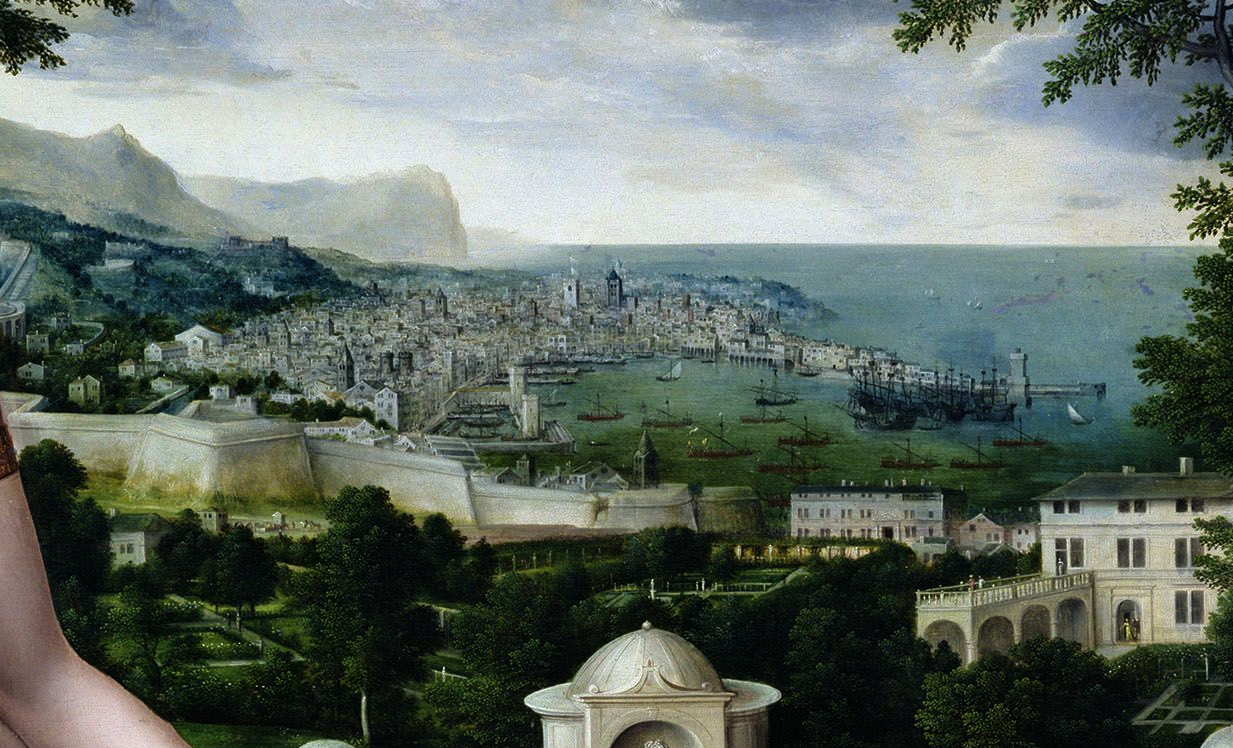
Detail of Venus van Cythera, by Jan Matsys (1561), showing a view of the city of Genoa. Part of the Prince's palace, built for Admiral Andrea Doria, can be seen in the right foreground, while the dock area is evident in the center of the port arch.

In the early 17th century, Via Balbi or Balbi street (named after the Genoese noble family of the same name) was also built. Of Via Balbi the first part survives, uphill (about 400 m long), on either side of which stand important and majestic palaces (including the Royal Palace also known as Palazzo Stefano Balbi), home to several humanities faculties and offices of the University of Genoa and some museums; a second part, which continued toward Piazza Acquaverde (in the area where the Genoa-Principe station is located, about 315 m long, was demolished in the mid-19th century to allow the passage of the Turin-Genoa railway.

At this time in some buildings in the harbor area, more precisely in the dock area, a mosque was built, which would remain active for about two centuries (from the early 17th century to the end of the 18th century), for the use of the slaves, merchants, artisans and intellectuals of the Islamic religion present in the city. A pillar of the original place of worship can be found in the library of the Faculty of Business and Economics, whose location, as of 1996, is the building resulting from the numerous remodeling that has taken place over the centuries on the volumes of the original building.

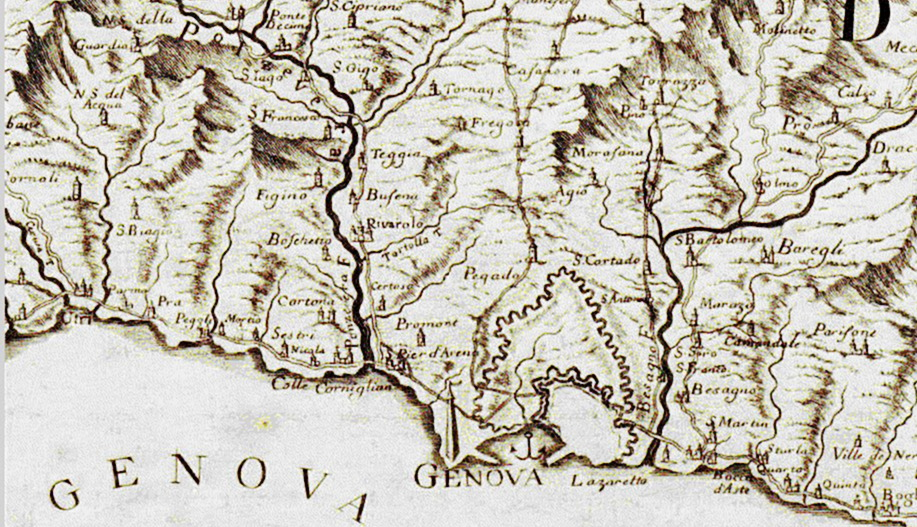
The surroundings of Genoa in Giovanni Tommaso Borgonio's map (made in 1683 and later updated in 1772). The two walls protecting the town are noted.

After its establishment in the 17th century, the Jewish ghetto was also moved for a short time to the vicinity of the port, in the Molo sestiere, and a synagogue was built there in what is now Vico Malatti. From there the ghetto would move, in 1674, to Vico dei Tessitori in an area close to the church of Sant'Agostino and the present-day Piazza delle Erbe, of which no trace remains, however, due to the Allied bombings of World War II, and was then abolished altogether in 1752.

In the sestiere of Portoria, almost on the opposite side of Via Balbi from the city center, at the turn of the century Via Giulia was built (based on a 1628 project by patrician Giulio della Torre, hence the name of the street), which took up part of the route of the Felice street (later to become Salita San Matteo) and the Vico del Vento, and allowed to connect the area of Piazza San Matteo (where the Doria family palaces were located) with the Porta degli Archi, located within the circle of the 16th-century walls. Over the following centuries the road would be widened several times and made less steep, until it was replaced by Via XX Settembre at the end of the 19th century.

In 1652, construction began in the area of the little valley of the Carbonara stream, above the church of Our Lady of Mount Carmel, of the Albergo dei Poveri. The construction of the building was overseen, on behalf of the republic, by Emanuele Brignole (who also partly financed its construction in the following years) and Doge Oberto Della Torre. Construction had to stop almost immediately, in 1656, because of a plague, and the excavations for the foundations were used to bury the corpses of the sick. The church included in the complex, the construction of which began in April 1657, was dedicated to the Immaculate Virgin, in the hope that she would end the contagion. The first part of the building was inaugurated in 1664, but work to bring it to completion continued, with further extensions, for the next two centuries.

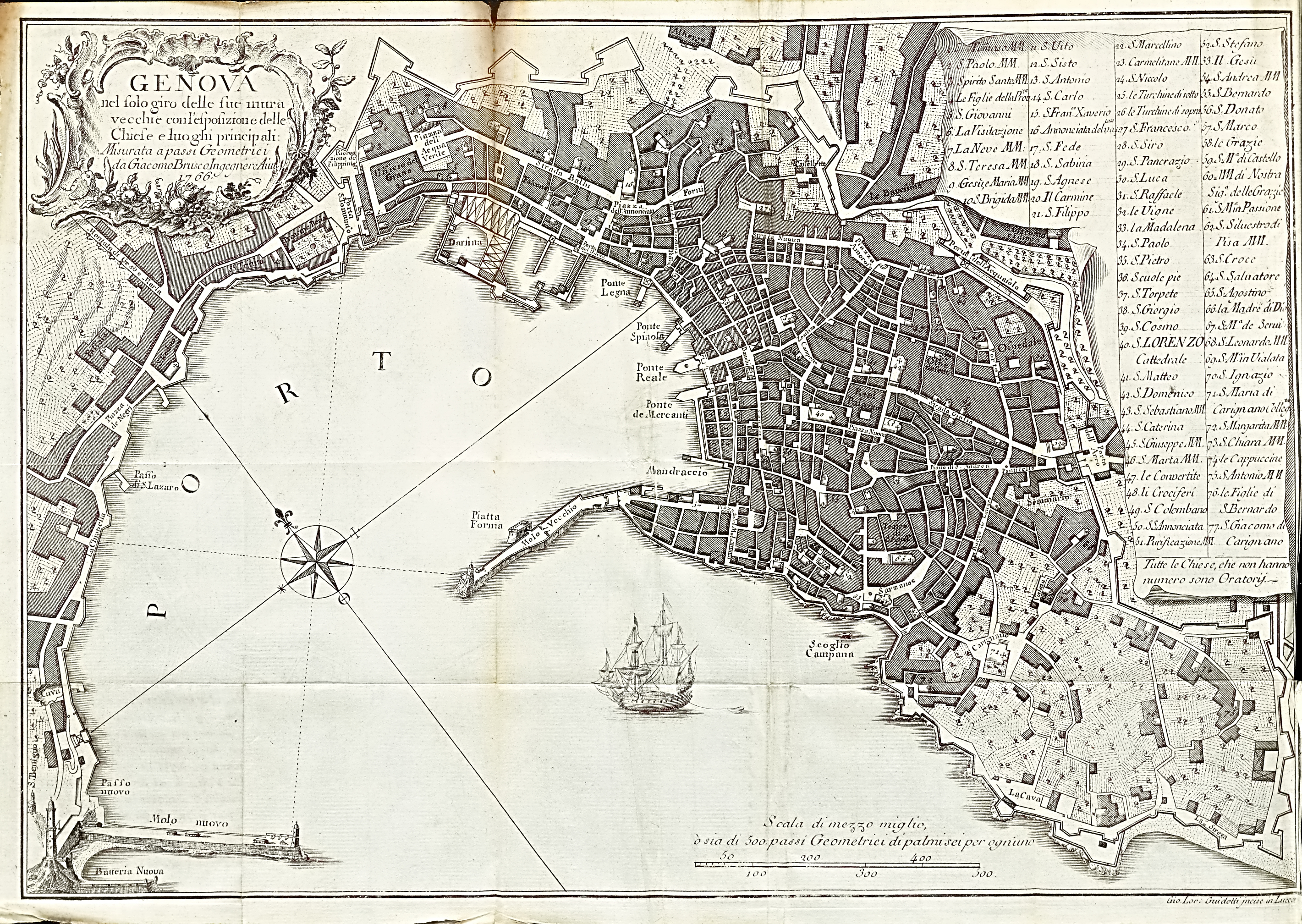
Map of Genoa in 1766, published in Description des beautés de Génes et de ses environs : ornée de differentes vuës, et de la carte topographique de la ville, from 1773.

At the end of the seventeenth century, in May 1684 to be precise, Genoa suffered a heavy bombardment by French ships, which caused a great deal of damage in the historic center (depending on the sources, from 8000 to 13000 shells reportedly fell on Genoa, destroying about 3000 buildings). Among the buildings that were destroyed and then rebuilt several decades later was also the one where, according to tradition, Christopher Columbus supposedly lived, located in the area of the Piano di Sant'Andrea. What remains of the rebuilt building (further remodeled in the following centuries) can be seen in Vico dritto di Ponticello. Initially the city resisted foreign forces and the French ships retreated once they ran out of ammunition, but the following year the Doge Francesco Maria Imperiale Lercari had to go with some senators to Versailles to offer the Republic's apologies to the Sun King: a new phase of decline began for Genoa.

The metamorphoses of the historic center, however, do not stop. Between 1718 and 1724 Domenico Sauli (a descendant of the family that decided to build the Basilica of Santa Maria Assunta) financed the construction of the Carignano bridge (named after Blessed Eugenia Ravasco), which, overhanging the area of Via Madre di Dio and Via dei Servi, united, for the first time in a direct way, the hill of Carignano with that of Sarzano. In the second half of the 18th century, the Strada Nuova was extended, with the Strada Nuovissima (today's Via Cairoli) joining the former with the area where the Basilica of the Santissima Annunziata del Vastato is located and from there to Via Balbi. As with the construction of the Strada Nuova, that of the Strada Nuovissima also involved the demolition of the previous building fabric and interrupted the various roads and crosses that connected the underlying area of the ancient burgus with Castelletto. To this period also dates the demolition of the church of Santa Brigida (on the slope of the same name), demolished to make way for three buildings known as the "Dufour palaces" after the name of the purchaser's household; before this it was used first as a blacksmith's workshop and later as a spinning mill. Also in the second half of the 18th century, the first system of public lighting was also planned, relating to some of the focal points of the streets in the city center: in 1772 an initial plan was drawn up, which called for the placement of 32 lanterns in as many places, mainly near intersections and squares, but it was not until 25 years later, in 1797, that a first functioning lighting system would be seen to be in place.

=== The contemporary era and urban expansion of the 19th century ===
With the end of the republic and the birth of the pro-revolutionary Ligurian Republic in 1797, many religious buildings (convents, churches, hospitals) were suppressed and nationalized, only to be partially returned to ecclesiastical power in the following decades.

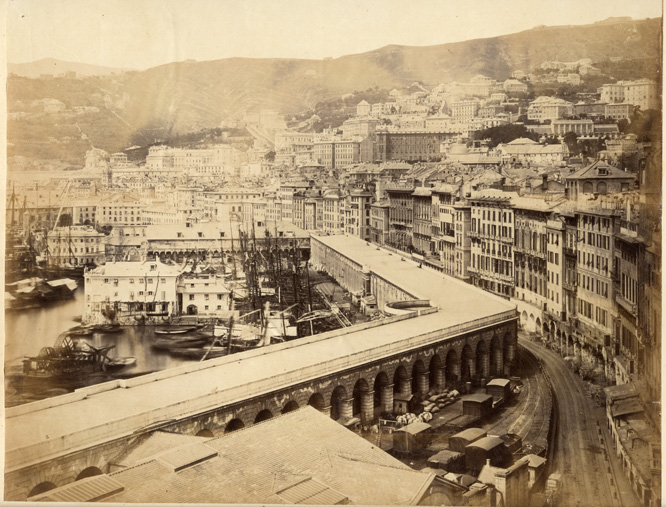
The marble terrace, in a period photograph by Alfred Noack (1833–1895).

Among those that remained in state use and no longer exist is the complex of San Domenico located in the area of today's Piazza De Ferrari (formerly called Piazza San Domenico, taking its name from it): run by the friars of the same name, who in 1431, starting from the initial church of Sant'Egidio, had expanded it, making it the largest religious building in the city and dedicating it to the saint. After the enactment of laws suppressing religious orders it was first used as a warehouse and prison and then demolished during the construction of the Carlo Felice Theater.

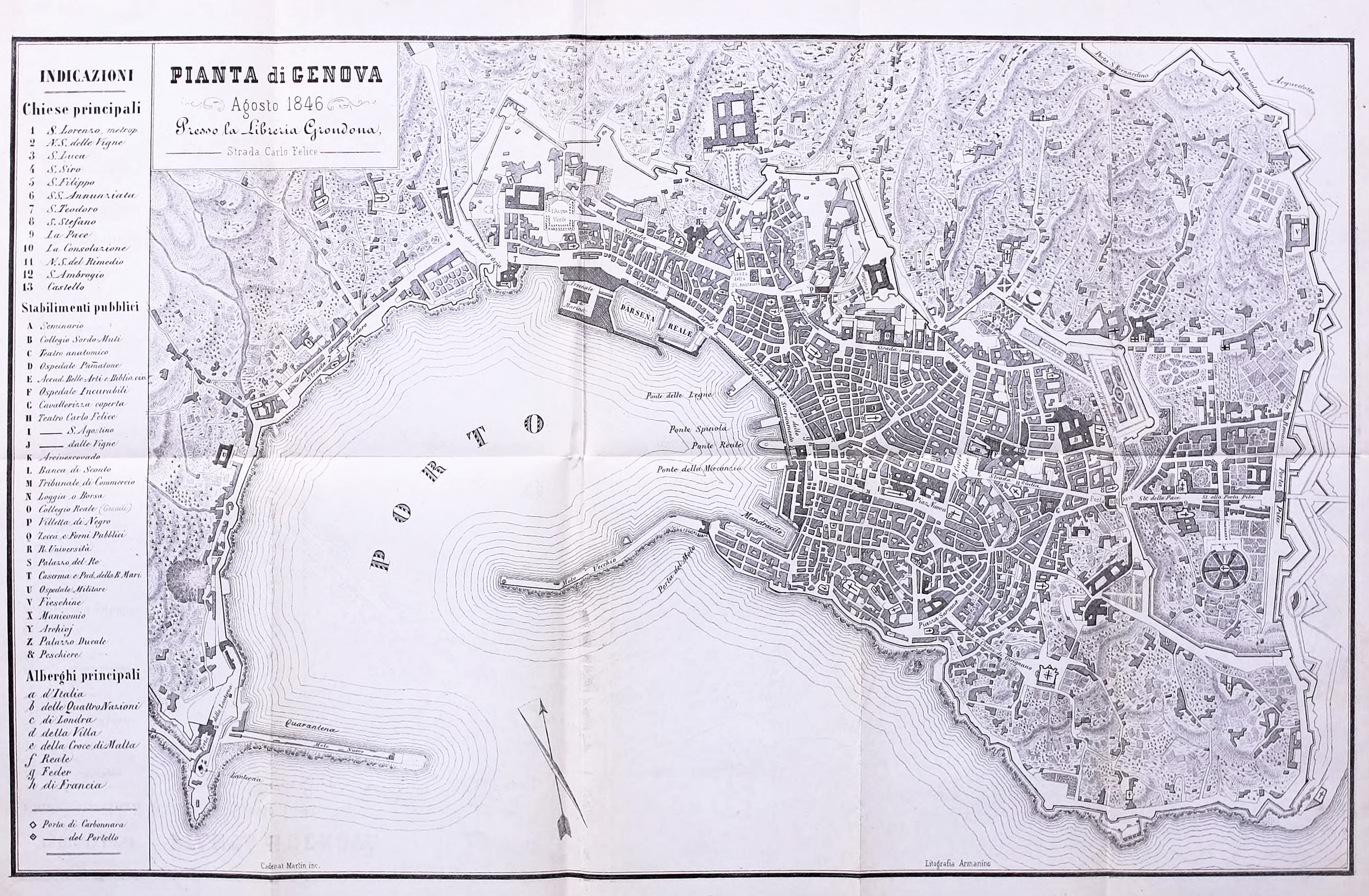
Map of Genoa from 1846, included in the guidebook Manuale del forestiere per la città di Genova published in the same year by publisher G. Grondona and printer Ferrando.

Another notable religious complex was the convent of Sant'Andrea, in the area of the same name, a Benedictine monastery that was assigned in 1798 to the Scolopi fathers, and later (1810) was deconsecrated and turned into the city jail. Its acquisition and subsequent demolition, to make way for the modernization of the area with the building of the upper part of Via XX Settembre, saw almost 30 years of bargaining (it was begun in 1876) between state and municipal institutions and the construction company, and only in 1904 was it finally torn down. The cloister of the convent, saved at the behest of architect and archaeologist Alfredo D'Andrade, was rebuilt in the area in 1922 and can be seen in the area between the Columbus house and the towers of Porta Soprana.

In 1815, with the Congress of Vienna, the Republic of Genoa was not reconstituted, and its territory became part of the Kingdom of Sardinia.

In the early 19th century Carlo Barabino presented numerous projects for the urban renewal of the city. Among his works is the central Acquasola Park (1825), in the space of the esplanade of the same name, on the land where the fourteenth- and sixteenth-century walls stood.

The areas had been used for several centuries, first as a dumping ground for the construction work on the Via Nuova (the area was in fact called i Müggi from the Genoese dialect for the piles, the heaps), then as a mass grave for the dead of the 17th-century plague. Barabino connected the park with that of the villa, belonging to Marquis Gian Carlo Di Negro, carved out on the area where the 16th-century bastion of Luccoli stood, passing through what is now Piazza Luigi Emanuele Corvetto. Part of the park would be demolished a few years later, in 1877, precisely for the creation of the area of Piazza Corvetto and Via Assarotti.

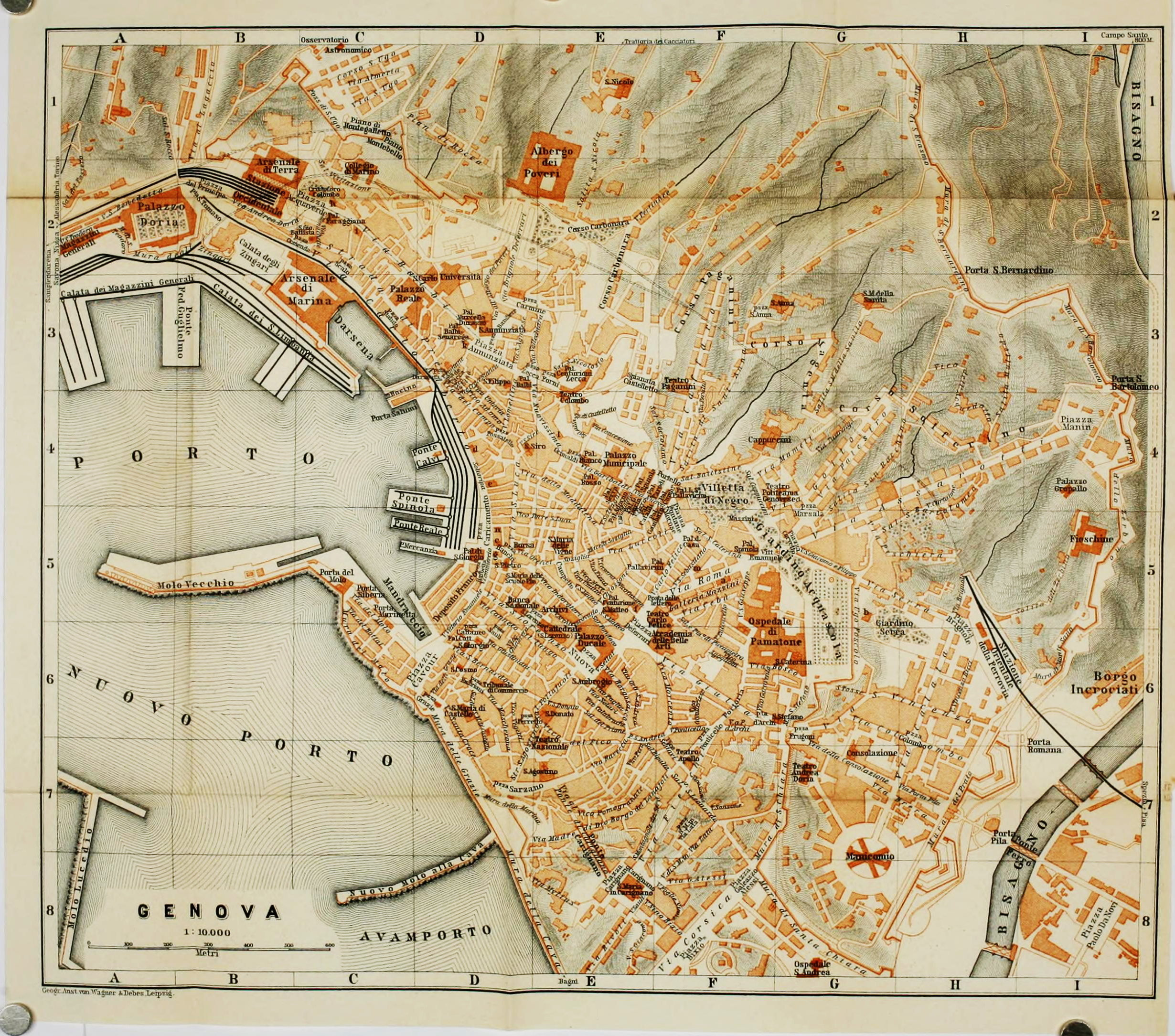
Map of Genoa in the 1880s, taken from the seventh edition of Italy, handbook for travelers, published in 1886. The main differences from the 1846 map are, in the upper part, the presence of the Principe railway station (called the western station), the presence of the streets and the first buildings that would form the ring road upstream and the neighborhoods connected to it, while in the lower right corner the first buildings of what would become the Carignano neighborhood are noted. The small marine inlet, known as Seno di Giano, immediately below the oratory of Sant'Antonio Abate, where there was the characteristic Campana rock visible in earlier maps, was no longer extant.

In 1835, after several changes of opinion on how to reshape the area and related plans proposed to the authorities, the Marble Terraces were built in the area of the old port, designed by architect Ignazio Gardella senior, a kind of promenade more than 400 meters long, which allowed to observe the port and the area behind it from an elevated position. Below the promenade the building housed several commercial premises. The terraces partly replaced the Muragliette of the 16th-century walls. Their construction, divided into two sections, lasted 12 years, but their existence was very short, as the needs of the port led to their demolition, which took place in five stages between 1883 and 1886, to make room for the tracks used to transport the goods handled in the piers. The short life of the construction had always left much uncertainty about the structure and the area actually occupied by it, but excavations carried out for the restyling of the Old Port area during the Genoa Expo '92 brought to light some of its remains and traces of the foundations, which helped confirm its actual location. A century would have to pass before new plans for the rehabilitation of the Old Port area would again hypothesize (and later realize) the presence of a promenade along the port arch. The works that led to the demolition of the terraces were part of the great revolution that affected the harbor arch between the mid-19th and early 20th centuries, including the arrival of the railroad near the old pier, the construction of canopies on the harbor bridges to shelter waiting goods from the bad weather, and the replacement of these with reinforced concrete structures after a few decades (the Magazzini del Cotone, after the Genoa Expo '92 used as a cinema and convention center, is among the latter).

In April 1849, a few days after the armistice of Vignale, the people of Genoa, partly because they had not completely abandoned their republican and independence ideas, and partly out of fear of the arrival of the Austrian army as a consequence of the armistice itself, rose up against the Savoy government, driving out the royal guard and carabinieri present in the city. General Alfonso La Marmora, sent by the newly reigning Victor Emmanuel II to quell the uprising, ordered a naval bombardment, which mainly hit the Portoria district (severely damaging the Pammatone hospital) and the port, which was followed by a bloody intervention by the bersaglieri, who indulged in destruction and gratuitous violence against the population.

At the turn of the century the Turin-Genoa railway was built, which would reach the western edge of the city with the Piazza Principe station in 1854. In the area where the initial station arose, built in a temporary building, the first permanent passenger building (by Alessandro Mazzucchetti, 1860) and its extension (by Giacomo Radini Tedeschi, 1900), there were previously the upper part of Via Balbi, a barracks (made in the former grain warehouses, dating back to the 17th century) and part of the 16th-century walls, including the San Michele bastion and the church of the same name.

In 1855, the first Italian Commodity Exchange was established in the Loggia dei Mercanti in Piazza Banchi, established through a decree by the head of the government Cavour, demonstrating the city's continued importance in the economic/mercantile field.

In the 1860s, a reorganization of the city's toponymy was also decided, by Giuseppe Banchero, an operation that led to the cataloguing of some 900 streets. The result of the work was the renaming of 32 streets and the introduction of 86 new toponyms, in some cases relating to newly established streets, in others relating to streets and roads without an official name. Part of the new names introduced referred to domains owned in past centuries by the Republic of Genoa or to battles won by its army.

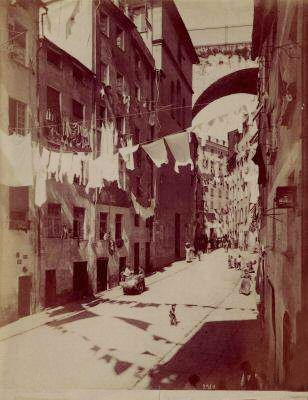
Via Madre di Dio in the late 19th century, overlooked by the Carignano Bridge, in a period photograph by Alfred Noack (1833–1895). This area is no longer extant, as many of its buildings were demolished in the 1960s to make way for the Centro dei Liguri executive complex.

Slightly more recent than the terraces is the Mazzini Gallery, built in Art Nouveau style in 1873, in the space obtained by the earthworks of part of the Piccapietra hill and the demolition of pre-existing buildings (including the convents of San Sebastiano and San Giuseppe and the oratory of the Casaccia di San Giacomo delle Fucine). Since the 1920s, the gallery has hosted the Genoa Book Fair.

In general, in the century between the first decades of the 19th and the beginning of the 20th century, what was then the city of Genoa (especially the sestieri of Portoria and San Vincenzo) underwent a major transformation, which involved the demolition of many of the old buildings, with the building of Via Assarotti (1850–1856) and Via Fieschi (1865–1870) first and Via XX Settembre (1892–1912) and Piazza Dante (1930s) later.

This expansion also led to the construction of numerous buildings in the area, overlooking the historic center, that corresponds to the Castelletto district and the construction of the two ring roads, which effectively encircle it. Among the main works of this period, in addition to those already mentioned, include the construction of Via Carlo Felice (later to become Via XXV Aprile), in 1825, the building of the theater of the same name, between 1826 and 1828, designed by Carlo Barabino (the building at that time was damaged and rendered unserviceable by the bombing of World War II, the existing one dates back to 1991), the construction of the first part of the Carlo Alberto carriageway (later to become Via Antonio Gramsci) in 1835, of Piazza and Via San Lorenzo (initially the second part of the Carlo Alberto carriageway), built over a twenty-year period starting in 1835, which also involved the dismantling and reconstruction of the facades of some old buildings in the area, of Via Vittorio Emanuele II (later to become Via Filippo Turati) with the demolition of the old medieval arcade replaced by a larger one in 19th-century style, of the palace of the Ligustian Academy of Fine Arts (built between 1826 and 1831), and finally Piazza Corvetto built at the behest of the mayor and Baron Andrea Podestà in the 1880s, where the monument dedicated to Giuseppe Mazzini (by Pietro Costa, made in 1882) and the underlying statue dedicated to Victor Emmanuel II (by Francesco Barzaghi, made in 1886) were placed.

These operations, often presented as necessary for reasons of hygiene and public utility, as well as for the modernization of the city, were not always welcomed by the population, which protested against the expropriations necessary for the works. Both the city's politicians and the press of the time made the opinions of the builders and the landowning citizens their own from time to time, livening up the political debate of the time. Alfredo D'Andrade, an architect and archaeologist, first director of the Regional Office for the Preservation of Monuments of Piedmont and Liguria and later also representative of the Ministry of Education in the negotiations concerning the sale of the prisons (former Benedictine monastery) present on the hill of Sant'Andrea, for the subsequent demolition of the same, in his communications with the central government accused the City of Genoa and the private individuals interested in the construction of being driven by speculative motives, rather than by real reasons of hygiene and public utility.

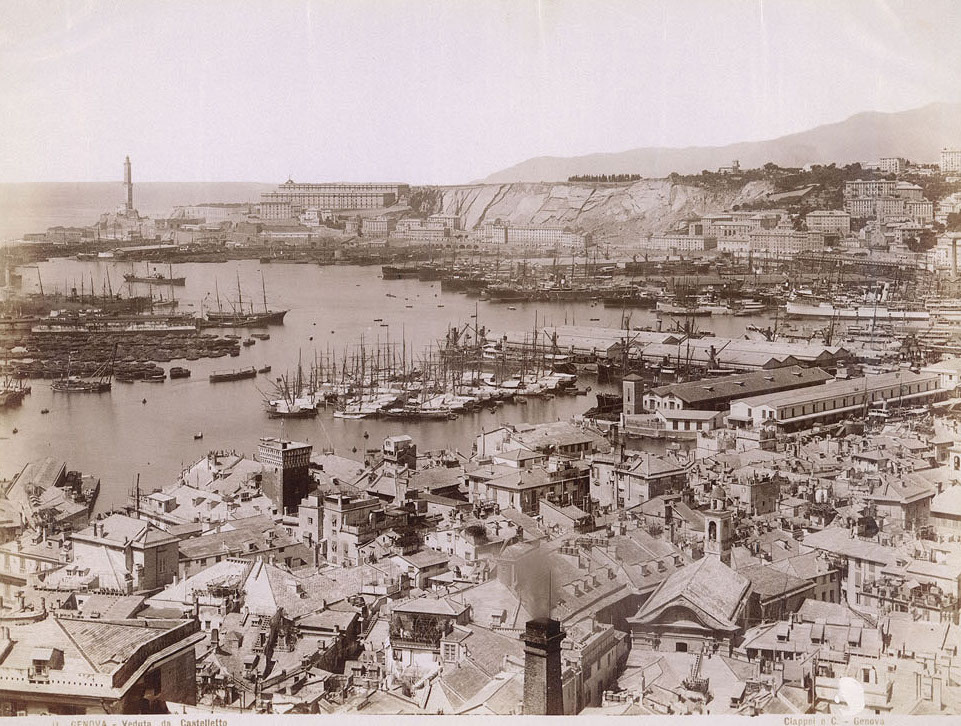
View of Genoa and its harbor in the second half of the 19th century, in a photograph by Francesco Ciappei (1857–1887)

The walls of the Fronti basse in 1889 were also partly demolished and used as a retaining wall for an embankment, destined to host in 1892 the exhibition and events for the fourth centenary of the discovery of America. Their presence, moreover, was perceived as an obstacle to the city's expansion to the east (the neighboring municipality of San Francesco d'Albaro had been annexed to Genoa, along with five others, in 1874). The same area where Via XX Settembre was built would become the new hub of city life in the 20th century, destining the other areas of the old city center to decades of progressive decay and abandonment. In fact, in the second half of the 19th century, there began to be a gradual abandonment of the old historic center by families living there (or residing along the "new streets"), who moved either to the new neighborhoods (located in the hillside areas or in the aforementioned raised areas) or to the then neighboring municipalities, while maintaining their work activities in the center; it was precisely this emigration that was to be, along with a cholera epidemic that had hit the city, one of the causes of the decline in the municipality's resident population between the first general census of 1861 and the next one in 1871. The abandonment by the households traditionally residing in the area, especially those with belonging to the upper-middle classes, would continue in the following decades, causing the progressive deterioration of the condition of many buildings, left for years without regular maintenance, and transforming large parts of the historic center into residential areas intended for the poorest segments of the population, such as the elderly or immigrant families from southern Italy in search of work.

As mentioned initially, it was during this period of major constructions, both public and private, whose works began to unearth the remains of the oldest city and destroy part of the medieval one, that historians began, albeit amid many difficulties and several missteps, to make the first attempts at non-legendary reconstructions of Genoa's origin and the location of its first settlements.

=== From the 20th century to the present ===
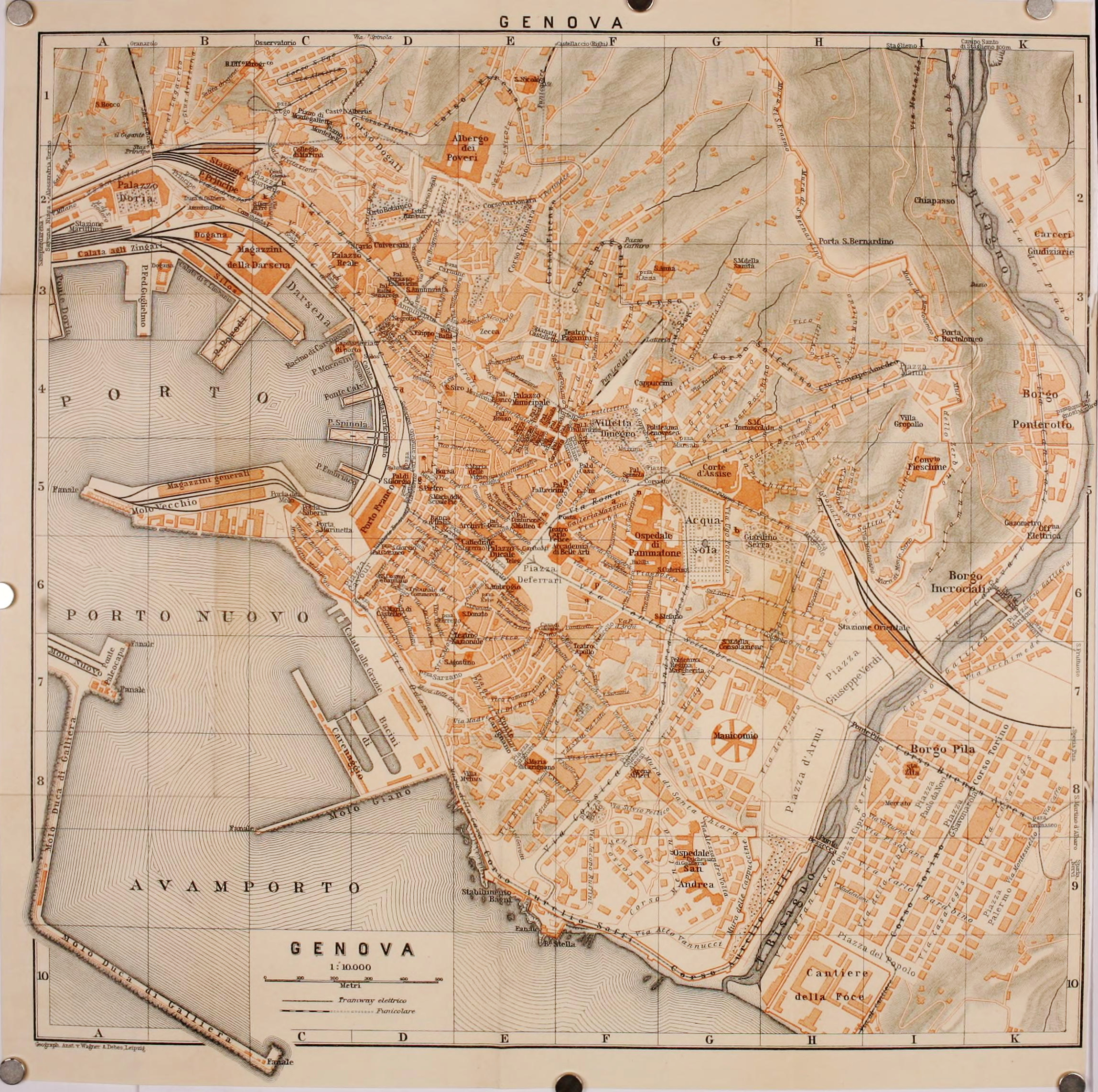
Map of Genoa in the early 20th century, taken from the thirteenth edition of Italy, handbook for travelers, published in 1906. Compared with the 1886 map, one notices the presence of Via XX Settembre instead of Via Giulia, the transformation of the walls and part of the Bisagno riverbed into the place-of-arms (where Piazza della Vittoria would later be built) and Piazza Verdi, the demolition of the buildings placed on the Piano di Sant'Andrea, and the fills for the expansion of the port behind the old pier and at the base of the Grazie walls. The Brignole railway station, called Stazione Orientale, is also larger and closer to the Bisagno riverbed than the first station built there (in 1868).

Via del Campo, there’s a whore
with great big leaf-colored eyes.
If the desire to love her comes to you,
it’s enough to just take her by the hand.

— Fabrizio De André, Via del Campo

In 1907 a Department of Fine Arts, the first of its kind in Italy, was established by the municipality, initially headed by historian and archaeologist Gaetano Poggi, former mayor of Arquata Scrivia between 1890 and 1895 and a member of an earlier commission that was to assess which Genoese buildings and monuments should be subject to special protection because of their historical value. The new council and the Superintendence of Fine Arts, in the following years, would initiate a series of restorations aimed at bringing back to view the characteristic medieval structures of the walls of some of the buildings in the historic center that had been modified, covered, and re-plastered during the Renaissance, with the aim of enhancing the older aspects of the buildings in the area.

The construction of Via XX Settembre and the surrounding areas would end in the 1910s, but this would be only the first of many building interventions that would affect the historic center during that century. In the space obtained from the demolition and silting up of the Fronti Basse on the Bisagno during the 1892 Italian-American Exposition, a space that in the following years had hosted numerous events (including the 1914 Hygiene, Marine and Colonial Exposition), between the 1920s and the 1930s Piazza della Vittoria was built to a design by Marcello Piacentini, with its Arco della Vittoria (inaugurated in 1931). Also based on Piacentini's design, the Grattacielo dell'Orologio (Clock Skyscraper) was built in Piazza Dante, inaugurated in 1940, which, with its 108 m distributed over 31 floors, was for a long time the tallest building in the city (surpassed by the Matitone of San Benigno in 1992, by only one meter, but with fewer floors).

In 1926, by Royal Decree-Law No. 74 of 14 January 1926 and subsequent Royal Decree-Law No. 662 of 15 April 1926, Great Genoa was created, uniting 19 other previously independent municipalities with the then municipality of Genoa.

In 1932 a new master plan, created after a competition of ideas, and called the Master Plan of the central areas of the city, particularly ambitious, provided for several revolutions in the road structure and in the city building style, with the demolition of part of the historic center, deemed necessary for the opening of new roads and the construction of some tunnels. Modified in the following years, only part of the projects envisaged therein would actually see the light of day, but its approach would continue to influence urban planning decisions pertaining to the historic center until the 1970s. In May 1937, the architect and engineer Piero Barbieri published a study in the journal Genova titled Master Plan and Thinning of Medieval Genoa, in which he analyzed the situation of the old city from both a demographic point of view (with also its repercussions related to public health issues) and a transportation point of view (also publishing his own research on the distribution of various pedestrian flows along the main routes), as well as of enhancement of buildings of artistic and historical interest, to be implemented mostly through the gutting of adjacent buildings to create squares that could make them more visible and noticeable. According to Barbieri:

Again, according to the theoretical rules, in order to achieve the desired balance from the hygienic point of view, it would be necessary to: demolish as many houses for a total area of 130,000 m² of the 258,000 currently covered; increase the area available for courtyards, private and public gardens from the current 25,000 m² to as much as 128,000 m²: slightly modify the number of streets, increasing them from 113,000 sq. m. to 140,000 sq. m., but above all reform their structure and distribution, which is now broken up into a multitude of alleys and blind alleys that are inappropriate from any point of view.

— Piero Barbieri, Piano regolatore e di diradamento della Genova medioevale, published in Genoa, May 1937

After the armistice of Cassibile and with the establishment of the Italian Social Republic, part of the town's toponymy, including the center, would change, with the disappearance of the names dedicated to the Savoy family: some of these changes would be kept even after the end of the war (for example, the Vittorio Emanuele III gallery named after Giuseppe Garibaldi), while in some cases the names would be further changed (for example, Via Carlo Felice, which first became Via della Repubblica and after the war Via 25 Aprile).

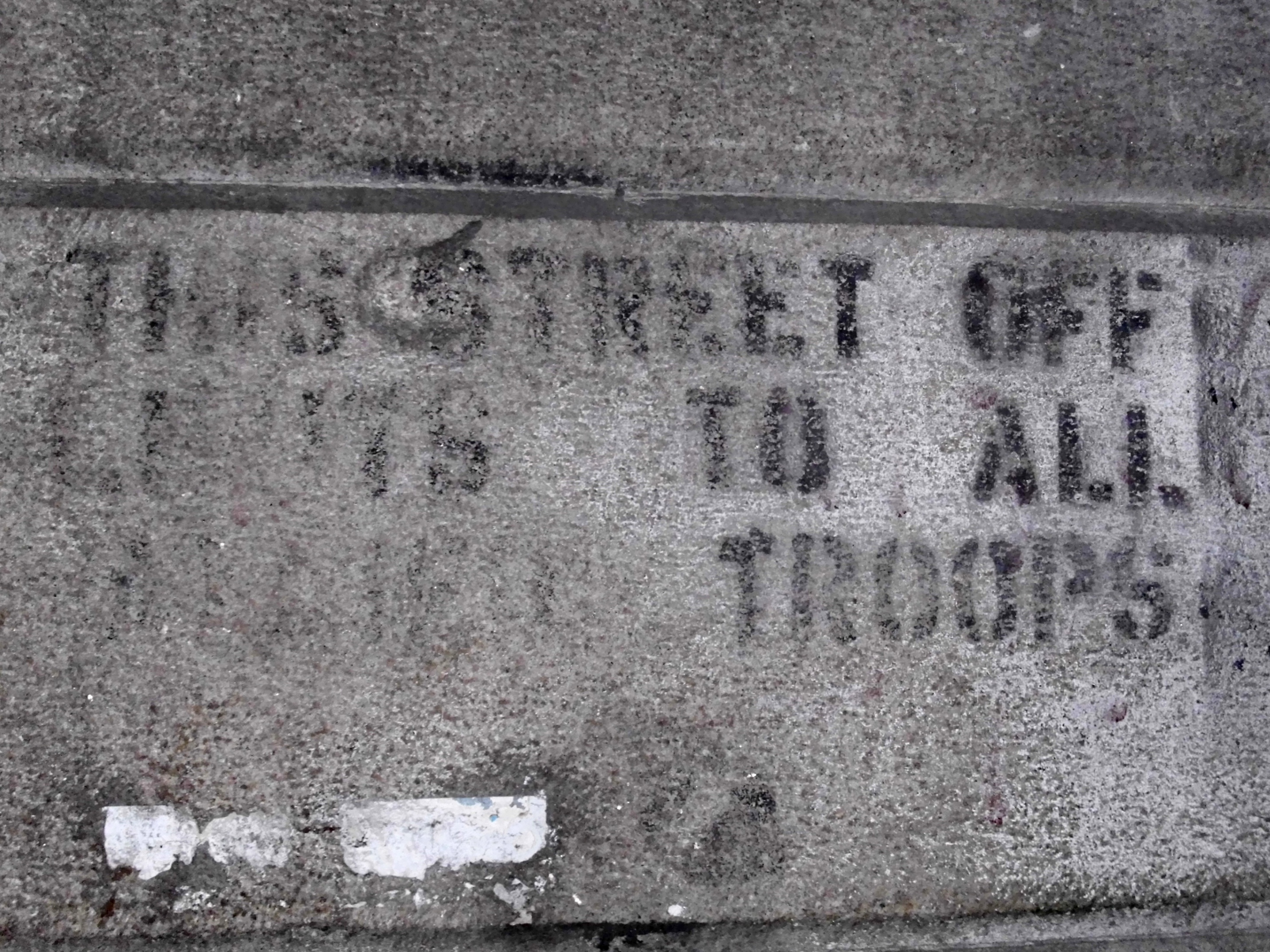
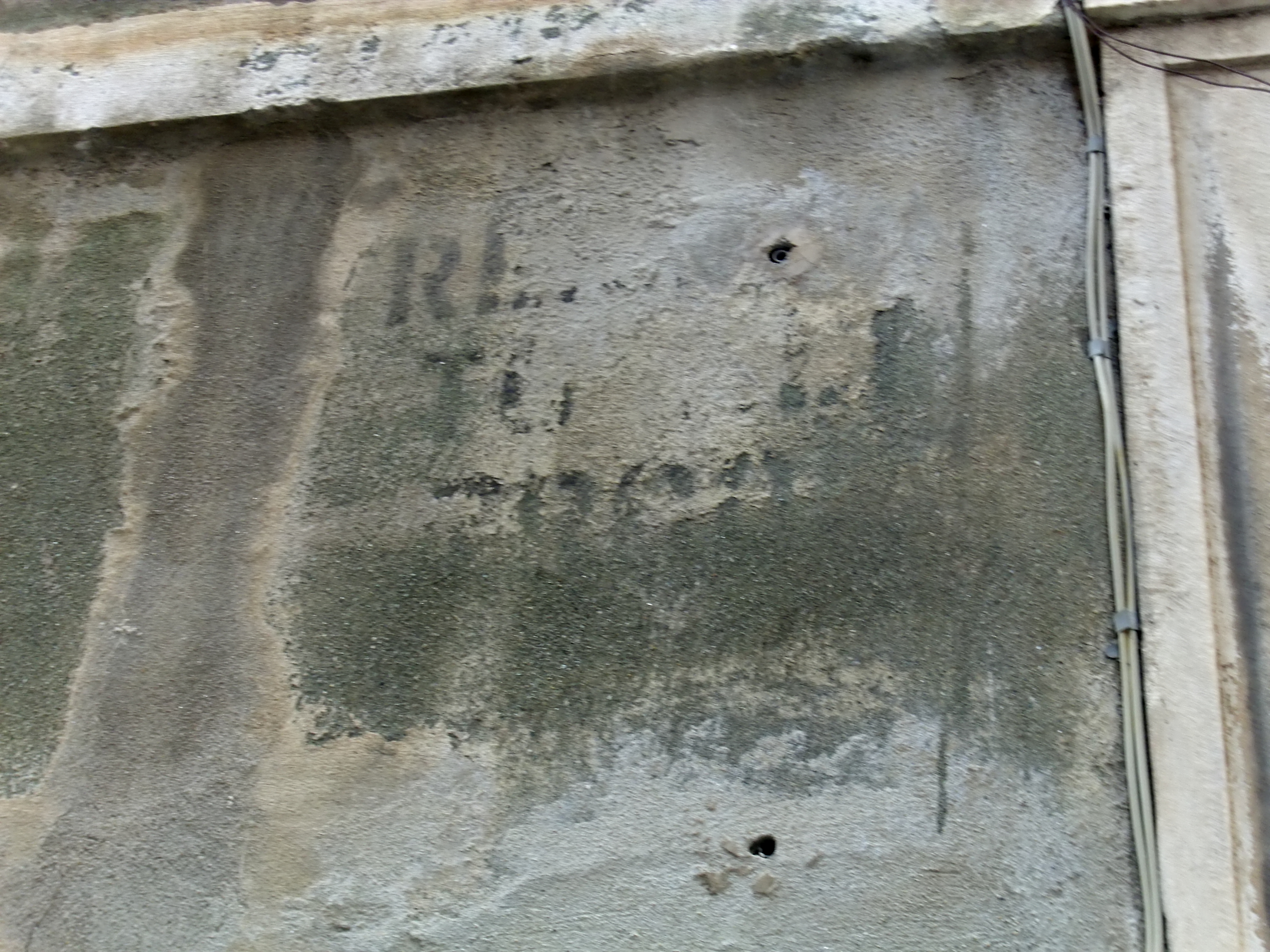
"This street off limits to all allied troops" is the text, partly obliterated, of notices placed on the edge of the historic center in the immediate postwar period. The left inscription was on one of the columns of the porticoes of the 19th-century Via Filippo Turati, the right one, almost completely lost, on the wall of a building between Via Garibaldi and Via ai quattro Canti di San Francesco. During summer 2022 the inscriptions in the Sottoripa arcade were almost all erased, probably by mistake during some cleaning operations carried out by volunteers.

Partially damaged by Allied bombing in World War II and only partially rebuilt in the immediate postwar period, the historic center was for several decades one of the most degraded areas of Genoa, immortalized as such by songs, books, and films. In the months following the end of the conflict, the very entrance to the area was discouraged to Allied soldiers present in the city, complete with warning signs in English placed at the entrances to the alleys in Sottoripa (some still visible, though partly erased), precisely because of the dangers that the underworld and widespread prostitution could pose to those who ventured, without knowing it, into the maze of alleys and rubble. The area of the Sarzano convent, one of the most heavily damaged by the bombings, became in the immediate postwar period a refuge for homeless people and immigrants, a situation well depicted in the Oscar-winning film The Walls of Malapaga (1949). In the following decades, a number of building interventions led to the demolition of several parts of the historic center, while new buildings sprang up on the rubble of the bombed palaces, which stand out not only for their modern style but also for their greater height compared to the surrounding buildings.

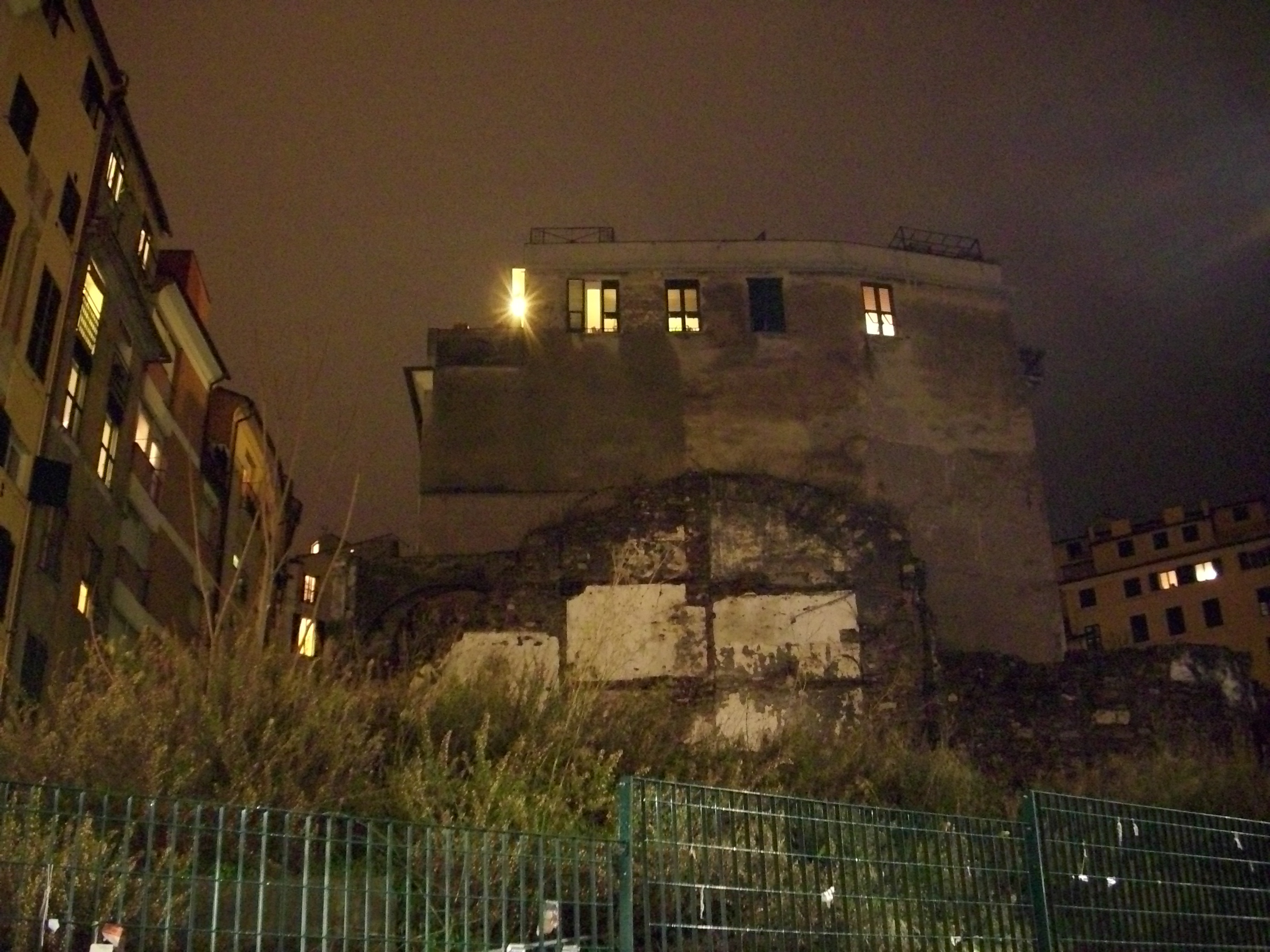
Some ruins in Piazza delle Erbe, in the area where the oratory of Santa Maria del Suffragio once stood, among the few signs of World War 2 bombing to be present at the beginning of the 21st century (photo from December 2008). In 2010, a modern-style school building was built on the site, designed by architects Jörg Friedrich and Roberto Melai.

At the end of the 1960s, the area on Madre di Dio Street (where, in Passo Gattamora, there was Niccolò Paganini's house) was demolished to allow the construction of the Centro dei Liguri executive complex. This is one of the last urbanistic changes (if not the last in absolute terms, certainly the last in importance) provided for in the 1932 master plan to actually be implemented. The Centro dei Liguri complex, built between 1972 and 1980, is behind the clock tower, adjacent to Via Fieschi, and spans the two sides of the eighteenth-century Carigniano Bridge. The area, home to the Region of Liguria and several companies, although frequented during daytime working hours, degraded over time, a deterioration probably also facilitated by a suboptimal integration with the neighboring urban context, so much so that the small children's playground present, officially Giardini Baltimora, is commonly called Giardini di Plastica (Plastic Gardens). Also in the same decade, the construction of the causeway involved the demolition of some of the buildings present along the road that bordered the port, in the area of Via Gramsci, Piazza Caricamento and Piazza Cavour.

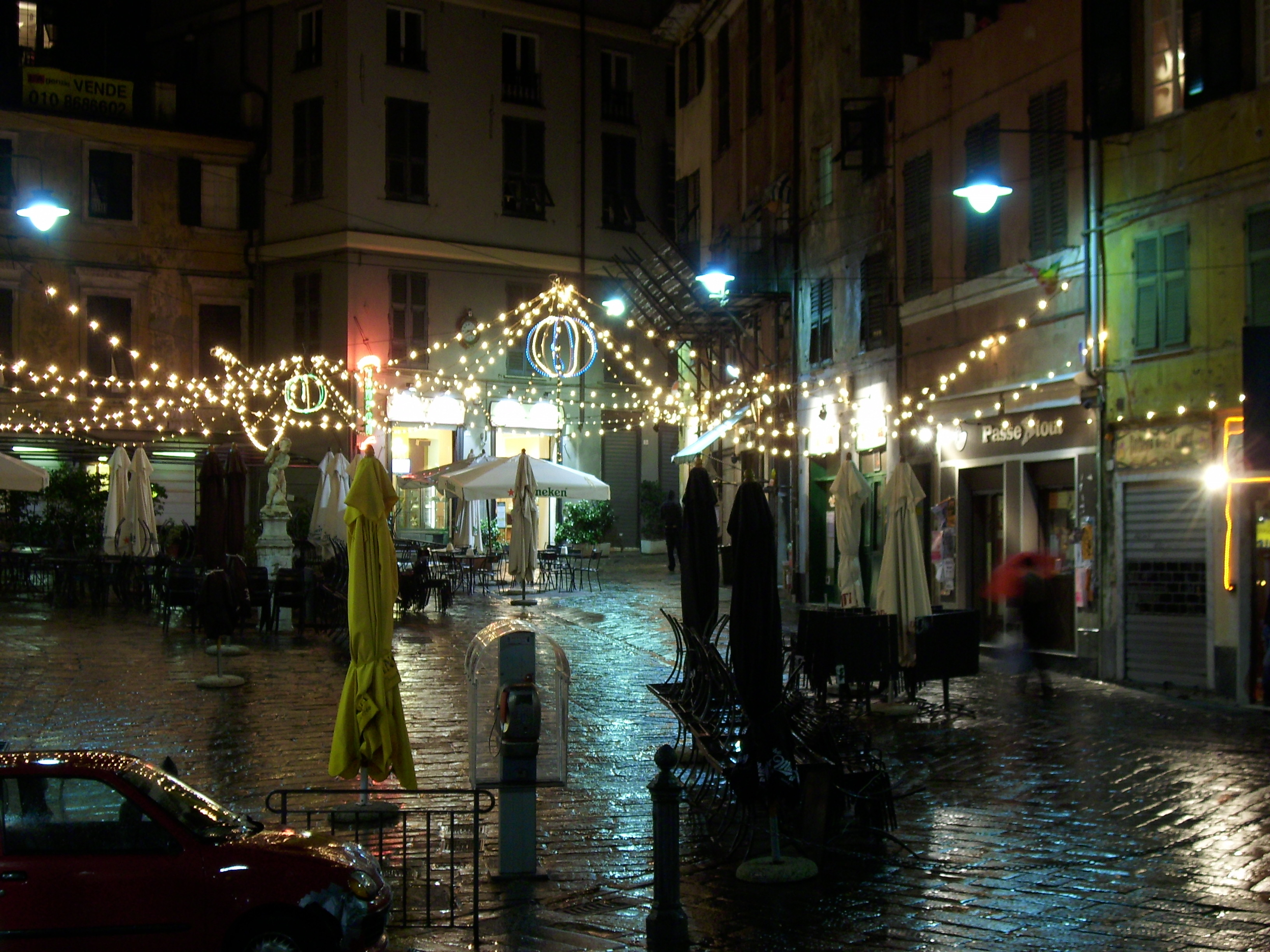
Piazza delle Erbe, which has become one of the centers of Genoese nightlife in recent years. After excavations in the 1990s, it was assumed that an amphitheater stood in the area in the first two centuries AD, which was later abandoned, to be replaced by the use of the land for agricultural purposes, which in turn was followed by swamping. After the construction of the nearby church of San Donato in the 12th century and church of Santa Tecla in the 13th century, part of this area of the city was again used for residential and commercial purposes, but it was not until the 16th century that intensive building of the area began. In the square, which owes its name to the open-air fruit and vegetable market there in the past, there is a marble fountain, with a putto at its top, made in 1697 by Domenico Parodi.

The elevated road, a debated work whose possible demolition is speculated several times, running along the port arch of the city center, allows a view of part of the historic center from a panoramic position. Architect Renzo Piano suggested in 2007, in order to take advantage of this scenic route in the event of its demolition, to replace it with an overhead monorail.

In 1976 a new master plan was approved by the municipality, which, among other things, aimed to attempt to rehabilitate the area. From the 1980s onward, partly due to funding related to events such as the 1990 FIFA World Cup, Genoa Expo '92, the 2001 Genoa G8, and Genoa European Capital of Culture in 2004, a renaissance began, leading part of the old city to be one of the most popular tourist spots in Genoa. The subway itself has 5 of its 7 stations located in the old town area. During the various works carried out for the aforementioned events, traces of the old piers and ancient buildings have been found, but these, while bringing new information about the city's past, have almost always been covered over after being studied by the archaeologists of the superintendence and are therefore no longer visible.

In the different itineraries that unravel from Piazza De Ferrari, the heart of the center, in an urbanistically unconventional nucleus, the result of multiple modifications and renovations over the centuries, it is possible to identify the three main guiding lines that trace, with the help of the fortresses and walls built in different centuries between the Middle Ages, the Renaissance and the 19th century, the contours of an architecturally "oblique city" rich in unique and valuable elements.

These directions correspond, for the oldest part, to Via San Lorenzo, which descends, crossing numerous streets, alleys (the caruggi) and lateral creuze, from the Piano di Sant'Andrea and Piazza De Ferrari to the Marina and the old port. The term has been traced to the Latin quadrivium, meaning a crossroads. Many of the lanes retain names associated with the trades and workshops historically located there, including streets named for goldsmiths and gilders.

The pedestrianization of the square and the partial pedestrianization of the street, which took place in the early 21st century, make it the ideal pedestrian route for tourist flows between the port and the executive area. For the 16th–17th-century part in Via XXV Aprile, which, with the transit of Piazza delle Fontane Marose and Via Garibaldi (the ancient Strada Nuova), leads to Piazza dell'Annunziata and the university district of Via Balbi (home of the Royal Palace). Finally, for the strictly medieval part, in the dense fabric of caruggi that from Piazza Campetto and the Macelli di Soziglia leads to the Church of Santa Maria delle Vigne and the Pre-Molo-Maddalena district.

After the revitalization of the area that occurred with the Genoa Expo '92, the fulcrum around which many of the flows of commerce and tourism currently revolve is provided by the area of the old port (an area redesigned by Renzo Piano), where the aquarium is located, with the back of Piazza Caricamento and the Sottoripa (or Ripa) arcades. From there, around the Bank of Saint George at which the city of merchants and dockers of the Compagnia dei caravana was being created, one can easily reach Via Orefici and Piazza Banchi, skirting the old Loggia della Mercanzia, site of the old Commodity Exchange, a building used for numerous events and exhibitions until 2021 and now home to an archaeological site.

As for the eastern part of the historic center, after years of semi-abandonment, the relocation of the faculty of architecture to Stradone Sant'Agostino/Via Mascherona (which connects Sarzano/Castello with the caruggi sites between Piazza delle Erbe and Via San Lorenzo) with the rehabilitation of the area of the San Silvestro convent (destroyed by bombing) and the opening of numerous restaurants and clubs from the 1990s onward, have led to a rebirth of the area and to an active and busy evening and nightlife, the so-called Genoese "movida," which is, however, often a source of friction with part of the residents, who on several occasions have demanded and obtained from the public administration restrictive measures on the opening hours of clubs. Since 2006, the area has been reached by public transportation, via the Sarzano/Sant'Agostino subway station.

Confirming the recovery of the historic center in recent decades, or at least a substantial part of it, UNESCO declared part of the historic center a World Heritage Site on 13 July 2006.

== Landmarks and places of interest ==
The alleys that develop particularly in the part adjacent to the old port, constitute a kind of intricate casbah architecturally characterized in a way that is not always unified and easily identifiable, with Romanesque-style churches, palaces of classical and neoclassical style and buildings belonging to the Middle Eastern culture, the result of the past that brought the Genoese to operate in the main ports of the Mediterranean Sea and on the fields of the Crusades.

=== World Heritage Site ===
Patrimonio dell'Umanità dell'UNESCO

A large part of it, enclosed in the section of the so-called Strade Nuove (Via Garibaldi, Via Cairoli and Via Balbi), where the Rolli palaces stand, was declared a UNESCO World Heritage Site on 13 July 2006.

With the term Rolli (derived from the word scrolls), or more precisely Rolli of the public lodgings of Genoa, from 1576 onwards the lists of palaces that were excellent residences of the noble families who aspired to host, on the basis of a public draw, high personalities in transit for state visits, were indicated. Forty-two of these buildings were included in the World Heritage List.

The Rolli were divided into bussoli, in which the buildings (about one hundred and fifty residences, not all of which still exist) were classified into three types of categories according to their prestige: the first was drawn up in 1576 and the next in 1588, 1599, 1614 and 1664.

On 20 January 2007, a plaque was placed by UNESCO at the beginning of Via Garibaldi with the motivation listing the series of Palazzi dei Rolli among the World Heritage Sites:

The major mansions, varied in form and distribution, were drawn in official lists (rolli) to host state visits. The palaces, often erected on sloping ground, divided into a sequence of atrium – courtyard – staircase – garden and rich in interior decoration, express a singular social and economic identity that inaugurated modern-age urban architecture in Europe.

=== Religious architecture ===
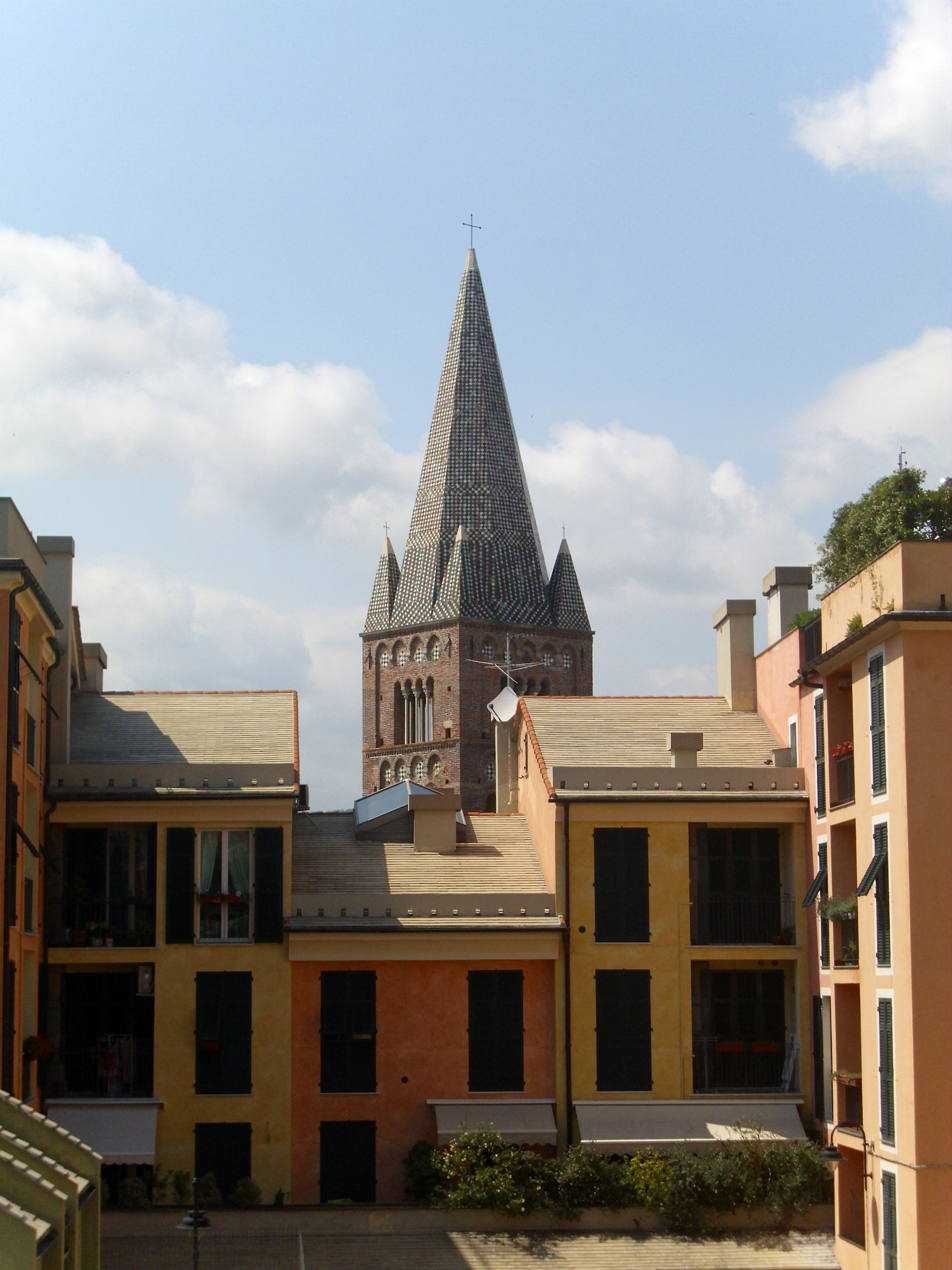
The bell tower of the Church of St. Augustine, photographed from Passo delle Murette. The cusp and four spires of the bell tower, similar in shape, and coeval in period of construction, to those of the Commenda of San Giovanni di Pré, are the only ones in Genoa to be covered with polychrome tiles, in the Moorish style of alicados.

Genoa's historic center is home to the largest and among the best-known churches and buildings of worship in the city. Of the very earliest churches that denoted the presence of Christian groups in the city virtually nothing remains, having been destroyed from time to time, incorporated into newer churches or heavily renovated over the centuries to the point of making the original scheme unrecognizable. The oldest churches visible today date from roughly the beginning of the late medieval period.

Symbols of Genoese religious power, but also of the noblest families who in most cases contributed to the establishment of many places of worship in the form of aristocratic chapels, the churches of the historic center are part of the history of Genoa and, from an architectural and touristic point of view, are a rallying point and attraction for the tourist-religious activity of the Ligurian capital.

As written earlier, with the establishment of the pro-Napoleonic Ligurian Republic following the Treaty of Campo Formio in 1797, many religious buildings were expropriated. After the annexation of the Republic to the Kingdom of Sardinia, decided during the Congress of Vienna, some of these buildings remained state-owned while others were reassigned to the Catholic Church, but not always to the same religious orders that previously resided there. Major construction works, which took place in the city center from the early 19th century onward, then led to the demolition of several churches and monasteries, of which there are no visible traces left.

As for the formerly existing Islamic places of worship in the dock area, these were abandoned and used for other purposes at the end of the 18th century, when, in the wake of the ideals of the French Revolution, the newly formed Ligurian Republic abolished slavery, freeing the Muslim prisoners there. Only a few remnants remain, incorporated into the building that houses the Faculty of Economics.

The Jewish community had several places of worship, both in the older city (as shown by the aforementioned letters of Theodoric from the early 6th century), and after the arrival of Sephardic Jews from Spain in the “ghetto” district, and later in the Pier district, which no longer exist. In 1935 the present synagogue was built, located in a side street of Via Assarotti (a steep slope that connects the Portoria neighborhood with the Castelletto neighborhood, in the area outside the historical center proper), which replaced the Molo one.

From west to east, within the historic center area can be identified:

Building	Coordinates	Historical notes
Church and Commenda of San Giovanni di Prè	44°24′57″N 8°55′21″E	Located on Prè Street, it is the best-known and best-preserved Genoese Romanesque-style building in the historic center. Founded in 1180 by the Knights Hospitaller, the body of the building consists of two overlapping churches and the Commenda.
Church of St. Sixtus	44°24′50″N 8°55′33″E	Located on the seaward side of the southwestern section of the Prè district, it is the 19th-century (1827) neoclassical rebuilding of a pre-existing Romanesque structure dating from the 11th century.
St. Anthony's Abbey	44°24′49″N 8°55′34″E	Demolished in 1881, it was located in lower Vico di Sant'Antonio; a portal dated 1365 remains visible of the earlier building.
Church of San Marco al Molo	44°24′26.3″N 8°55′35″E	Located in the Molo district, the church was erected in the second half of the 12th century. Between the end of the 16th century and the first decades of the 18th it underwent several expansions and alterations that gave it a Baroque style. On the left side of the church is walled a plaque with bas-relief, depicting the lion of St. Mark, which was taken from the city of Pula in 1380, when the Genoese sacked it.
Church of Santa Fede	44°24′48″N 8°55′38″E	Located in Metelino Square, the existing building is a 17th-century reconstruction of an existing 11th-century Romanesque temple. The former Romanesque church is, since 2007, the seat of the Municipio I Centro Est. From the church's name the nearby Porta dei Vacca was also called Porta di Santa Fede.
Church of San Marcellino	44°24′42.8″N 8°55′41.5″E	Already known in 1023 and an aristocratic church of the Cybo family, it is an 18th-century reconstruction. Giovanni Battista Cybo, who ascended to the papal throne in 1484 as Pope Innocent VIII, was baptized here.
Sanctuary of Nostra Signora delle Grazie al Molo	44°24′20.7″N 8°55′41.5″E	Located in Piazza delle Grazie, it is the rebuilding of an earlier church carried out in the 17th century. The original Romanesque-style bell tower and a crypt dating back to the 11th century are present.
Basilica of the Santissima Annunziata del Vastato	44°24′51″N 8°55′42″E	Built in several stages, between the early 16th and mid-17th centuries, in an area formerly occupied by a community of Humiliati Friars, who had built a church there in the 13th century dedicated to Santa Marta del Prato.
Oratory of San Giacomo della Marina	44°24′19″N 8°55′43″E	Erected in the 16th century on the walls of the city of Genoa, in an area that was touched by the sea until the end of the 19th century. It was restored in the second half of the 20th century.
Church of Saints Cosmas and Damian	44°24′23.4″N 8°55′43.7″E	Also called di San Cosimo, its foundation is dated 1049.
Church of Our Lady of Mount Carmel and St. Agnes	44°24′54″N 8°55′45″E	Located in the Carmine district of the same name, it was erected in the 13th century by Carmelite monks who came in the retinue of Louis IX of France, and enlarged several times in the following centuries. It underwent restoration work in the 1930s and early 21st century.
Church of San Torpete	44°24′25.9″N 8°55′44.4″E	A noble church of the Cattaneo family, it was rebuilt after 1730. The entrance to the church is located in Piazza San Giorgio, adjacent to the entrance to the church of San Giorgio.
Church of St. George	44°24′26″N 8°55′45″E	Mentioned in 904, it is a 17th-century reconstruction. The entrance to the church is located in St. George's Square, adjacent to that of the church of St. Torpete.
Church of San Pancrazio	44°24′41.4″N 8°55′44.8″E	A noble church of the Pallavicini family, it was rebuilt, in the square of the same name, after the French naval bombardment of 1684.
Church of Santa Maria di Castello	44°24′20″N 8°55′45″E	Built in the first quarter of the 12th century.
Church of San Pietro in Banchi	44°24′32.4″N 8°55′47.5″E	Built between 1572 and 1585 in the square of the same name on the remains of the church of San Pietro della Porta, an ancient church owned by the abbey of San Colombano of Bobbio, erected in the 9th century and destroyed by fire in 1398.
Church of Santa Maria delle Grazie la Nuova	44°24′19.4″N 8°55′48.4″E	With the attached convent of the Lateran canonesses, it dates from the 16th century. It is home to the Center for Paganinian Studies.
Basilica of San Siro	44°24′42″N 8°55′48″E	Rebuilt in its present form in 1585, until the 9th century, although located in the burgus outside the walls, it had been the cathedral of Genoa, only to be replaced by the more central and protected San Lorenzo.
Church of San Luca	44°24′37.4″N 8°55′48.7″E	Existing since the end of the 12th century, it was the aristocratic parish of the Spinola and Grimaldi families. It was rebuilt between 1626 and 1650.
Church of the Holy Name of Mary and Guardian Angels	44°24′30.6″N 8°55′50.2″E	Built by the Scolopian Fathers at the turn of the mid-18th century on the area occupied by a pre-existing building.
Oratory of Saints Peter and Paul	44°24′22.7″N 8°55′50.9″E	Built in 1772, in the early 20th century it was requisitioned and used from 1918 as a paper depot by the newspaper Il Secolo XIX; it is home to some associations.
Cathedral of St. Lawrence	44°24′28″N 8°55′52″E	Located in the square of the street of the same name its construction began in the 12th century for a final phase in the 14th century. Inside is preserved the Museum of the Treasure of the Cathedral of St. Lawrence.
Church of San Donato	44°24′20.5″N 8°55′53.8″E	Built in the early 12th century.
Church of San Salvatore	44°24′14.4″N 8°55′53.8″E	Located in Sarzano Square, the former church was founded in 1141 but completely rebuilt in 1653. Restored, especially after considerable damage suffered in the bombing of World War II, it houses the lecture hall of the Faculty of Architecture of the University of Genoa.
Oratory of St. Anthony Abbot	44°24′13.7″N 8°55′54.2″E	Overlooking the sea and home to a historic “casaccia,” it was reopened for religious worship in 1816 and restored in 1828.
Church of St. Augustine	44°24′17″N 8°55′56″E	Founded by the Augustinians in 1260 in Gothic style, since 1995 it has been converted into an auditorium with a capacity of 750 seats.
Church of St. Matthew	44°24′29.7″N 8°55′59.2″E	Founded in 1125 as an aristocratic chapel of the Doria family, the current Gothic style dates back to the 1278 revival.
Church of Jesus and Saints Ambrose and Andrew	44°24′24″N 8°56′0″E	Located in Matteotti Square near the Doge's Palace, today's church is a reconstruction from 1589. The facade was completely redone in the second half of the 19th century.
Church of Santa Maria Maddalena	44°24′36.7″N 8°55′58.8″E	Fifteenth-seventeenth-century reconstruction of a pre-existing medieval building.
Basilica of Santa Maria Assunta	44°24′7.2″N 8°56′6″E	Established as the aristocratic church of the Sauli family, it is one of Galeazzo Alessi's best-known Genoese works. Its construction began in 1552 and continued until the beginning of the 1600s, but the church was modified several times in the following centuries.
Church of the Holy Cross and St. Camillus de Lellis	44°24′29.3″N 8°56′14.9″E	Built in the 17th century next to the no longer existing Pammatone Hospital to house the congregation of Camillian Fathers who worked there, it survived the Allied bombings that destroyed the hospital and almost all other surrounding buildings
Church of the Santissima Annunziata di Portoria	44°24′28″N 8°56′21″E	Located near the Acquasola esplanade and also closely connected with the activity of the Pammatone hospital, it was built with the adjoining convent, starting in 1488 by the Friars Minor, but later it was alternated with Capuchins. Jesuits, Camillians, the “reformed priests of Tortona” and Augustinians. World War II bombings destroyed the convent, but fortunately spared the church. While retaining the dedication to the Holy Annunciation, the church since 1927 has been officially declared the “Sanctuary of St. Catherine,” and the body of the saint is preserved inside.

=== The votive shrines and portals ===
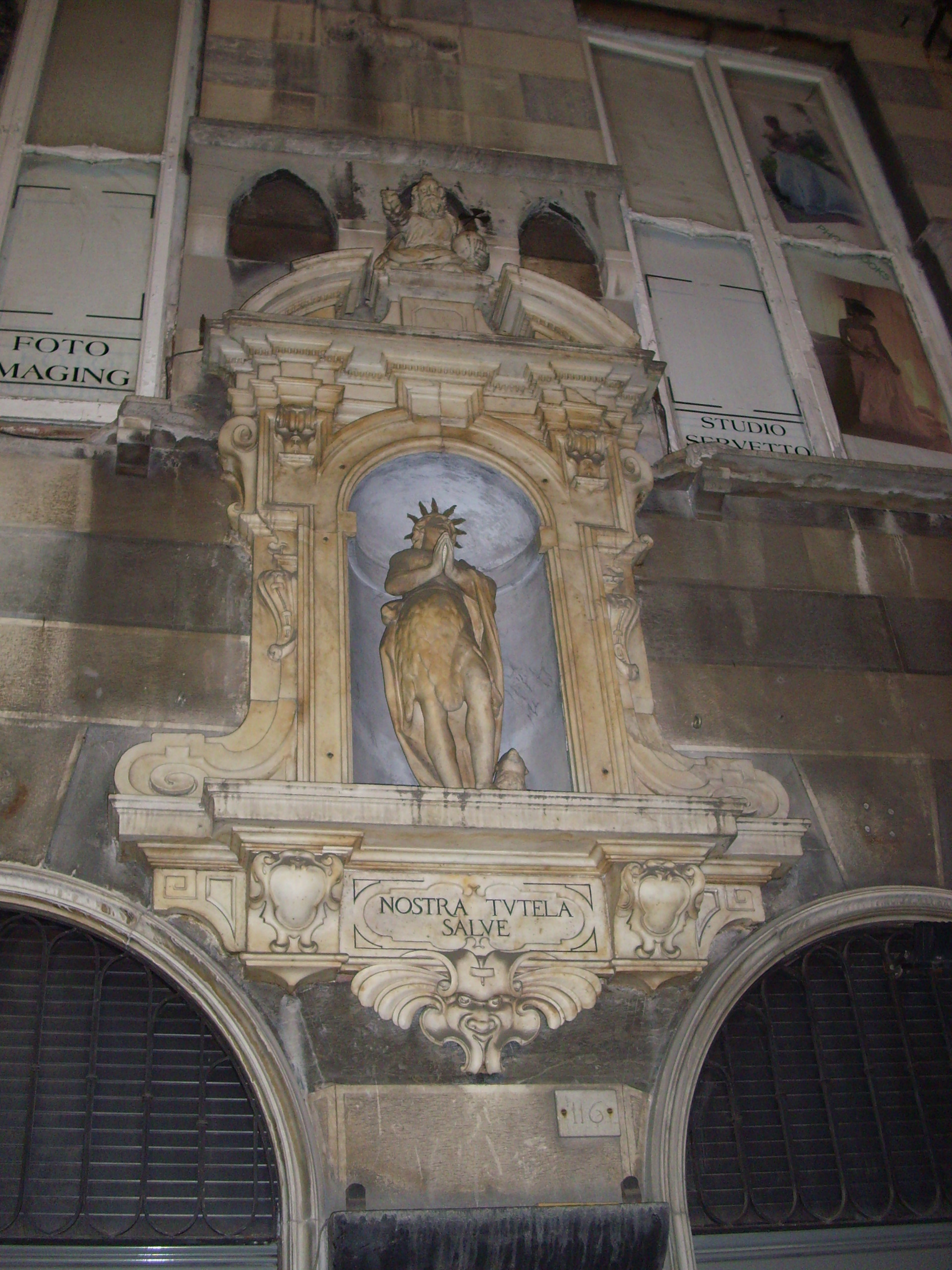
St. John the Baptist in Soziglia Square, aedicule dating from the 17th/18th centuries and restored in 1991.

There are plenty of Saints' and Virgin's Shrines, of course; generally at the corners of streets.

— Charles Dickens speaking of Genoa, "Pictures from Italy", 1846

One of the typical features of Genoa's historic center is the large number of votive shrines present, not all of which are in a good state of preservation or easily visible, although a challenging restoration and cataloguing project has been underway in recent decades. The tradition originated in the late Middle Ages and continued for several centuries until the early 20th century, peaking in the 16th and 17th centuries.

Hundreds of aedicules (not all of which exist today) are believed to have been built in the historic center over time, many of them dedicated to Our Lady (particularly venerated in Genoa, so much so that in 1637 she was declared the “Queen of Genoa”), whether by nobles, merchants and artisans, confraternities or ordinary citizens. The depictions present were then often adorned with votive offerings and candles.

Another feature are the portals of palaces, finely decorated with sculptures, statues (in marble, slate and stone) and frescoes. The origin of the spread of this type of portals is to be found in the 15th century, when the noble families who owned the palaces in the area, in order to cope with the shortage of space for new living areas or to be used as stores, decided to reuse the courtyards and porticos of the same, changing the distribution of space and obtaining new rooms and loggias overlapping them.

The redefined palaces thus needed new entrances, more sumptuous than the previous ones, the design and construction of which were entrusted to sculptors and master masons, often from outside the city (many of whom came to Genoa because they were interested in the marble and other raw materials that were landed in the port), mainly from Lombardy (from the Intelvi Valley) or Tuscany. The themes depicted, besides religious ones, often took up Greek mythology or were tributes to the family that owned the palace.

In the decades-long deterioration that accompanied the downtown area, many of the statues contained in the aedicules and many of the decorations on the portals deteriorated severely or were subject to theft and vandalism.

== Genoa's growth and population trends in the old city ==
Genoa's population at the beginning of the 16th century is estimated at between 50,000 and 100,000, depending on different estimates (the most recent ones being less), included almost entirely in the sestieri of Molo, Maddalena, Prè and Portoria.

An 1834 text, Viaggio nella Liguria marittima (Journey in Maritime Liguria), written by Davide Bertolotti, gives a table in which he summarizes data dating from about 1530, collected by “il Giustiniano” (Agostino Giustiniani, bishop of Nebbio, author of the Castigatissimi Annali di Genova), and based on these he tries to obtain an estimate of the population in the first decades of the 16th century. According to Giustiniani's data reported and summed up by Bertolotti, there were 6298 houses in Genoa in the circle included within the sixteenth-century walls, to which must be added more than 300 houses in the area that would be incorporated into the seventeenth-century Mura Nuove. The humblest houses, believed to be the majority, would have had 4, 5 or 6 fuochi (i.e., family units, normally of 5 or 6 people): this leads the nineteenth-century writer to estimate (considering a default estimate of four fuochi per house and 5 individuals per fuoco) the population of Genoa (wall circle plus surroundings) to be about 132,000, a figure higher than the values generally considered correct for that period by present-day historians.

Estimates and studies based on various documents (annals, documents of the Bishopric and the Republic of Genoa, etc.) reported by the publications of the Municipality's Statistical Organizational Unit, suggest a population of nearly 50,000 in the second half of the 16th century, which would grow until of the plague of 1656, reaching about 90,000 residents, only to collapse because of it to about 40,000. The expansion of the city in the meantime would also incorporate into it the sestieri of San Vincenzo (to the east) and San Teodoro (to the west).

From the mid-sixteenth century onward, after the plague, the population would increase again, reaching about 100,000 in the 1830s, to exceed 130,000 one forty years later. The aforementioned Dizionario geografico storico statistico commerciale degli Stati di S.M. il Re di Sardegna by Goffredo Casalis, reporting data for 1938, estimated the city's population, military (both garrison soldiers and naval personnel) and port personnel included, at 115,257. The author also specifies that there were 181 Jews who “not being able to own any real estate, engaged in maritime trade with good success,” and had a synagogue in the area of the Malapaga walls (Molo sestiere); in addition to these, the author reports, there were also several Protestants, 296 Swiss and 65 Anglicans, and these groups "were mostly engaged in commerce, and figured among the bankers, and the richest shopkeepers" and had a church in the area of the Crosa del Diavolo (present-day Largo San Giuseppe, in the vicinity of Galleria Mazzini and Piazza Corvetto). Casalis also specifies that Genoa usually had an average number of outsiders estimated at about 2,800, to which were added the inhabitants of nearby areas who came to the city during daylight hours for business or work.

As far as the period between the 18th and 19th centuries is concerned, in 1797, by Napoleon Bonaparte, the Republic of Genoa ended its existence and with it the de facto independence of the city. The subsequent Ligurian Republic was closely dependent on the French, alongside whom it fought several wars that led to its besieging by the Austrians and British in 1800, a siege that caused nearly 10,000 deaths due to malnutrition and disease. The Ligurian Republic itself would be annexed to the French Empire in 1805, and with the fall of the French Empire in 1814, after a few months as the Genoese Republic, it would then be annexed to the Savoy Kingdom of Sardinia.

The population census of 1861 reported the existence of 5409 houses, 185 of which were empty, a number of households amounting to 28931, with a population within the course of the walls of 139,993 (de facto population, i.e., present on the census date 31 December 1861, of 127,986 inhabitants, to which must be added 12,007 absentees), of whom, however, only 127,735 actually resided (de jure population) in Genoa. In the census a decade later, in 1871, the de facto population rises to 130,269, while the de jure population falls to 125,606. The bureau analyzing the data from the 1871 census justified this decline by changes in the unstable population, by the cholera epidemic that had hit the city between 1866 and 1867, and by the fact that many citizens had moved to the more livable and inexpensive neighboring towns.

In 1874 Genoa grew out of its initial 6 sestieri and annexed, in its expansion to the east and along the Bisagno valley, precisely these municipalities: Marassi, San Francesco and San Martino d'Albaro, San Fruttuoso, and Staglieno, as well as that of the Foce (a name referring to the presence of the estuary of the Bisagno stream).

After the unification of the Kingdom of Italy, the population in the historic areas of downtown Genoa had the following trend, noted in the various censuses over the years:

Sestiere	1861	1871	1881	1901	1911	1921	1931	1936	1951	1961	1971	1981	1991	2001
Maddalena	11891	12341	11484	12511	11402	11805	10666	11431	11629	10130	7437	6485	5598	4924
Molo	22717	22837	21929	24430	24474	25112	23635	24668	22947	19164	13763	11437	9043	7667
Portoria	35877	38774	39912	40260	39251	38373	34667	35007	25967	20021	14236	11311	9398	9012
Prè	20895	18497	17303	17261	17770	18251	17290	18676	17233	13871	9905	9013	7352	6862
San Teodoro	10427	11368	14539	21779	26316	33892	37439	37889	39533	53595	62630	59841	51955	45294
San Vincenzo	21963	27019	30146	39654	46634	51830	53439	57988	60134	56915	52343	46412	39947	36387
Inner harbor area	4216	–	549	44	709	419	1518	–	1361	760	310	301	147	215
Total	127986	130836	135862	155939	166556	179682	178654	185659	178804	174456	160624	144800	123440	110361
Prè-Molo-Maddalena	55503	53675	50716	54202	53646	55168	51591	54775	51809	43165	31105	26935	21993	19453

As also pointed out in the Demographic Atlas published by the municipality, the ancient area of the historic center, corresponding to the Prè-Molo-Maddalena sestieri, shows a singular demographic evolution with respect to the rest of Genoa: albeit with some fluctuations between one census and the next one, the population appears to have slightly decreased between the first one in 1861 and the one almost a century later in 1951, to then have its own and true collapse between the 1961 and 1971 census (−12. 060 residents), during the period when instead the city as a whole reached its population peak (816,872 residents at the 1971 census), and then continued to decline (this time consistently with the rest of the city) in the censuses of the following decades. At the 2001 census, the population in the Prè-Molo-Maddalena area, with its 19,453 residents, corresponds to about 3.19 percent of the total city population (610,307 residents), while considering all the sestieri it comes to about 18.08 percent. However, for several decades there has been a substantial presence of irregular immigrants in the area, which, in fact, makes the actual population higher than recorded by statistics.

Regarding the origin (place of birth) of official residents, gender and average age, the data provided by the municipality of Genoa for 31 December 2007, are as follows:

Urban unit	City of Genoa		Other municipalities in the province		Other municipalities in the region		Northern Italy		Central Italy		Southern Italy and Islands		Overseas		Total
Urban unit	Residents	%	Residents	%	Residents	%	Residents	%	Residents	%	Residents	%	Residents	%	
Prè	3384	43,2	150	1,9	191	2,4	546	7,0	194	2,5	885	11,3	2477	31,6	7827
Maddalena	3039	52,5	133	2,3	184	3,2	502	8,7	155	2,7	824	14,2	951	16,4	5788
Molo	5218	55,4	218	2,3	286	3,0	703	7,5	233	2,5	1281	13,6	1475	15,7	9414
San Vincenzo	3456	64,0	170	3,1	145	2,7	630	11,7	176	3,3	440	8,1	382	7,1	5399
Carignano	5312	64,1	250	3,0	236	2,8	786	9,5	310	3,7	690	8,3	709	8,5	8293
San Teodoro	6946	65,0	255	2,4	201	1,9	854	8,0	343	3,2	1546	14,5	538	5,0	10683

Urban unit	Average age	Males	Females
Prè	42,0	4380	3447
Maddalena	42,6	2922	2866
Molo	43,9	4785	4629
San Vincenzo	49,2	2460	2939
Carignano	46,4	3954	4339
San Teodoro	47,8	5034	5649

== Image gallery ==
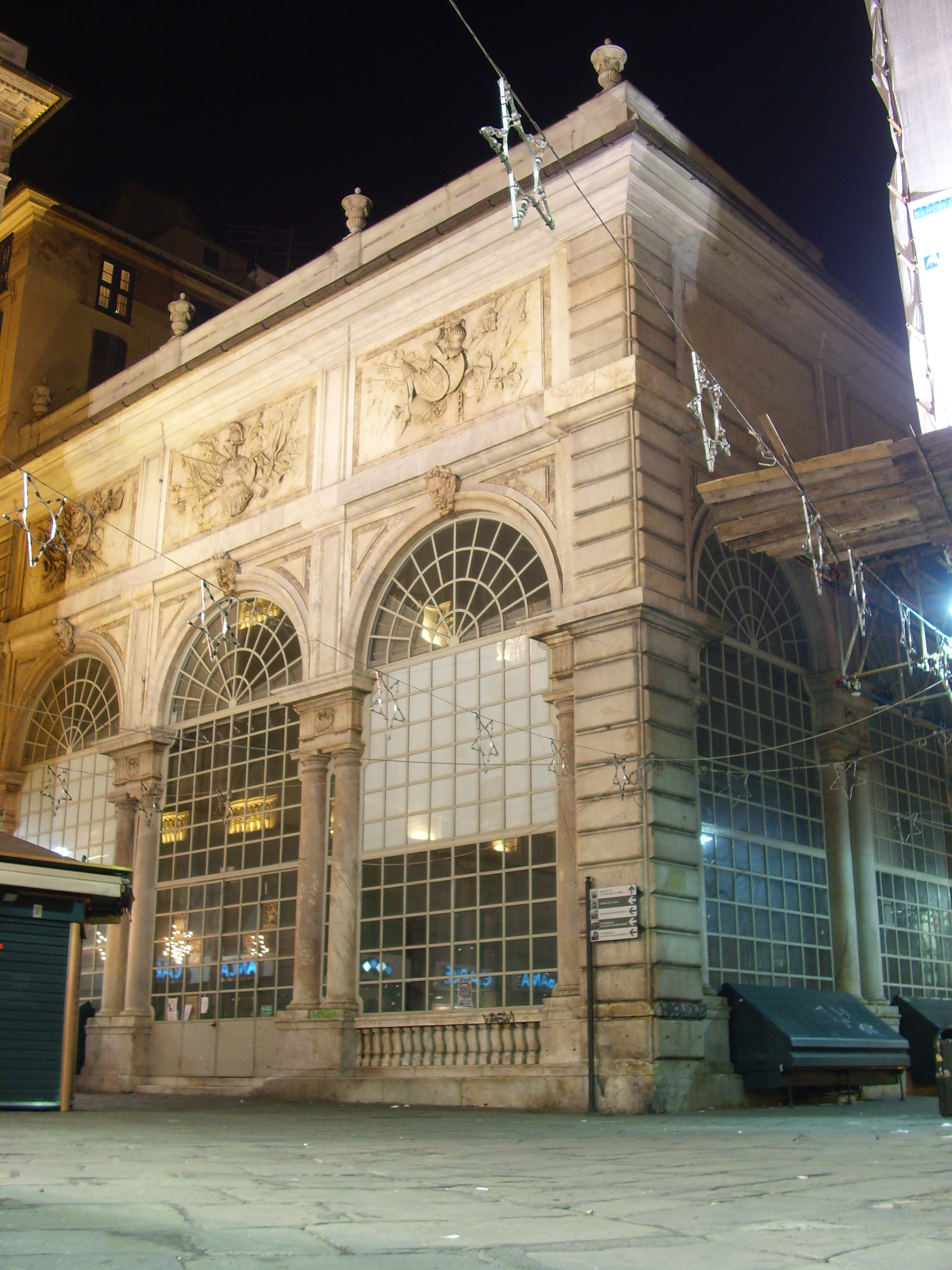
The Loggia della Mercanzia in Piazza Banchi, in the Molo sestiere, was erected between 1589 and 1595 by Andrea Ceresola (known as il Vannone) and Giovanni Ponzello. From 1855 it housed the first Italian commodities exchange. In 1942 its roof was destroyed by fire, caused by Allied bombing, but it was renovated and reopened to the public in 1950; it is home to exhibitions and events.

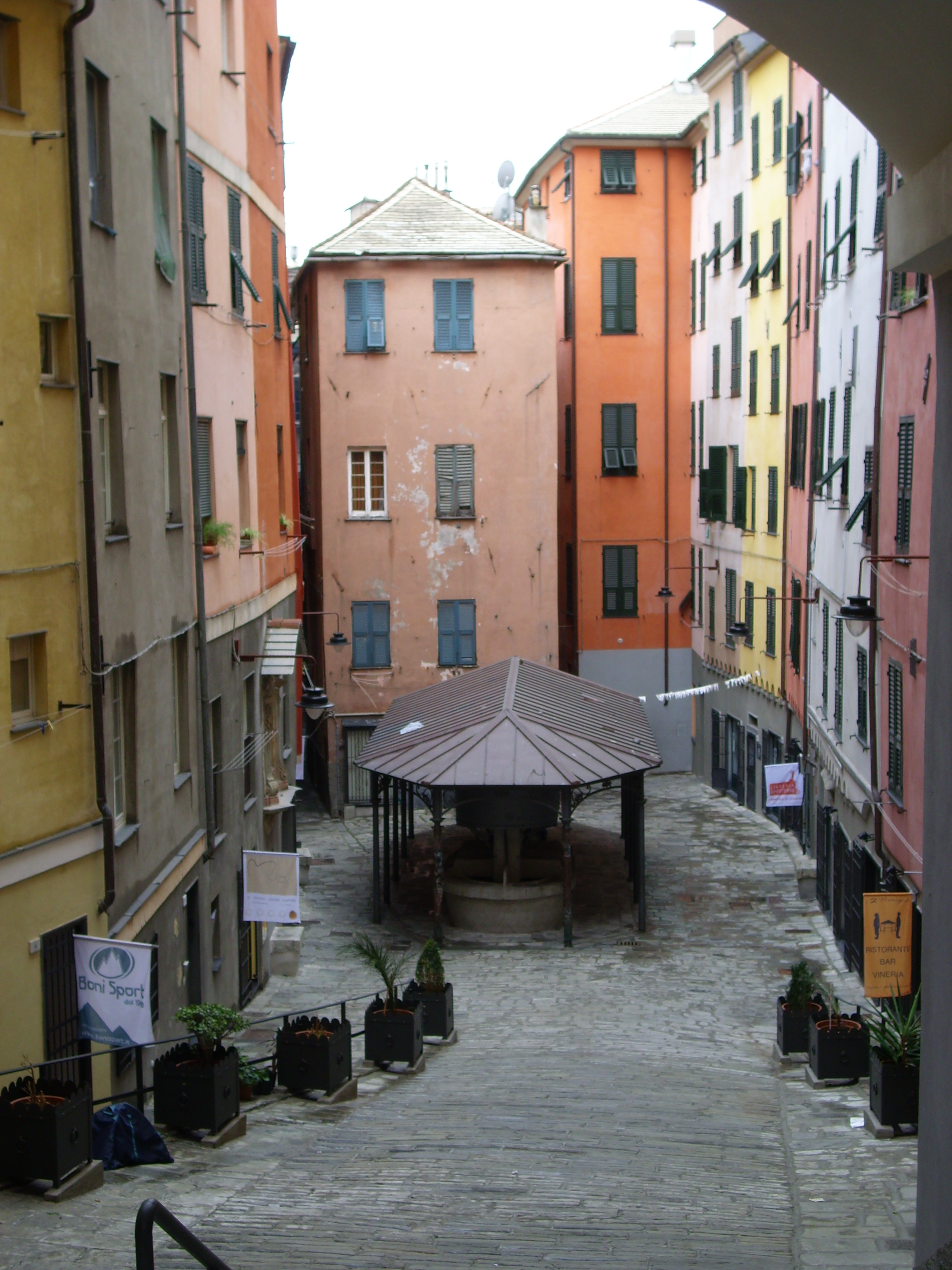
The troughs of Santa Brigida (photographed from Via Balbi): they were built in 1656, during the plague that hit the city hard, with contributions from the Balbi family. The area, like much of the historic center, which was neglected during the second half of the 20th century, has been accessible again since 2006, after heavy restorations led to its almost complete closure for about 20 years. The square, with its characteristic appearance, is one of the recurring locations in films shot in Genoa in the second half of the 20th century.

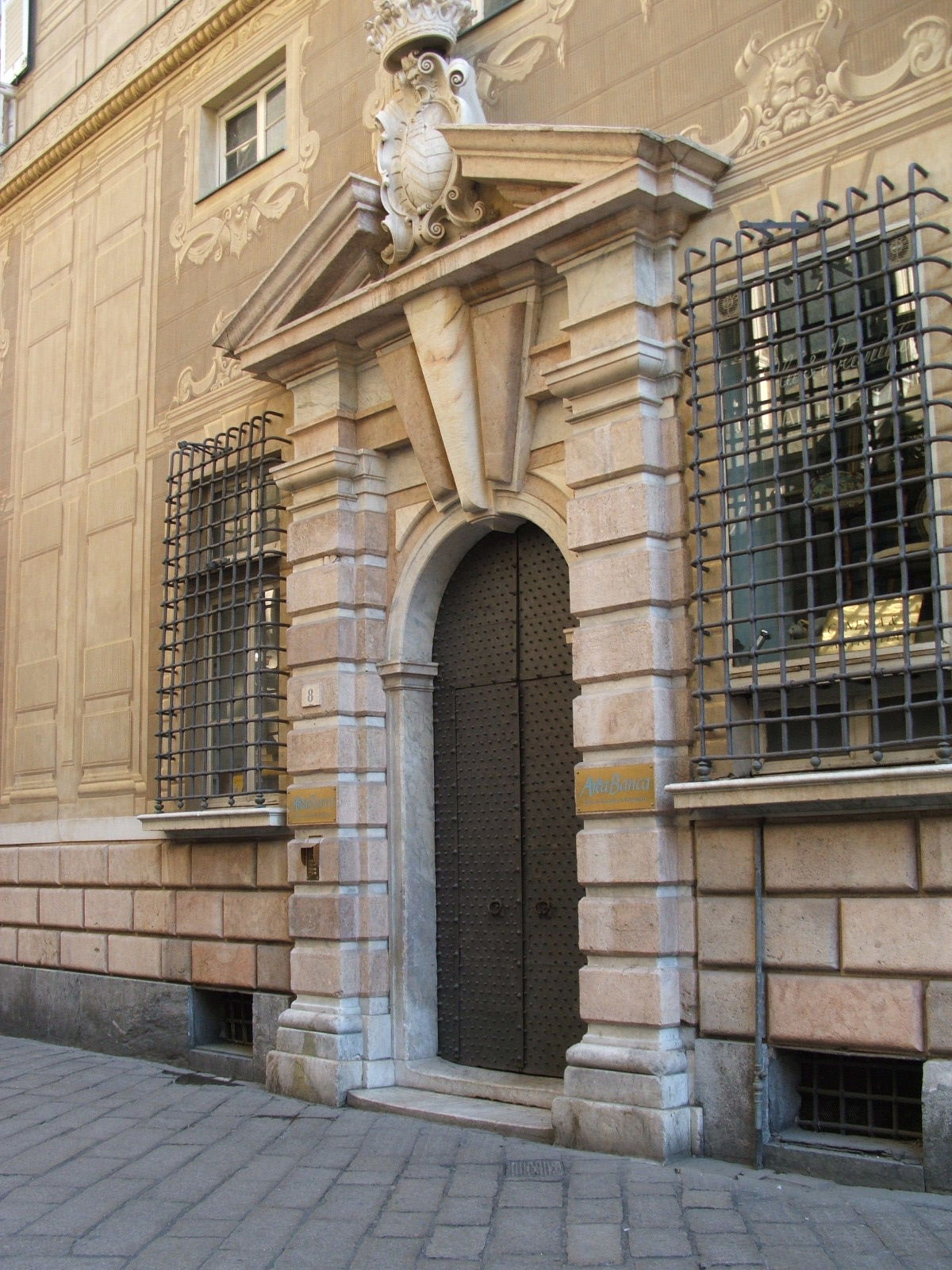
Portal of a palace on Via Garibaldi. The street, a symbol of the prosperity achieved by the city in the Century of the Genoese (El siglo de los Genoveses), was restored for the 2001 G8 and Genoa Capital of Culture 2004; the buildings house the headquarters of the City Council, several museums and the headquarters of some banks.

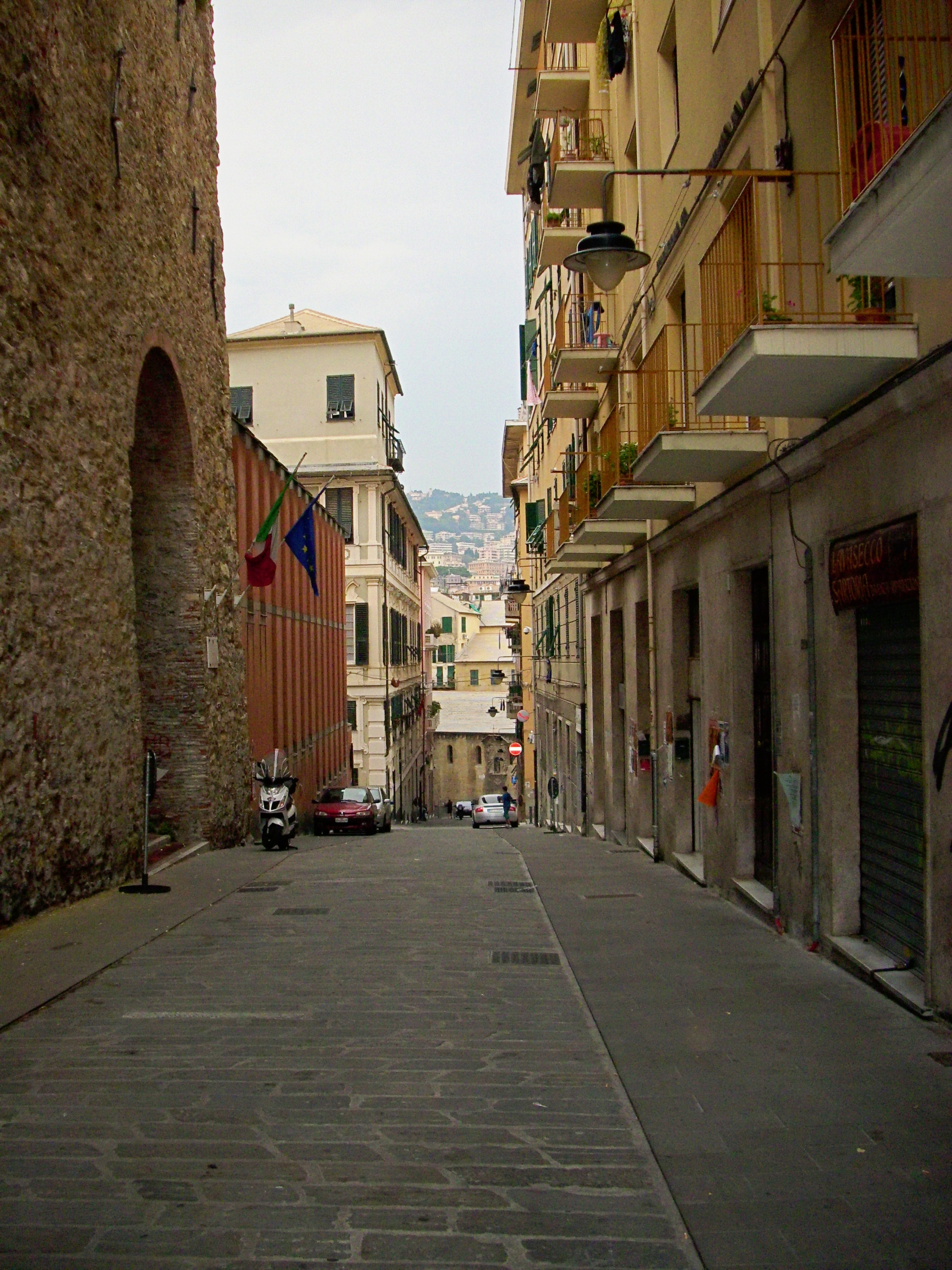
Stradone sant'Agostino (made in 1690) descends from Sarzano Square to the area of the church of San Donato. At the time of its construction it was the widest street in the city. Descending on the left side of the street is the area of the monastery of San Silvestro (17th century), the seat of the faculty of architecture; a little further on the right is the deconsecrated Gothic church of St. Augustine (built by the Augustinians in 1260), the site of the museum of the same name, and at the end is the church of San Donato (built in the 12th century but modified over the centuries) with its characteristic octagonal bell tower.

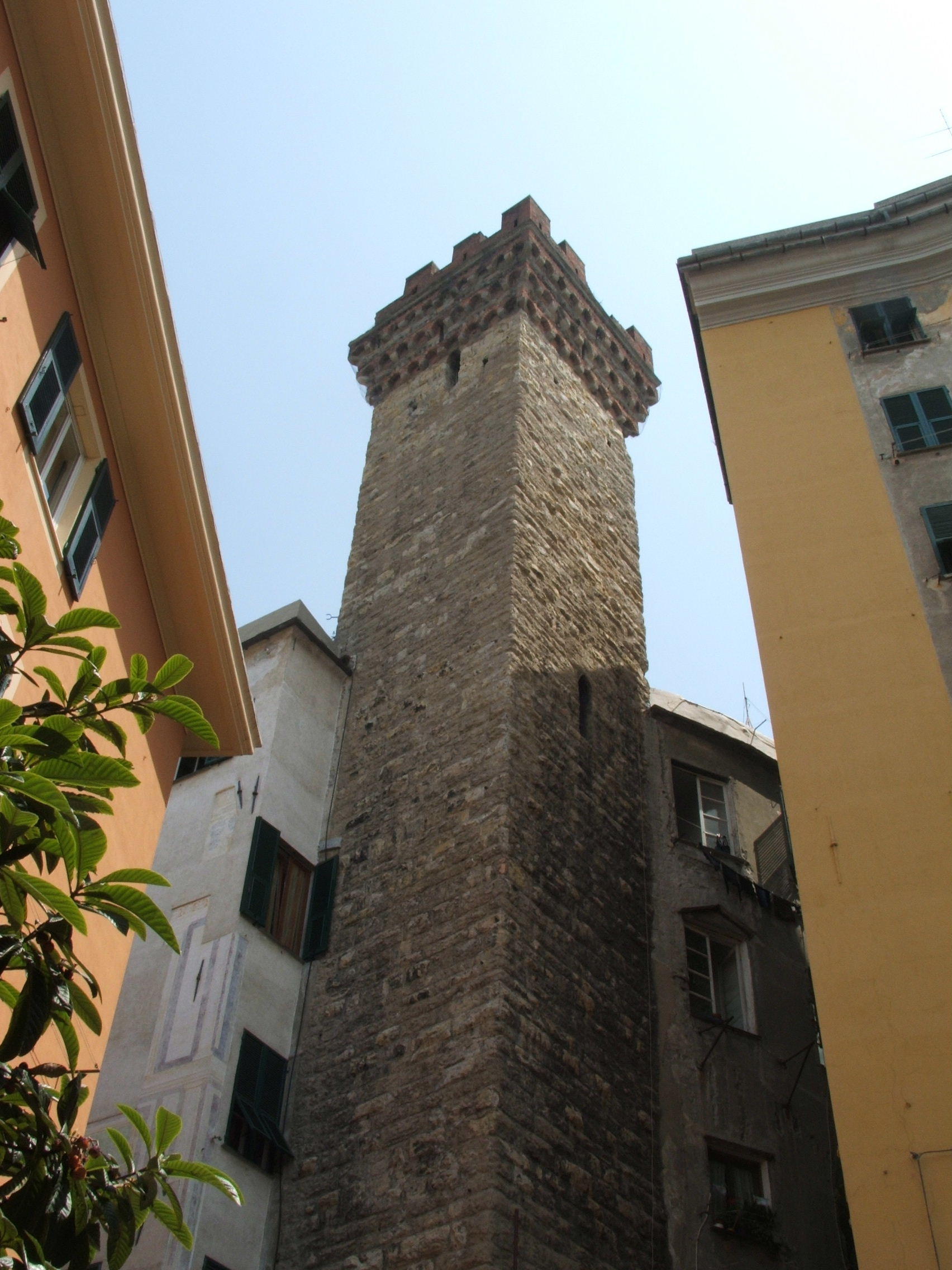
Embriaci Tower, built in the 12th century by the noble Embriaci family. When it was decided in 1196 that no tower could exceed 80 palms (roughly 20 m), this one, which reached a height of 165 palms, was spared, probably in honor of the exploits of Guglielmo Embriaco. Historian Federico Donaver, in his Le Vie di Genova (1912), points out that, at the time the tower was erected, the Embriaci family “owned almost the entire locality of Castello, but also had houses and towers in other parts of the city.^{”}

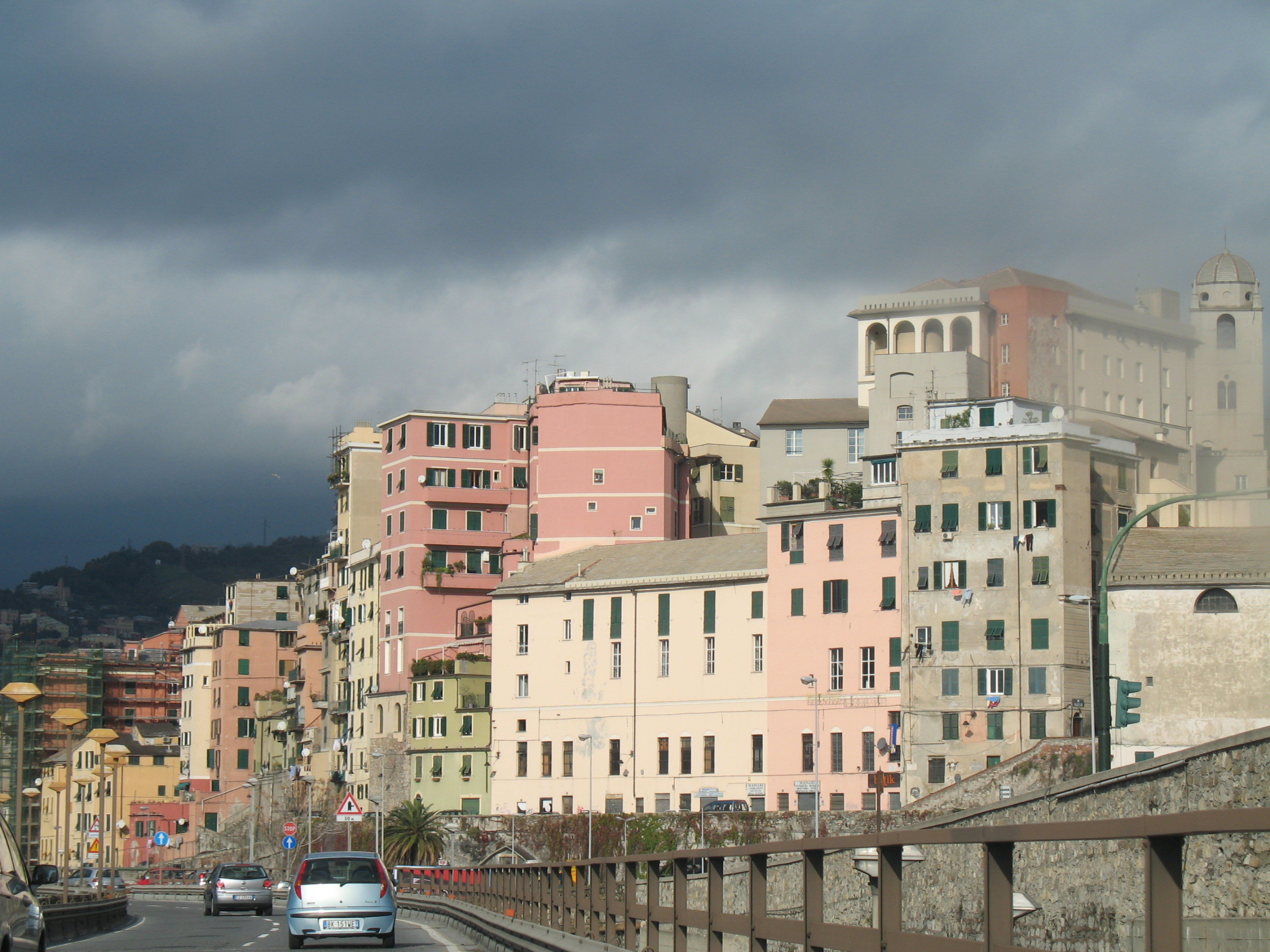
Sarzano hill photographed from the causeway. Between the street and the base of the buildings one can glimpse what remains of the Grazie and Marina walls. In the upper right corner, part of the complex of the former monastery of San Silvestro (visibly restored) and home of the Faculty of Architecture can be seen.

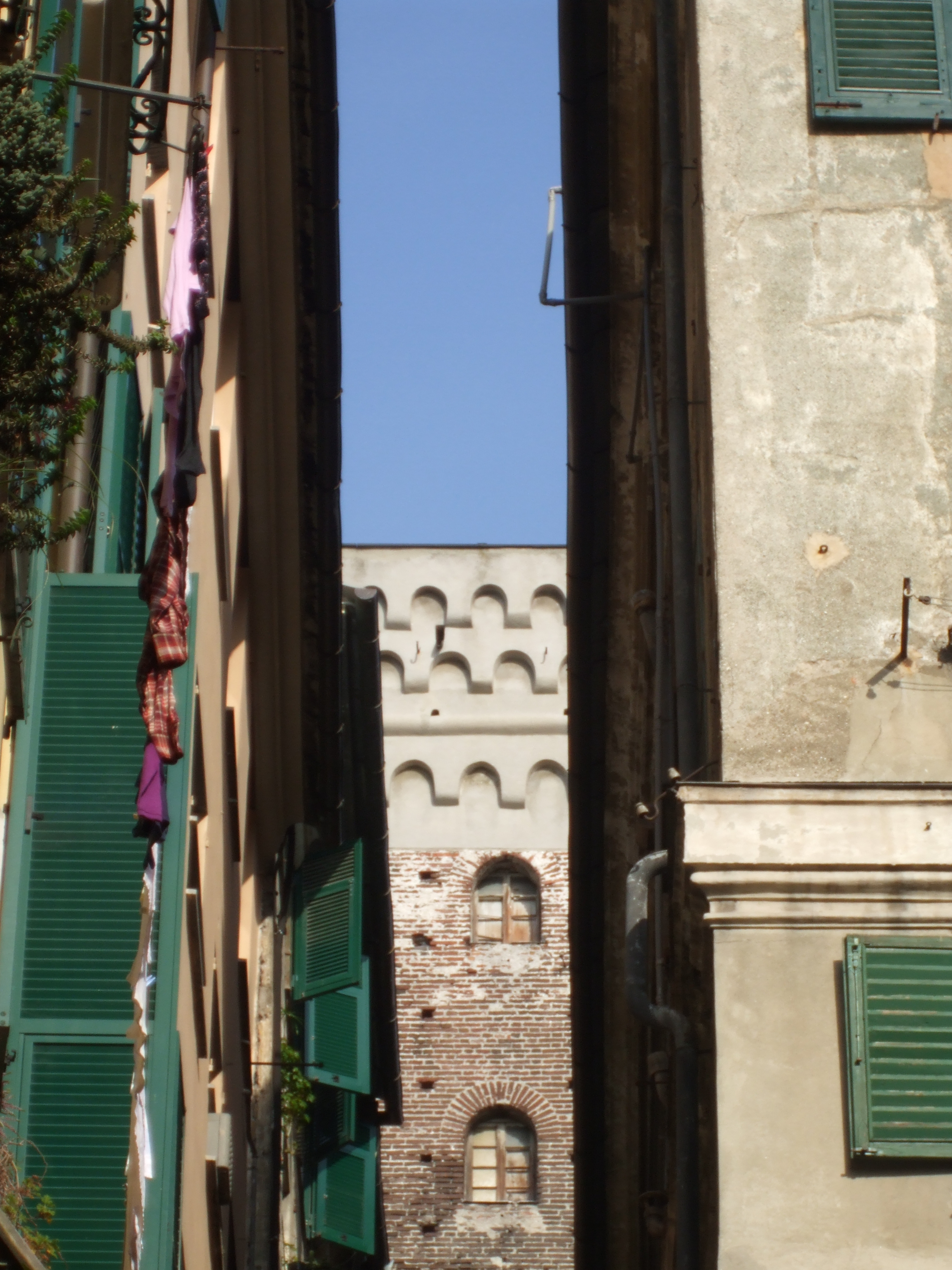
A glimpse among the narrow buildings of the historic center. Note the presence of louvers, a type of frame that is very common in Liguria.

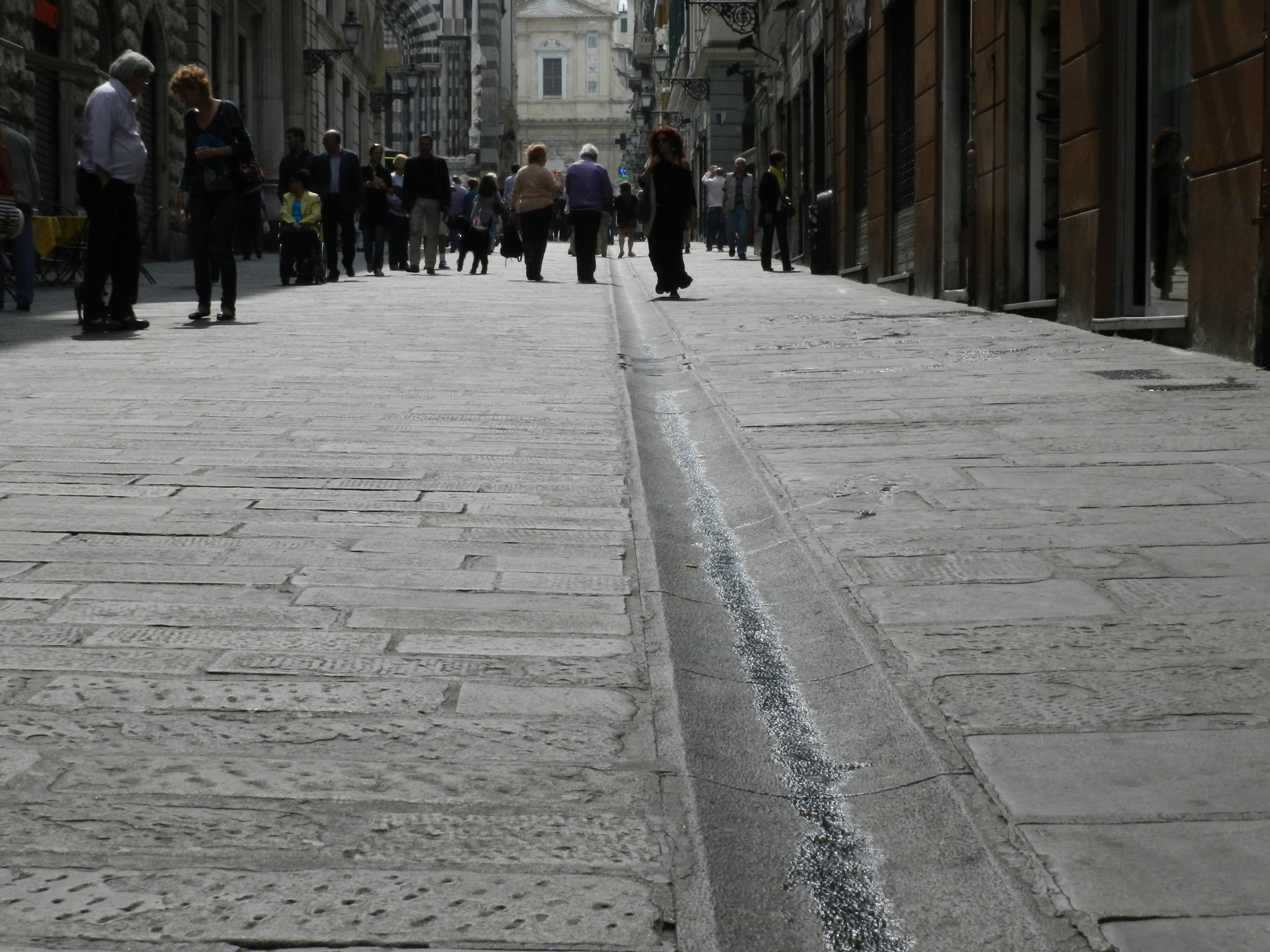
The new paving of Via San Lorenzo, one of the main streets in the historic center of Genoa, made in 2000/2001, on the occasion of the G8. The street underwent major changes in the mid-19th century as part of the construction of the second part of the Carlo Alberto carriageway, including the retreat of the facades of some buildings.

== See also ==
- Genoa: Le Strade Nuove and the system of the Palazzi dei Rolli

== Bibliography ==
- Alberta Bedocchi, Emanuela Profumo, I caruggi di Genova, Newton Compton Editori, 2007, ISBN 978-88-541-0929-2
- Andrea Carmeli, Guida agli edifici storici genovesi del xv secolo, The Boopen, ISBN 978-88-6581-111-5
- Corinna Praga; Laura Monaco. Una giornata nella città – Suggerimenti per la visita e la lettura pluridisciplinare del centro storico di Genova. Genova: Sagep editrice.
- Pastorino, Piero (1999). Botteghe e vicoli. Itinerario genovese nel centro storico. Genova: ed. De Ferrari.
- Piera Melli, La città ritrovata, Archeologia urbana a Genova 1984-1994, Tormena Editore, 1996, ISBN 88-86017-62-6
- Paola Motta, Le Strade Nuove, collana Guide di Genova, nuova serie, Sagep editrice, Genova 1986
- Paola Motta, Itinerario nel centro storico, collana Guide di Genova, nuova serie, Sagep editrice, Genova 1986
- Riccardo Navone, Viaggio nei caruggi. Edicole votive, pietre e portali, Fratelli Frilli Editori, Genova, 2007 ISBN 978-88-7563-334-9
- Vigna, Elio (1999). Centro Storico di Genova – inquietudini e incanti – 60 tra le migliori fotografie elaborate autonomamente dagli studenti del primo anno del corso di Percezione e Comunicazione Visiva del Diploma Universitario in Disegno Industriale. Genova: ed. De Ferrari.
