= San Teodoro (Genoa) =

Neighborhood in Genoa, Italy

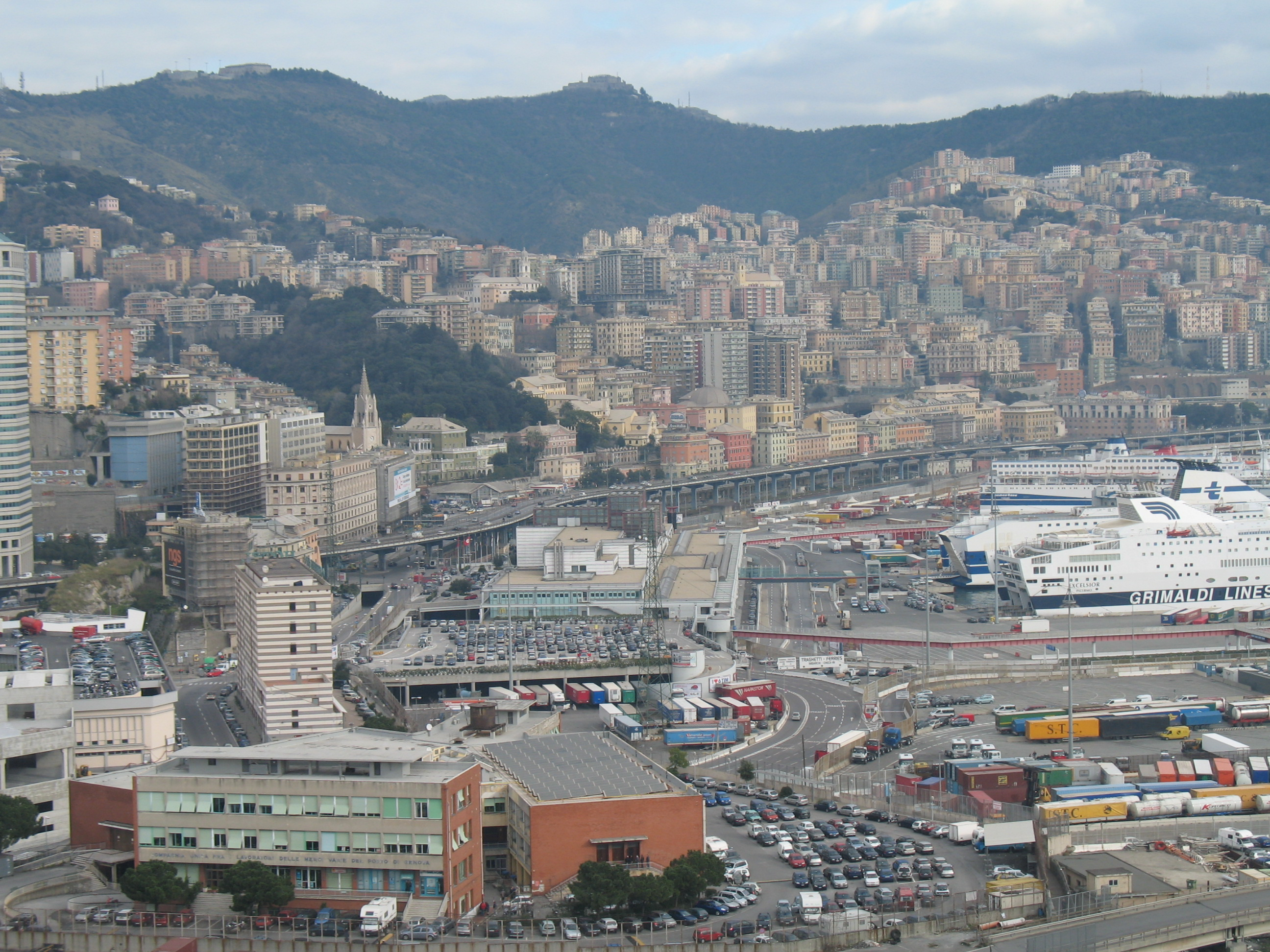
- The easternmost part of the San Teodoro neighborhood as seen from the Lighthouse

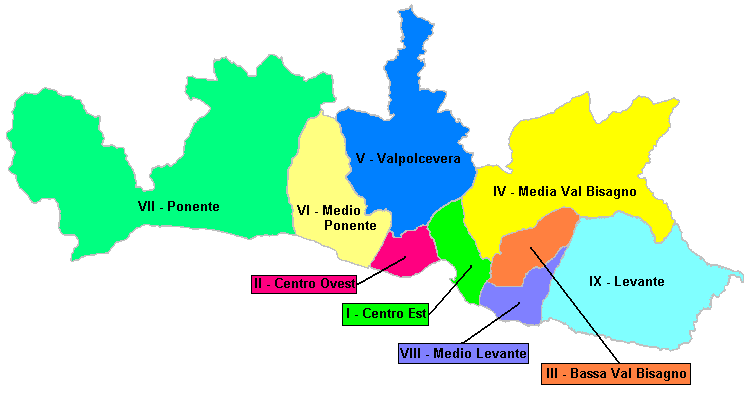
- Map of the districts of Genoa
- Country: Italy
- Region: Liguria
- Province: Genoa
- City: Genoa
- Circoscrizione: Municipio II Centro Est
- Postal code: 16126 - 16127
- Area: 1,78 km²
- Population: 23049
- Density: 12 948,88 Inh./km²

San Teodoro (San Tiodöo /saŋ tjuˈdɔːu/ in Ligurian) is a neighborhood of Genoa, sandwiched between the districts of Sampierdarena to the west, Rivarolo to the northwest, and Lagaccio and Prè to the east. Toward the south, the neighborhood faces the port area between the Maritime Station and the Lighthouse, which is mainly dedicated to passenger traffic (cruise terminal and ferry terminal).

== Description of the neighborhood ==
The former "San Teodoro" district, a hinge between the city center and the west Genoese neighborhoods, is part, along with Sampierdarena, of the Municipio II Centro Ovest and includes the "Angeli" and "San Teodoro" urban units, which together have a population of 23,049 (updated figure as of December 31, 2010).

The central area of the neighborhood is commonly referred to as “Dinegro,” named after the square named after the historic Genoese family on which Villa Rosazza and St. Theodore Church overlook, across the railroad tracks.

=== Toponym ===
The neighborhood is named after the old church of St. Theodore, demolished in 1870 for the expansion of port infrastructure and rebuilt a short distance from the original site.

== Territory ==
San Teodoro, the westernmost of the sestieri into which the city of Genoa was divided, remained outside the city walls for centuries and was incorporated into the defensive circle only in the 17th century with the construction of the Mura Nuove.

The ancient sestiere of S. Teodoro had a much larger territory than the present neighborhood, since in the 1970s to the east the areas of Oregina and Lagaccio were detached, which went to form the new "Oregina-Lagaccio" district, now included in the Municipio I Centro Est.

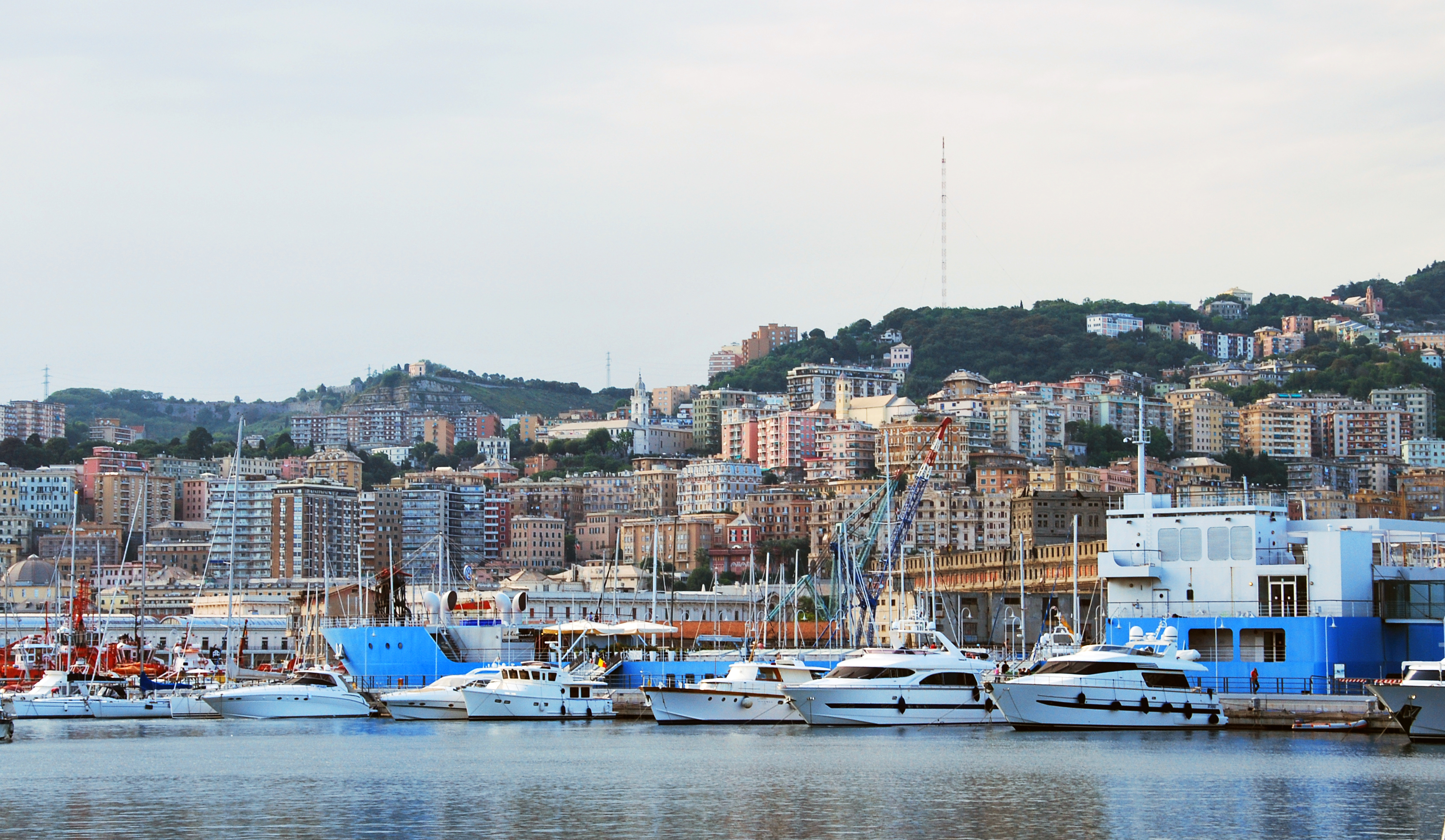
View of the neighborhood from the Maritime Station

Until the 1930s, the boundary of the district towards Sampierdarena was sharply delineated by the ridge of the hills of S. Benigno and of the Angels, on which ran the western branch of the seventeenth-century walls. Today, after the imposing earthworks on the hill of S. Benigno, the boundary is formed by the line that starting from the Lighthouse passes through the overpass of Via di Francia (commonly called the helicoidal bridge) and over the steep escarpment corresponding to the edge of the hill of S. Benigno, reaches the "walls of the Angels." From there it follows the walls to the Granarolo gate: this section separates S. Teodoro from the Polceverasque neighborhood of Rivarolo. Salita Granarolo, the axis of the Principe-Granarolo rack tramway and Principe Square demarcate S. Teodoro to the east toward Lagaccio and Prè.

The central core of the district consists of the ancient hamlet of Fassolo, aligned along the street of the same name between Piazza Dinegro and Piazza Principe, an ancient road axis now bordered by the modern Via B. Buozzi and Adua, overlooking the port. The hilly area includes in the western zone the Angeli district, made up of modern blocks of flats built after World War II near the walls of the same name and older houses along the Salita degli Angeli; the area behind Fassolo, which remained sparsely populated for a long time, has been intensely urbanized in the last century, developing along the Via Venezia - Via Bologna axis and encompassing the hills on which the sanctuary of San Francesco da Paola and the church of S. Rocco once stood isolated. Above, near the walls, is the ancient village of Granarolo, along an ancient road heading inland.

The area created by leveling the hill of S. Benigno is mainly occupied by offices and services: of the ancient hamlet of Chiappella, at the foot of the hill, only a few houses remain in Via Milano, in front of the ferry terminal, which survived the earthworks and the explosion in the San Benigno tunnel on October 10, 1944, which claimed two thousand lives.

In Piazza R. Sopranis, in the area of Via Venezia, has stood since the 1920s the civic industrial technical institute G. Galilei, the first in Liguria of this type, which has trained hundreds of technicians over the decades, many of whom, particularly between 1960 and 1990, found employment in the large industries of the west of Genoa.

== Demographics ==
The S. Teodoro sestiere was the least populated in the entire city. In 1777 there were 3,181 inhabitants, in 1837 according to Casalis they had risen to 7,050, at the 1861 census they were 10,427. In 1862 it was planned to build “houses for the less affluent class,” also favoring them with tax concessions, but it was not until the end of the century that there was a substantial increase in population (21,779 inhabitants in 1901). Growth continued in the following decades, with a high of 29.625 inhabitants in 1971. Since then, there has been a decrease in the population, also due to the separation of Oregina and Lagaccio, to the current number of 23,049 inhabitants.

== History ==
=== Origins ===
The oldest nucleus of the sestiere of S. Teodoro, the first documented records of which date back to the 11th century, had formed in the Fassolo area around the church dedicated to the martyr saint Theodore of Amasea, which at the end of the 12th century was entrusted by the archbishop of Genoa to the Canons Regular of Mortara. The village, outside the city walls and then inhabited by a few fishing families, was being shaped as a thoroughfare along the mule tracks that led from Genoa through the Polcevera valley to the west and inland. In 1132, on the hill of Promontorio, to the west of the town, the Abbey of St. Benigno was built with a hospice for pilgrims; a few years later, the Hospital of St. Lazzaro was built with a hospice for the sick, and in the 15th century the Convent of St. Mary of the Angels was built, also with a hospice.

=== Development of the neighborhood between the fourteenth and seventeenth centuries ===
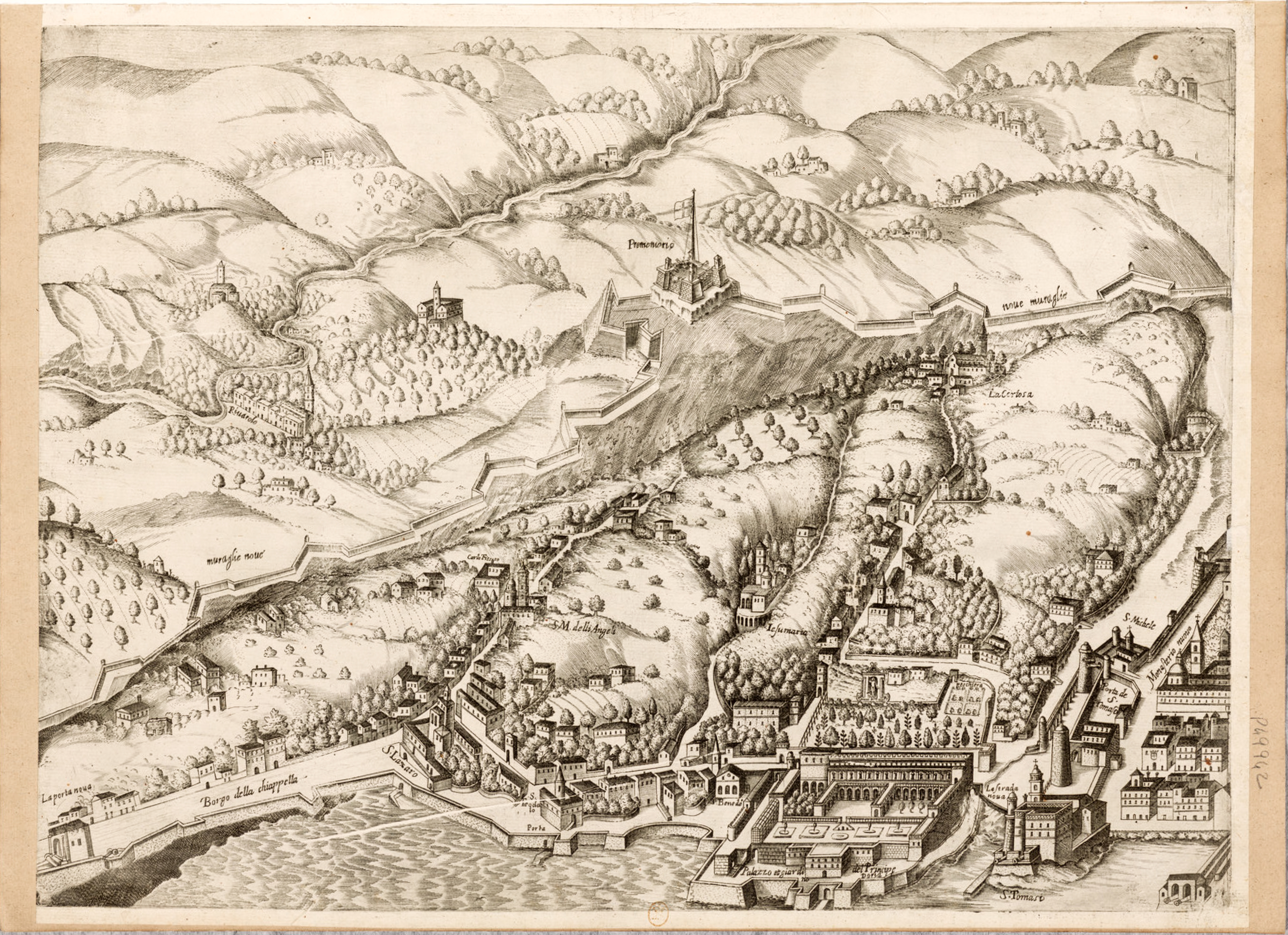
The area of the San Teodoro neighborhood in a detailed 1637 map by Alessandro Baratta, the Villa del Principe, the old church of San Teodoro and the Giant of Sparzo are already visible

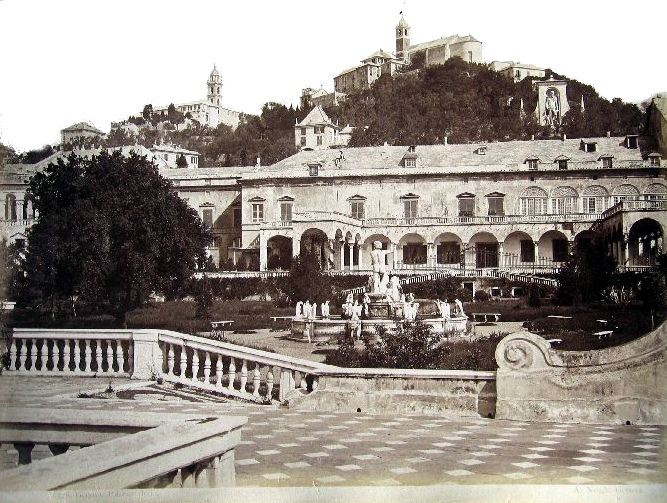
The Prince's Palace in a 19th-century image by Alfred Noack

In 1350 the extension of the walls toward the west was completed: the new city wall, with the St. Thomas Gate, reached the threshold of the village. By the mid-12th century the first signal tower had been built on the promontory that closed the harbor inlet to the west, which with later transformations would become the present Lighthouse. In 1507, during French rule, the “Briglia,” a fortress overlooking the harbor, with cannons aimed at the city, was built at its foot, which was conquered and destroyed by the Genoese in 1514 after a two-year siege. On this occasion the early Lighthouse suffered severe damage and was rebuilt in its present form in 1543.

In 1530 Andrea Doria had his palace built in the Fassolo area, just outside the city walls, in which he hosted ambassadors and heads of state, including Emperor Charles V.

Giustiniani, a bishop and historian, described the area of S. Teodoro as follows in his “Annals” in the early decades of the 16th century:

... a small monastery... with the name of St. Mary of the Angels, residence of the Observant Carmelites, and at the head of the promontory the ancient Abbey of St. Benigno, in which lies the body of the venerable Bede...... And below the abbey, towards the south, is the tower or half tower of the lighthouse, built on a rock called Capo di Faro. ... And from the aforementioned tower of Capo di Faro, in the direction of Genoa, one passes through a small villa called the Chiapella, which contains six houses of citizens and twenty-five of artisans and common people. And one enters... the villa of Fassiolo, which is almost a suburb of the city. It contains the house of the lepers of St. Lazarus, the monastery of St. Theodore, where the canons regular of St. Augustine live, the monastery of St. Benedict, where the nuns of the Cistercian order used to live, now very deserted, and a hospice adjoining St. Benedict, where pilgrims are sheltered. And in this villa there are twelve houses of the villagers and twenty-seven of the citizens, among which the splendid and magnificent palace of Andrea D'Oria, prince of Melfi, stands out. ... And behind the villa of Fassolo there is a small area called Caldetto, where was built the convent of the Friars of Jesus, Mary, of the Order of the Minims, founded in our time by St. Francis of Paola. ... Then there is Upper Granarolo, a villa of fourteen houses, and then Lower Granarolo, with the church of St. Giacobo and the convent of St. Margherita, where nuns used to live: there are eighteen houses in this villa.

— Agostino Giustiniani, Annals of the Republic of Genoa, 1537

In the 16th century on the slopes of the hill was built by the Di Negro family the palace known as “lo Scoglietto,” now known as Villa Rosazza, at the time overlooking the sea and with a large park on the hill behind.

=== The New Walls and the sestiere of S. Teodoro ===
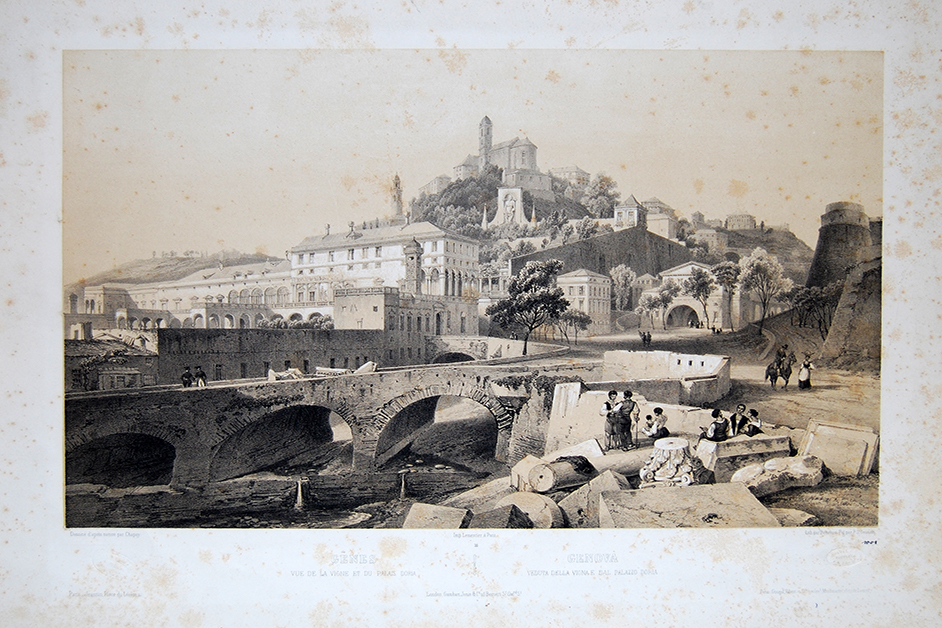
Lithograph from the mid-1800s of the Prince's Palace and the hill on which the church of San Rocco stands above Principe, Marcello Sparzo's Giant in the center.

Between 1626 and 1632, with the construction of the "Mura Nuove" (New Walls) along the ridge dividing the Genoese area from the Polcevera Valley, the whole area was incorporated within the defensive walls; S. Teodoro and San Vincenzo (another area of the city incorporated within the circle of the walls), were counted among the city's sestieri, joining the four historical sestieri.

According to Goffredo Casalis's description of it in the Dizionario geografico storico statistico commerciale degli Stati di S.M. il Re di Sardegna, published in Turin in 1840, the sestiere comprised, like that of S. Vincenzo, the territory between the fourth and last city walls. Placed at the western end, it joined the sestiere of San Vincenzo at the top of Mount Peralto, on which Fort Sperone, the high point of the Mura Nuove, is located. The boundary between the two sestieri was marked by the moat of St. Hugh.

To complete the new circle of walls, the cliff in front of the village of Fassolo was also enclosed by a wall, on which a cannon battery was placed.

=== The nineteenth century ===
The nineteenth century was an eventful one for the neighborhood: in 1815, under the direction of the architect Carlo Barabino, the road along the port, now Via Milano, was opened to traffic; between 1840 and 1853 the Turin-Genoa railway line was built, which crossed, with a long elevated section, the entire Fassolo area, with heavy impacts on residential structures. In addition to part of the gardens of the stately villas, the church of S. Lazzaro with the adjoining hospital and the oratory of N.S. del Rosario (later rebuilt on another site further upstream) also had to be sacrificed. The Church of San Teodoro was in a precarious situation, squeezed between the new road system and the port infrastructure, which was also being expanded, and would later be demolished in 1870.

Casalis thus describes the sestiere of S. Teodoro shortly before the middle of the century:

The sestiere was named after the titular saint of its main parish. To the south it has the port and to the northeast the Polcevera valley. The entrance to this area is through the Gate of the Lighthouse, the Gate of the Angels and the Gate of Granarolo. And since this is the side of the city that communicates with Turin, Lombardy and France, it is not necessary to say that this is the part of Genoa where coaches, carriages, wagons and carts compete in greater numbers. In spite of these advantages, the sestiere is sparsely populated, because there are few houses, very few shops, and a large part of the surface is in steep ravines, where only a little grass grows, which in May pleases the eyes of the Genoese, who look at the rugged banks covered with a green carpet and glazed with colors. In 1837 there were 7050 inhabitants in 527 houses.

The parishes are: S. Teodoro, S. Rocco of Granarolo, S. Lazzaro, rectory, and S. Benedetto, noble parish of Prince Doria.

Inhabitants. Many of them work in the fields, since such a large area is cultivated with vineyards and olive groves. Many of the women work as laundresses, either in the trough next to Prince Doria's aqueduct or in the moat of St. Thomas. Since this is where the goods shipped to northern Italy are loaded, and since many carriers and muleteers work there, it is not necessary to say that there are many porters, innkeepers, and other people necessary for the service and lodging of those who transport the goods. In general, the permanent residents of the sestiere are more like peasants than citizens.

— Goffredo Casalis, "Dizionario geografico, storico, statistico e commerciale degli stati di S.M. il Re di Sardegna", 1841

The historic buildings that have disappeared

The urban planning changes of the 19th century led to the disappearance of several centuries-old buildings in the neighborhood; in addition to the church of St. Theodore and the nearby oratory, the historic St. Benigno Abbey and the medieval hospital of St. Lazarus were demolished.

- St. Benigno Abbey. The church named after the martyred saint St. Benignus, with the adjoining Benedictine monastery had been built in the 12th century. The complex, which also included a hospice for wayfarers, was active for nearly seven centuries. First incorporated into the 17th-century “New Walls,” it was then permanently closed in 1798 due to the Napoleonic suppression laws and used as barracks and warehouse by the Savoy army. Around 1850 what remained of the complex was demolished to build the two large barracks.
- St. Lazarus Hospital. Also in the 12th century, near the mouth of the St. Lazarus stream, at the beginning of the Salita degli Angeli a shelter for the sick had been built, with a church dedicated to St. Lazarus attached. The institution functioned for as many as seven centuries, until it was demolished in the mid-19th century for the construction of the railroad. Believed to be one of the oldest lazarettos in Italy, second only to the one in Milan, it was founded in 1150 by a certain Buonmartino and over the centuries, through the support of numerous benefactors, it offered shelter and hospitality to the poorest of the poor, first only to lepers and later to the sick of all kinds. The hospital in 1662 was attached to the Albergo dei Poveri, which administered it until the mid-19th century, when the complex was demolished for the construction of the railroad. Around 1845, 4,000 liras were allocated annually for the maintenance of the hospital. Under the floor of the church of St. Lazarus was a second underground church; eleven columns supported its vault, which formed the floor of the upper church. These columns were not all the same, both in shape and type of marble, probably due to the reuse of early medieval materials from destroyed buildings.

On April 5, 1849, during Genoa's insurrection against the Savoy government, General Alfonso La Marmora had the city bombarded from the square in front of the now deconsecrated abbey of S. Benigno; having suppressed the insurrection, it was La Marmora himself who suggested the reinforcement of the site, to prevent new uprisings. So it was that, in the following years, having demolished the ancient abbey, the two barracks were built, which disappeared in the next century with the excavation of the entire hill. The two buildings, named "Lower Barracks of St. Benigno" and "Upper Barracks of St. Benigno," in relation to each other's position, were two large, five-story buildings, 160 meters long, each capable of housing about 1,200 soldiers.

Around 1870 the new Magazzini Generali were built in the harbor area, for the construction of which the church of San Teodoro was demolished, in place of which a new temple was erected at the beginning of Via Venezia; a few years later, in 1876 a large terrace overlooking the harbor, adorned with cast-iron railings and lit with gas lanterns, was built along Via San Teodoro (present-day Via Milano), which became a popular place for walks and events. The terraces also disappeared in the 1920s to make way for the widening of Via Milano and Via Buozzi.

In the second half of the century, the district, like others, underwent great changes in the urban aspect, with a large increase in population and the beginning of residential building development in the hillside area, which would continue on a massive scale in the first decades of the twentieth century, accompanied by installations related mainly, but not only, to port activities; among them, the S.A. I.G. ice factory built in 1887 in Piazza Sopranis, active until after World War II, as demand declined with the proliferation of household refrigerators. The factory was closed for good in 1984. Today a modern apartment building stands in its place.

Serving the military installations, in the area of Via Milano stood the large Chiappella military hospital, created in 1801 by the transformation of a 17th-century convent suppressed by Napoleonic laws. The hospital was active until World War II, when it was destroyed by air and sea bombardments.

=== The twentieth century ===
In terms of urban planning in the new century a series of important events profoundly changed the westernmost area of the neighborhood. Due to the changed international political situation and the advent of new technologies in the field of warfare in 1914 it was decided to decommission the city's defensive structure, including the walls and barracks overlooking the neighborhood.

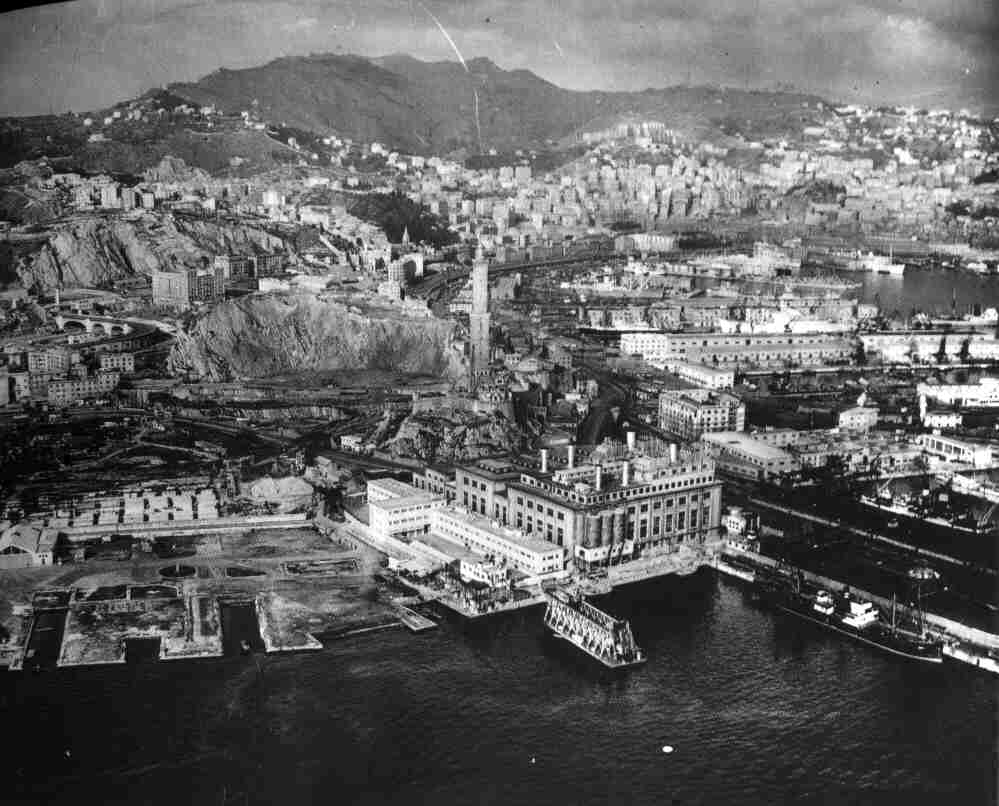
St. Benigno hill being dismantled, with the power plant in the foreground

In 1926, the enlargement of the municipality of Genoa with the annexation of neighboring municipalities and the simultaneous decision to expand the port west of the Lighthouse made it necessary to improve the road system, creating new roads connecting the port, the city and the building of the "Camionale," as well as land spaces to serve port activities.

It was thus decided to level the hill of St. Benigno with all the disused military infrastructure. Sheds and warehouses serving the port were built in the spaces created, and the new "via di Francia" was opened, which allowed a convenient connection to the west, avoiding the Lighthouse bottleneck. The materials obtained from the demolition were used for the fills necessary for the construction of the new moles in front of Sampierdarena. Also during that period, two important infrastructures related to passenger traffic were built, the Maritime Station at Ponte dei Mille, built between 1926 and 1930 (then a landing place for ocean liners and now for cruise ships), and the one at Ponte Andrea Doria, built in 1932 and rebuilt in 1950.

==== The tragedy of St. Benigno ====
On October 10, 1944, during World War II, what remained of the hill of S. Benigno was devastated by an explosion that destroyed a complex of railway tunnels, used partly by the German army as an ammunition depot, but also by the population as an air raid shelter, causing the death of at least 1,000 people (2,000 according to some sources) including refugees in the tunnels, inhabitants of the destroyed buildings above, and German soldiers. At first it was thought that the explosion had been caused by lightning, but later some blamed it on sabotage by partisan groups.

==== The aftermath of World War II ====
Another serious tragedy involved the neighborhood in 1968; on March 21 of that year, after eighteen consecutive hours of rain, a large landslide broke off from the rock face of an old abandoned quarry on the Hill of the Angels. It hit No. 8 Via Dijon, destroying 34 apartments and the death of 19 people, as well as numerous injuries. Subsequent legal proceedings (against unknown persons, given the impossibility of identifying precise responsibility) did not lead to any prosecution because the investigators deemed the event “extraordinary and unpredictable.” The building was rebuilt after the rock face had been made safe.

The development of the port infrastructure continued after the reconstruction; the port area in front of the Chiappella area (Ponte C. Colombo, Ponte B. Assereto and Ponte Caracciolo) was transformed into the well-equipped ferry terminal, built between 1993 and 1999.

Among the most significant post-war constructions are the "Elevated Highway," inaugurated in 1965, which connects the Genoa West toll station with the city centre and the Foce district, running on steel pylons along the port area, and the "Matitone," a skyscraper with a characteristic structure housing municipal offices, completed in the 1990s.

== Landmarks and places of interest ==
=== Granarolo ===
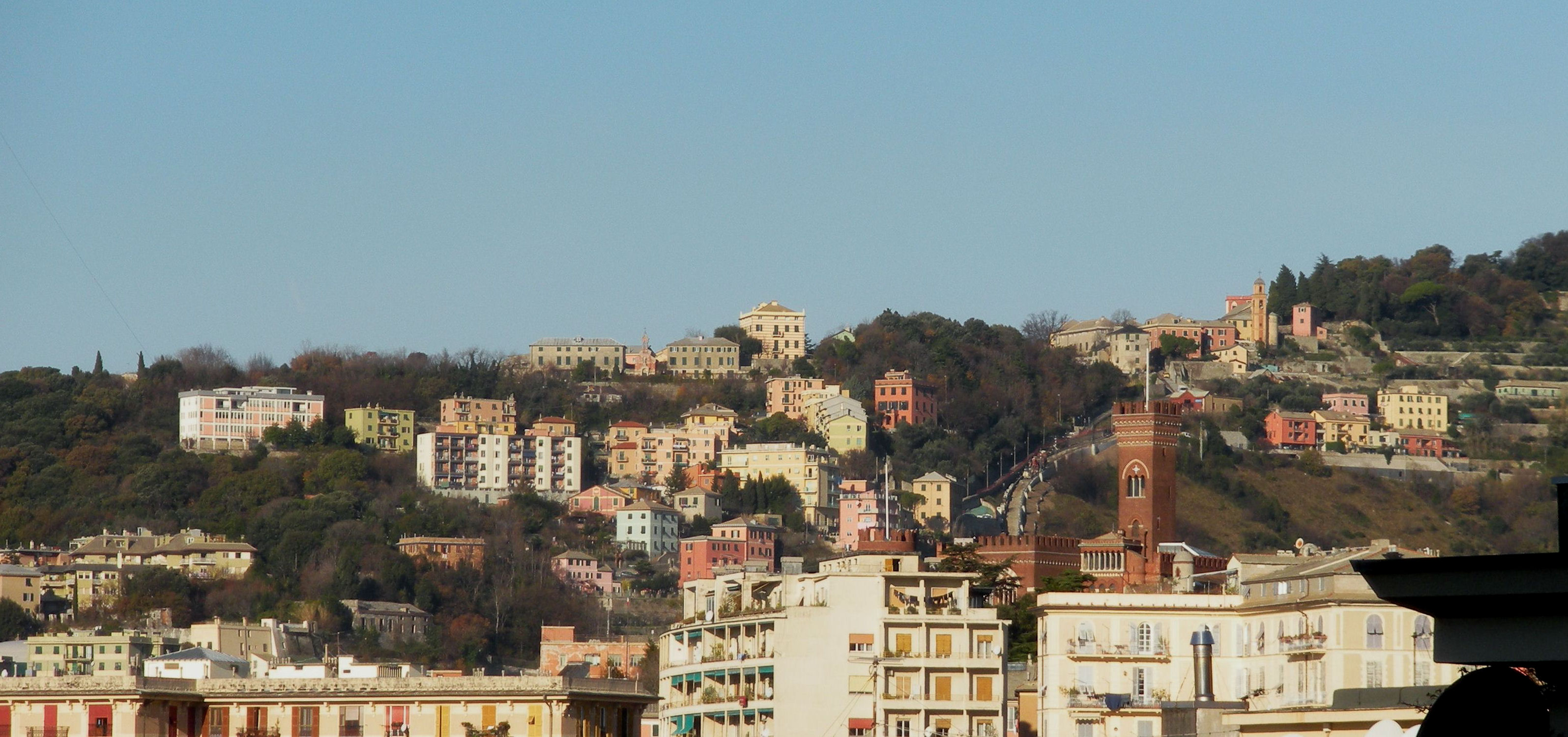
Granarolo from the esplanade of Castelletto

Granarolo is located in the most upstream part of the neighborhood. An ancient farming village and vacation spot for wealthy Genoese, it is located along the ancient road that led from the San Tomaso gate (Principe Square) toward the Polcevera Valley. With the construction of the seventeenth-century walls at this road, the gate known as the Granarolo gate was opened. Along the steep slope is the ancient church of S. Maria di Granarolo, first built in 1190.

The settlement, which has partly preserved its ancient appearance, although it has not been entirely spared from the rampant urbanisation of the 20th century, can be reached from the area of Piazza Principe by a characteristic rack railway inaugurated in 1901.

=== Civil architecture ===
==== Palazzo del Principe ====
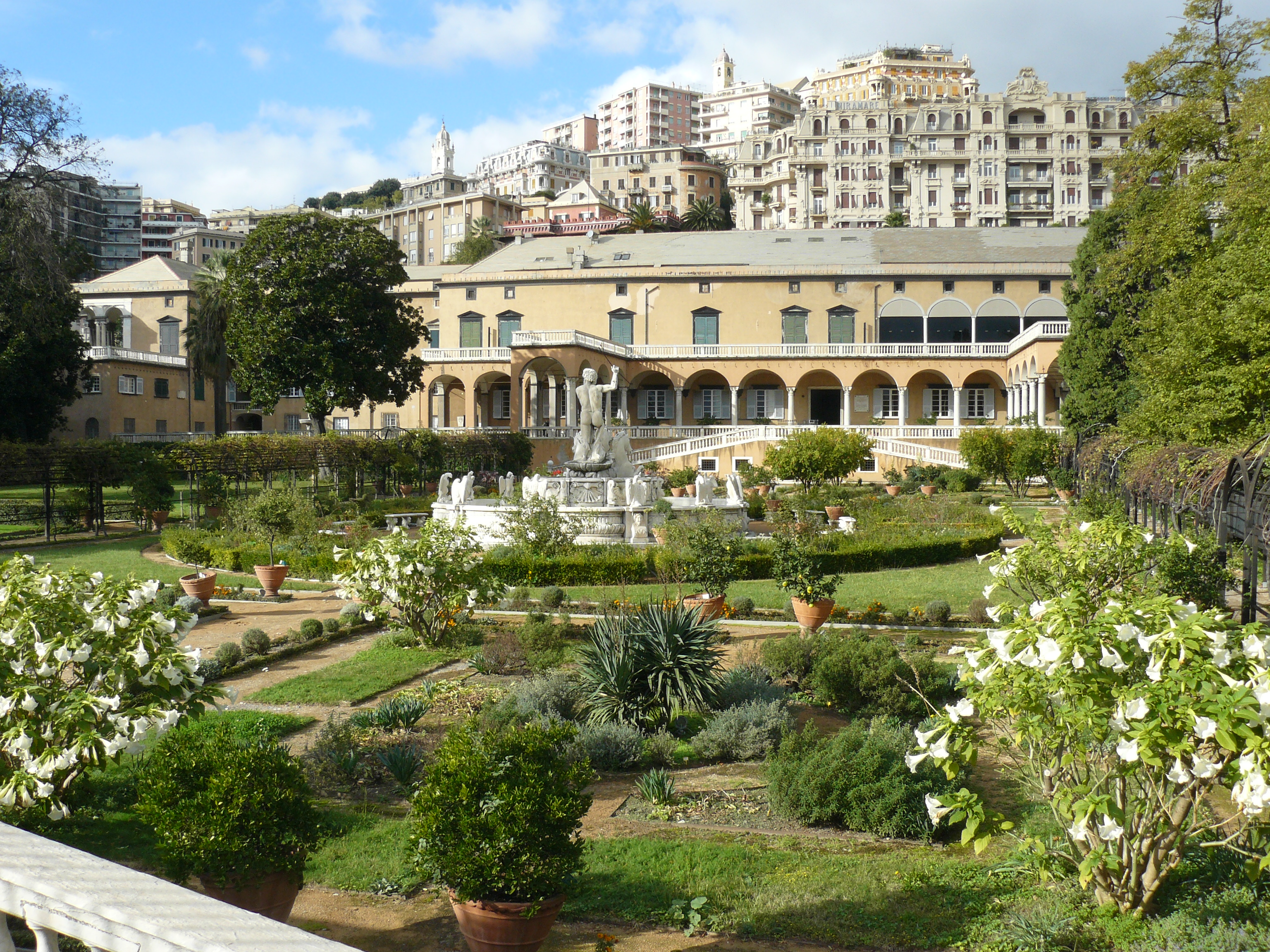
Palazzo del Principe

The Doria Pamphily palace, which Andrea Doria had built starting in 1521 in the Fassolo area by enlarging an earlier building purchased from the Lomellini family, overlooks the current Piazza del Principe, created in the 19th century by the demolition of the 16th-century gate of S. Tomaso (1840) and the church of the same name (1881). The Palazzo del Principe, one of the most sumptuous residences in sixteenth-century Genoa, was commissioned by the Genoese admiral and politician, mediator between the Republic and the Spanish Empire in the person of Charles V, who was hosted there several times.

Although Andrea Doria's hegemony over the government of the republic was more in the nature of political leadership rather than a real assertion of power, his palace, built outside the city walls and thus far from the traditional places of power, was in fact a veritable palace, in which the "Prince" received ambassadors and heads of state. In the decades that followed, the patricians of Genoa would have the sumptuous villas that can still be seen today along the Strada Nuova (Via Garibaldi) built in imitation of the palace.

The architectural and fresco decoration, aimed at exalting the patron, represented as the god Neptune, and the Emperor Charles V, represented as Jupiter, is the work of Perin del Vaga.

The villa had a monumental garden complex that covered the entire hill behind it, where at the highest point stood a giant statue of Jupiter (symbolizing Emperor Charles V), clearly visible from ships landing in the harbor. Another garden in front of the villa sloped down to a private dock for the prince's personal fleet.

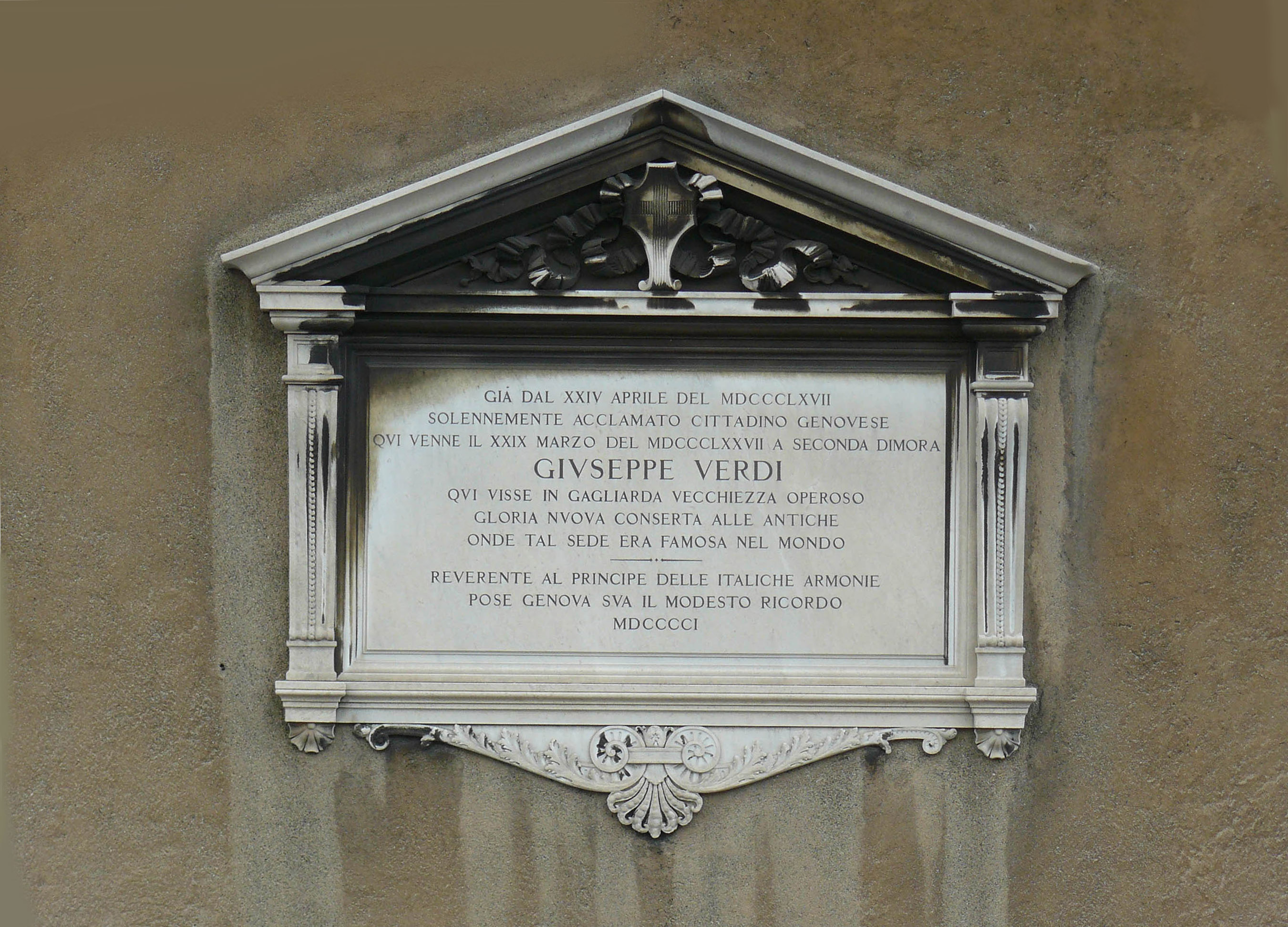
Giuseppe Verdi memorial plaque

After Andrea Doria's death (1560) the building was expanded by his grandson Giovanni Andrea. In the next century a period of decline began for the palace, when another Giovanni Andrea, who had married a Pamphili in 1671, moved the furnishings and archives to Rome. It was not until 1805 that it was hastily restored by Carlo Barabino and furnished by Emanuele Andrea Tagliafichi, having to accommodate Napoleon. After 1877 the composer Giuseppe Verdi used to spend the summer there, a circumstance commemorated by a plaque on the facade.

In addition to Perin del Vaga, artists such as Domenico Beccafumi, Giovanni Angelo Montorsoli, Giovanni Ponzello and Antonio Roderio worked there at different times.

Between the mid-nineteenth century and the first decades of the twentieth century, with the construction of the railroad (1853), the expansion of the port (1875), the construction of the Miramare Hotel (1913) and the Maritime Station (1930), and the opening of Via Adua (1935) it completely lost its connection with the port, the gardens facing uphill and most of the one facing the sea. In 1944 it was also severely damaged by bombing; only in 2001, after a restoration that lasted several years, was the recovery of the facade, the interior decorations, the garden with the fountains of Neptune (by Taddeo Carlone, 1599) and Triton (by Giovanni Angelo Montorsoli, 1543) and the frescoes by Perin del Vaga completed. The palace also houses some valuable tapestries dating from the 15th and 16th centuries.

==== Villa Rosazza ====
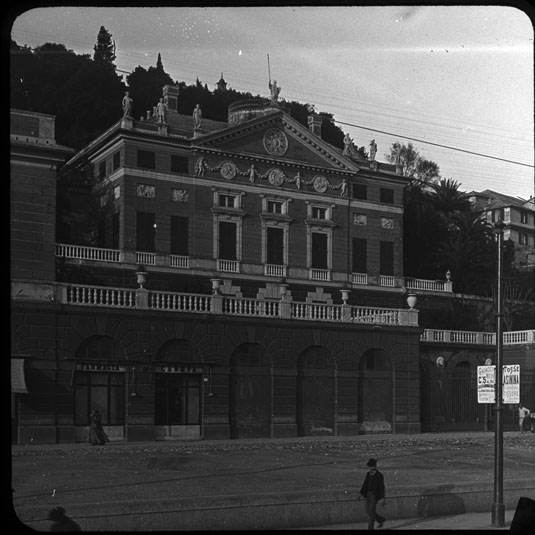
Villa Rosazza in a photograph of the time

Villa Rosazza, known as “dello Scoglietto,” is the westernmost of the suburban villas in historic Genoa. It was built around 1565 for Doge Ambrogio Di Negro in the Mannerist style, with a garden by the sea, landing stage, and a large garden going up the hill, now a public park (in the process of redevelopment after years of decay), with terraces, fountains, nymphaeums, and numerous valuable botanical species. Today the front garden, which reached directly to the sea, has completely disappeared due to the expansion of the port, the construction of the railway and the new road system: the villa faces Dinegro Square, from which it remains separated by the railway, the construction of which made it necessary to rearrange the access with ramps and underpasses. The interior decoration is lavish, with works by Andrea Ansaldo and Agostino Tassi.

In 1787, after the property had passed to the Durazzo family, Count Gian Luca Durazzo commissioned major restorations to Andrea Tagliafichi, to whom are due the current neoclassical facade and the arrangement of the English landscape park with a small temple, which concludes the garden facing uphill. The facade decorations are the work of the Genoese sculptor Nicolò Traverso, to whom is also due a statue depicting Ansaldo Grimaldi (1471–1539). Another statue, by Francesco Ravaschio (1743–1820), depicts Doge Giovanni Battista Cambiaso. These two statues, torn down during the 1797 uprisings and abandoned in Principe Square, were recovered and restored a few years later by Giovanni Durazzo, who had them relocated to the villa.

In 1815, Caroline of Brunswick, wife of the future King of England George IV, was a guest in the villa, receiving there a visit from Pope Pius VII who, after Napoleon's flight from the island of Elba and the ephemeral reconstitution of the French Empire had briefly sought shelter in Genoa, where he was a guest in the Royal Palace.

Marquis Lorenzo Pareto (1800–1865), who was minister of the Kingdom of Sardinia and senator of the Kingdom, as well as a geologist, lived in the villa for a long time.

Today the villa, owned by the municipality of Genoa, is home to the "Casa America Foundation," founded in 1999, an institution that aims to promote cultural exchanges as well as economic and trade relations with Latin American countries.

==== Lighthouse of Genoa ====
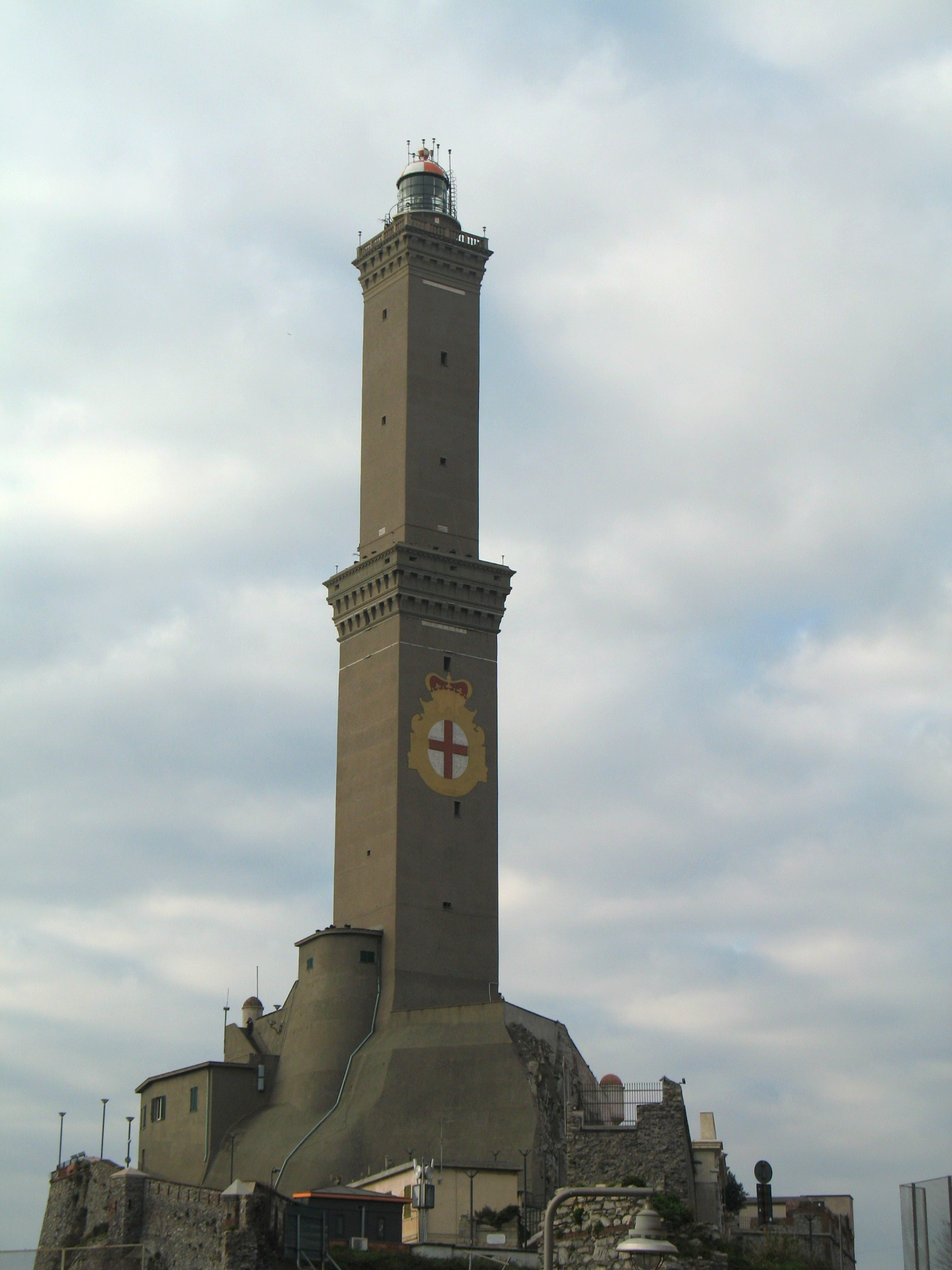
The Lighthouse

At the western edge of the old port, between the districts of S. Teodoro and Sampierdarena, on the remains of what was once the Capo di Faro stands the tower of the Lighthouse, a conventional symbol of Genoa, clearly visible from many parts of the city.

The lighthouse, the oldest of those still in operation in the world, stands 76 m tall and consists of two square trunks separated by a corbelled frame, culminating in the dome of the light apparatus, which is located at 117 m above sea level. The beam of light, with intermittent flashes, is visible up to 33 miles away.

On the site where the Lighthouse stands today, there had existed since the 12th century a lookout and signal tower, also used as a prison, near which King Louis XII in 1507 had a fortress built, called "la Briglia," which was besieged and destroyed by the Genoese in 1514. The fighting against the French for the liberation of the city also caused very serious damage to the structure of the tower, which was rebuilt in its present form in 1543, possibly to the design of Giovanni Maria Olgiati or Francesco di Gandria.

With the expansion of the port in the 1920s, the tip of Capo di Faro remained completely buried by the construction of new piers. Between 1926 and 1928, at the foot of the lighthouse, a 300 MW coal-fired power plant was built, now owned by Enel, which was scheduled to be closed by 2017.

The tower has been open to visitors since 1996. In 2001, a pedestrian promenade was built that reaches the base of the lighthouse. A staircase of 375 steps reaches the top of the tower, from where the view overlooks the city, the harbor, the surrounding hills topped by forts, the Riviera di Levante to the Portofino promontory, and the Riviera di Ponente.

In the popular song Ma se ghe penso, the Lighthouse is one of the landmarks of Genoa evoked with nostalgia by a Genoese man who emigrated to South America.

===== Museum of the Lighthouse =====
A room inside the surviving stretch of walls at the foot of the lighthouse has been home since 2004 to a museum dedicated to the history and traditions of Genoa, told through videos and photographs. Also on display are objects and tools related to the history of lighthouses.

==== Matitone ====
The Matitone is a high-rise building used as a business center located in the area of the former St. Benigno hill, between Via di Francia and the terminal section of Via A. Cantore. It was designed by SOM in collaboration with architects Mario Lanata and Andrea Messina and completed in 1992.

It owes the name by which it is commonly called (the official name is S. Benigno Torre Nord) to its characteristic octagonal shape, culminating in a pyramidal roof; with its 108.50 m it is considered the tallest building in Genoa, narrowly surpassing the historic Piacentini Tower. It is home to various municipal offices and private companies.

==== Grand Hotel Miramare of Genoa ====
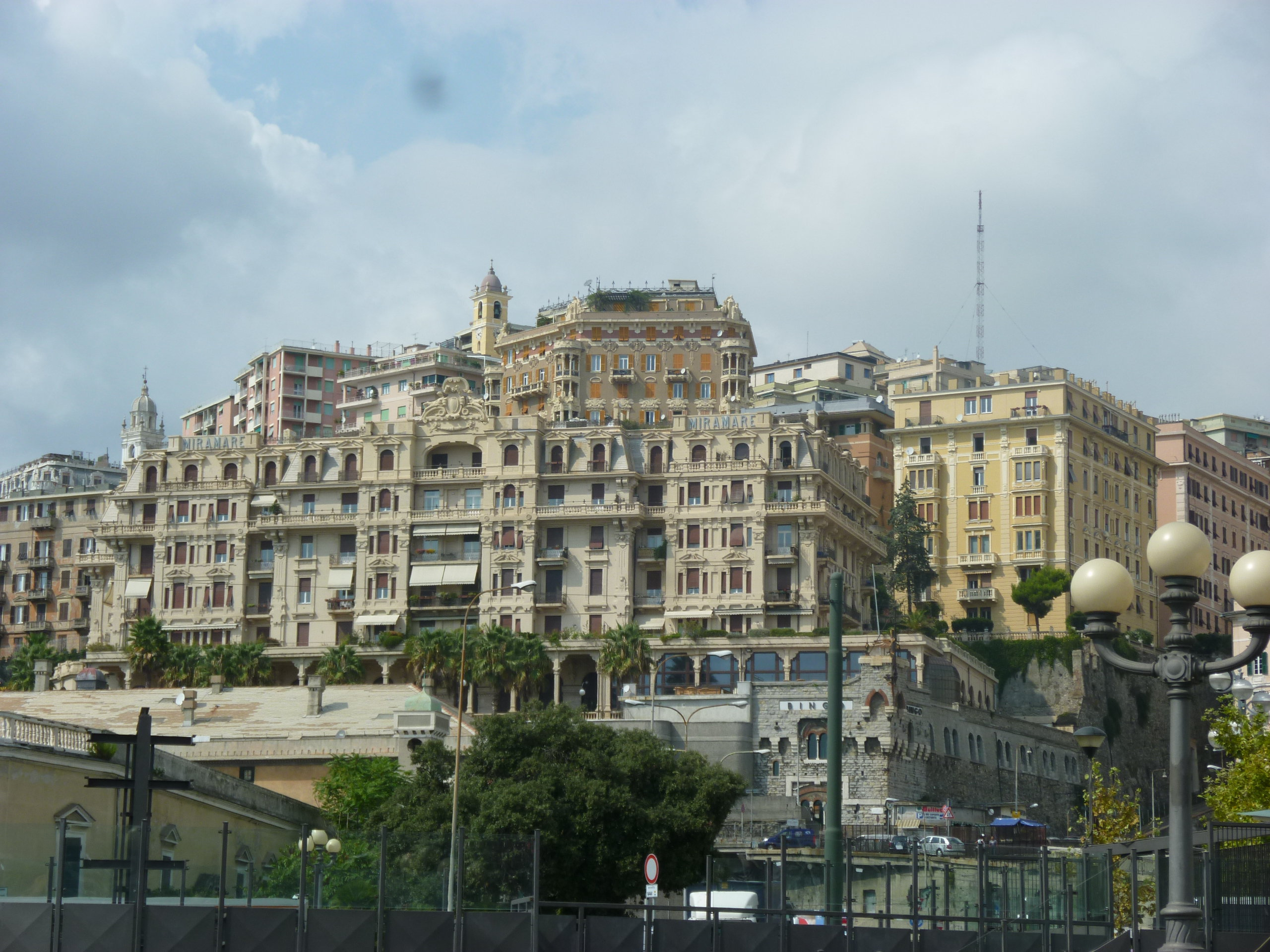
The former Hotel Miramare

The former Hotel Miramare, located on the hill above the Prince's Palace, was built between 1906 and 1908 in eclectic style, designed by Florentine architect Gino Coppedè and engineer Giuseppe Perasso. Between the 1910s and World War II it hosted Genoa's most distinguished visitors.

Converted after the war into a public security barracks, it later became the property of the State Railways but remained in neglect, ending up almost completely ruined by decay. It was only in the late 1990s that it was acquired by a private company that carried out its renovation and restoration, maintaining its original aesthetics and turning it into private apartments, although a bed and breakfast, a supermarket, a bank and a bingo hall also found a place there.

=== Religious architecture ===
==== Catholic parish churches ====
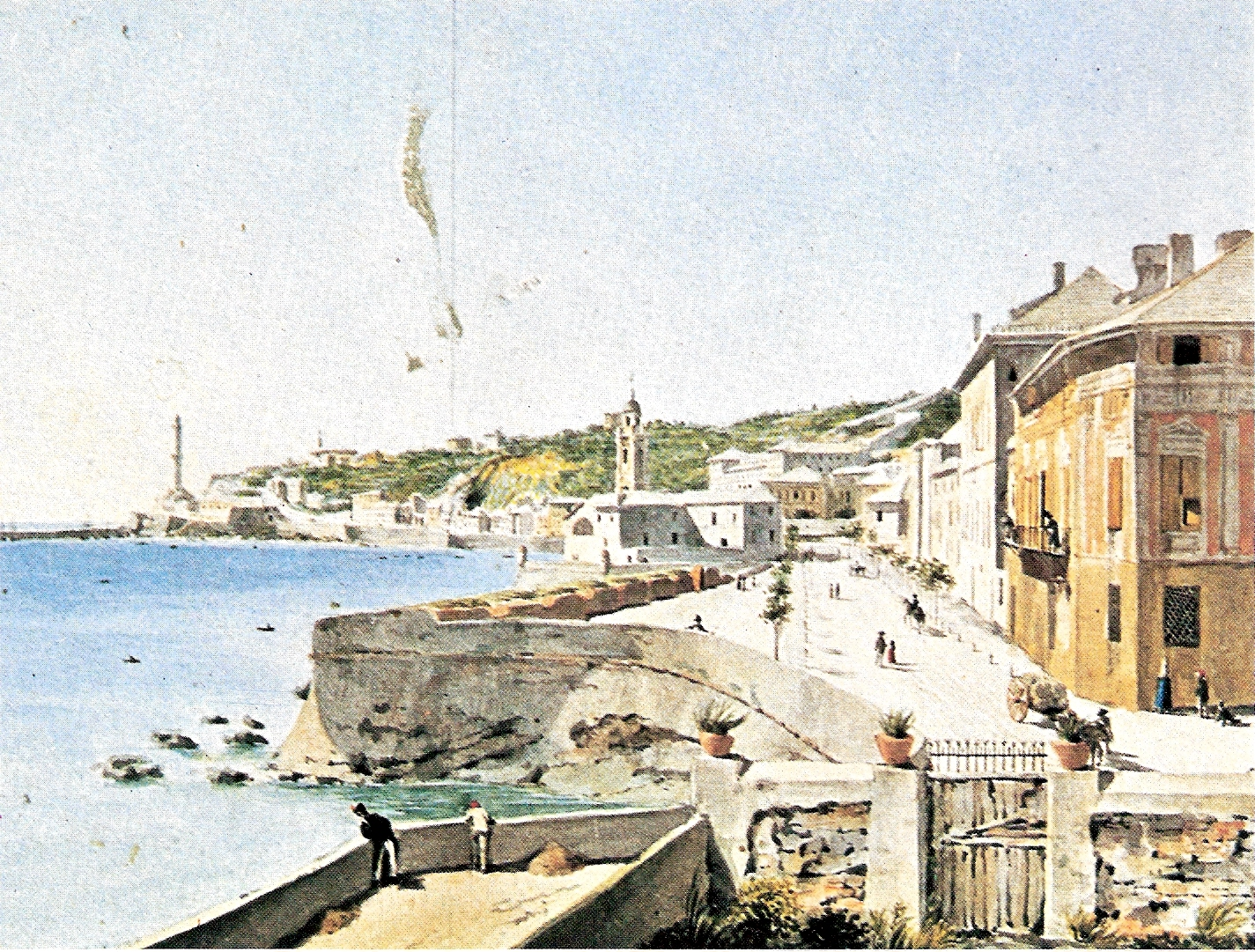
Nineteenth-century image of the neighborhood with the old church of St. Theodore in the center in a painting by Luigi Garibbo

There are six parish Catholic churches in the former “San Teodoro” district, which are part of the vicariate of the same name of the Archdiocese of Genoa; four of these have ancient origins (S. Teodoro, although rebuilt in the 19th century on a different site from the original, S. Rocco, S. Benedetto al Porto and S. Maria di Granarolo) while those of S. Marcellino and S. Maria della Vittoria were built in the 20th century as a result of urban expansion.

===== Church of S. Teodoro =====
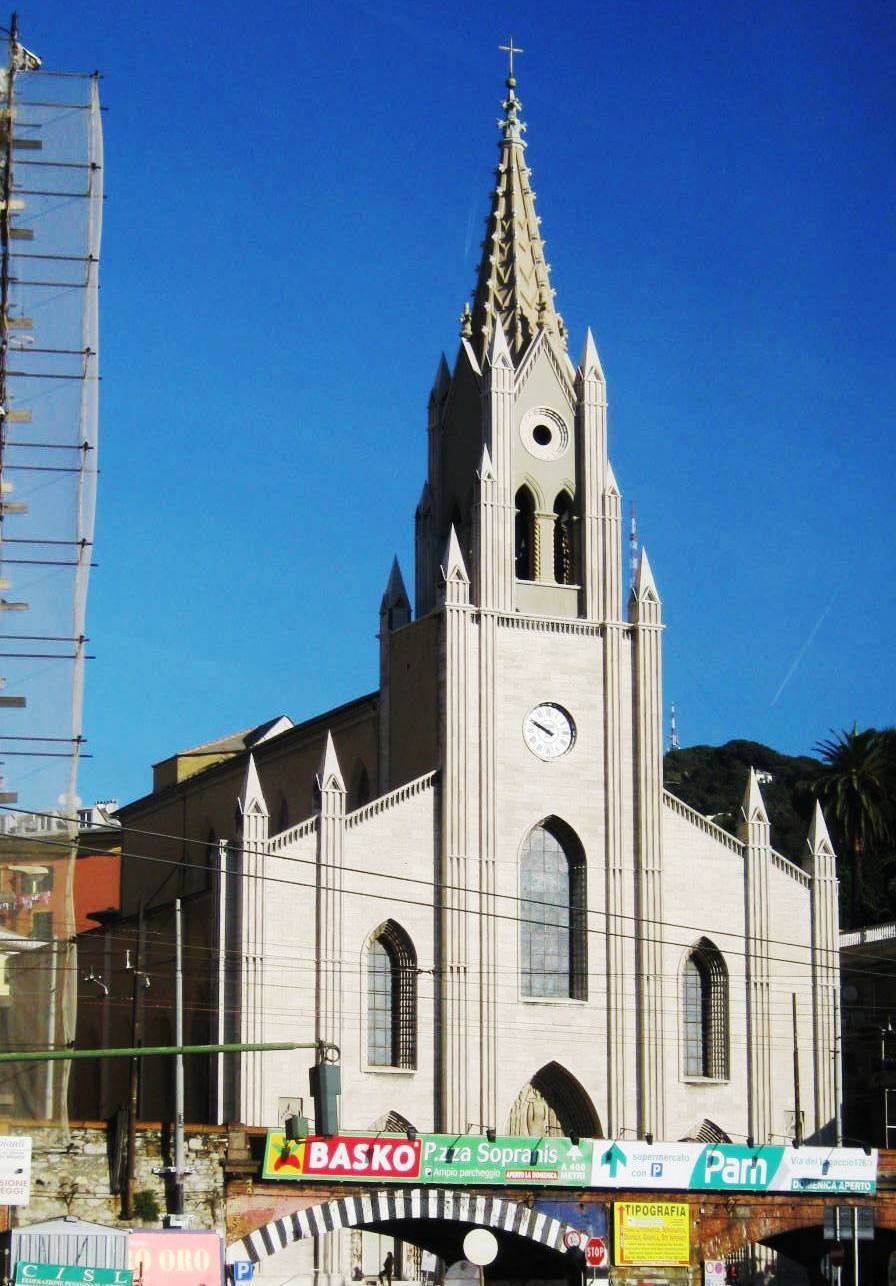
The church of S. Teodoro

- The old church. The old Romanesque church named after St. Theodore and the Savior, one of the oldest in Genoa, which stood near the square of the same name where it is now Via B. Buozzi, was first mentioned in a 10th-century document; consecrated on July 20, 1100, it was officiated by the Canons of Mortara until 1458, when it passed to the Canons Regular of the Lateran, who still rule the parish today. Some patrician families financed the construction of the interior decorations and the two chapels dedicated to St. Sebastian and the Holy Virgin. In 1481 Pope Sixtus IV elevated it to the rank of abbey. In 1596 the church was severely damaged by a sea storm. Due to the Napoleonic suppression laws in 1797, the Laterans had to abandon the church and were only able to return in 1825; on this occasion, the Napoleonic government had many works of art transferred to France, including Filippino Lippi's painting depicting the “Martyrdom of St. Sebastian,” which was returned years later to the city of Genoa and is currently kept in the gallery of Palazzo Bianco. On October 4, 1870, the church was demolished for the construction of the new “General Warehouses” in the port.
- The new church. The present church was built between 1871 and 1876 at the beginning of Via Venezia. The building, in neo-gothic style, was designed by Palermo architect Vittore Garofalo and consecrated in November 1876. During World War II the church was damaged by bombing; in 1963, the façade was redone to a design by Angelo Sibilla, covering it entirely in travertine. The three-aisled church, separated by eight octagonal pillars supporting black-and-white striped arcades, with thirteen altars, is characterized by the tall pyramidal spire bell tower placed in the center of the facade. Inside are numerous works of art transferred from the old church, including two 16th-century tombs of the Lomellini family, by Antonio Della Porta and Pace Gaggini, and an altarpiece by Luca Baudo depicting St. Augustine with St. Monica and St. Ambrose. On the high altar is a wooden group from Maragliano's workshop depicting the Virgin surrounded by Angels.

===== Church of San Rocco sopra Principe =====
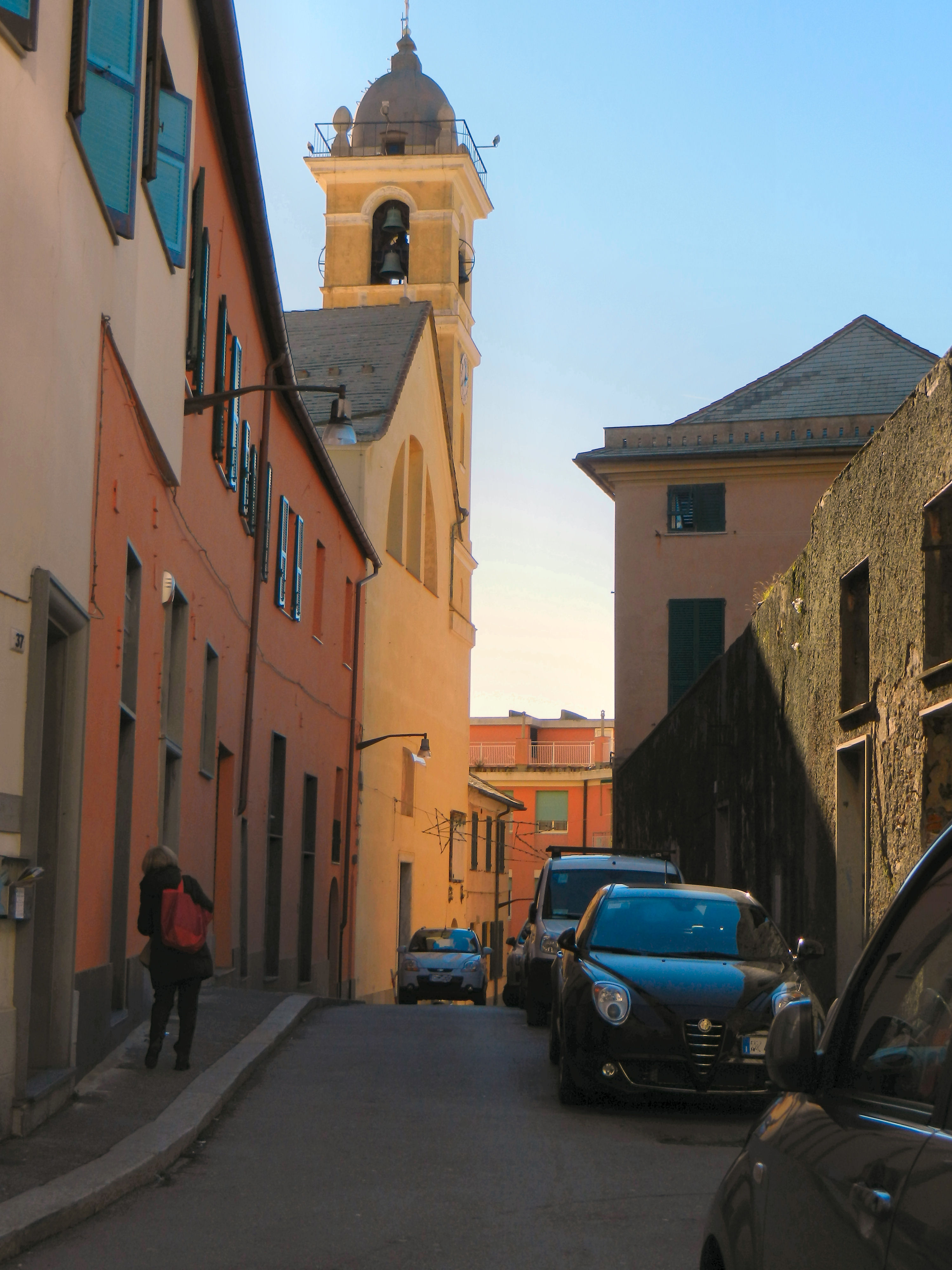
The church of San Rocco sopra Principe

The church of San Rocco sopra Principe, located on the hill resting above the Palazzo del Principe, was built in the 16th century on an earlier 14th-century chapel dedicated to St. Margaret, attached to a monastery of Augustinian nuns, first mentioned in a document of 1316. In 1510 the monastery was transferred to the Lateran Canons and in 1555 to the Apostolines, who named it after St. Roch. In the early 17th century it was completely rebuilt in Baroque style at the initiative of some patrician families who had estates in the area. After the suppression of the Apostolines, from 1660 the church was transferred to the "Clerics Regular Minor" who remained there until the suppression of religious institutes in 1797. Only in 1821 was it reopened for worship and erected as a parish by decree of Archbishop Luigi Lambruschini.

The interior, with a single nave, is decorated in stucco by the Urbino artist Marcello Sparzo (1514). The frescoes in the vault of the apse, depicting episodes from the life of St. Roch, are by Giovanni Carlone.

The church houses a marble statue of St. Roch by Honoré Pellé (17th century) and numerous paintings by Genoese artists from various churches demolished for urban planning reasons or war events; these include works by Giovanni Andrea Ansaldo (S. Luke paints the Madonna), Luciano Borzone (The Crucifix and Magdalene), Giovanni Andrea De Ferrari (Transit of St. Joseph), Domenico Fiasella (Dormition of the Virgin), G.B. Merano (Beheading of the Baptist) and Nicolò da Voltri (Madonna and Child).

===== Church of San Benedetto al Porto =====
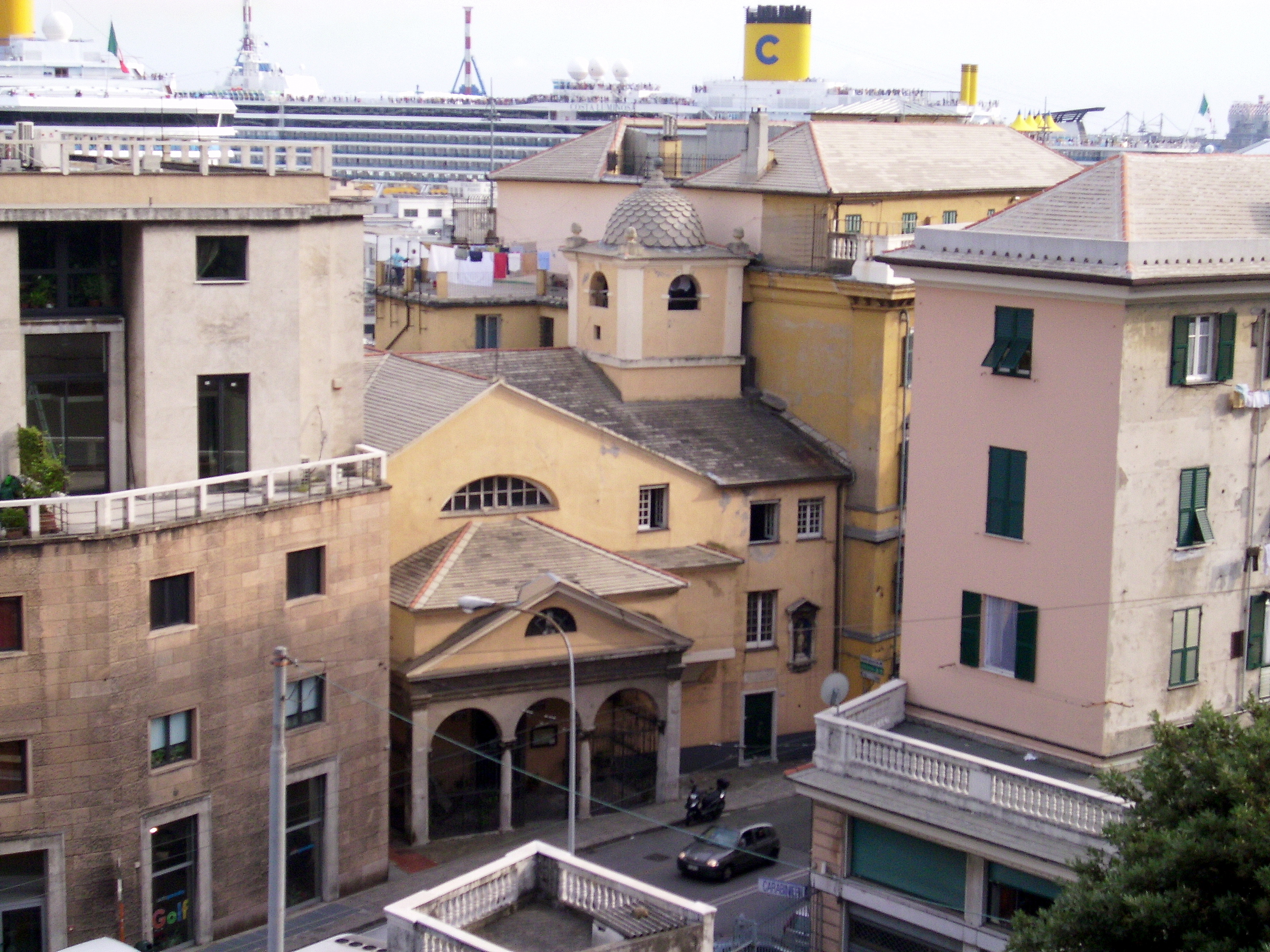
The church of San Benedetto al Porto

The church of the Holy Trinity and San Benedetto al Porto, adjacent to the Prince's Palace, was originally part of a monastery of Benedictine nuns who resided in the nearby monastery of S. Maria delle Grazie di Fassolo; the oldest document records that in 1129 Cistercian nuns took over.

Towards the end of the 16th century the complex was entrusted to the religious of the Order of the Most Holy Trinity and of the Captives, who had been called to Genoa by Zenobia del Carretto, wife of Gianandrea Doria. The latter turned the church into the family's aristocratic chapel and arranged for it to be erected as a parish (1596) with jurisdiction over all the Doria properties in the Fassolo area. The monastery and the church, to whose original title was added that of the Holy Trinity, underwent a lengthy restoration between 1593 and 1617, under the direction of Giovanni Ponzello (or, according to Alizeri, by Andrea Ceresola, known as “Vannone”).

The monastery was demolished in 1928 for the opening of Adua Street. By decree of Archbishop Pietro Boetto on July 29, 1939, the territorial jurisdiction of the parish was expanded.

Since 1975, the rectory has housed the Comunità San Benedetto al Porto, founded by Don Andrea Gallo, which takes care of people in need, with particular attention to drug addicts.

The entrance to the church is preceded by a portico, enclosed by an iron gate. The interior, with three naves despite its small size, contains valuable works of art, including the wooden statue of Our Lady of Remedy (17th century) and paintings by Domenico Cresti, known as the "Passignano" (Miracle of St. Benedict), Giovanni Andrea De Ferrari (Trinitarian Saints Adoring Our Lady of Remedy), Domenico Parodi (St. Felix of Valois and St. John of Matha), and Cesare and Alessandro Semino (Holy Trinity, Saints Roch and Mary Magdalene with Gianandrea Doria and Zenobia del Carretto, early 17th century). Above the entrance is a 16th-century organ by Lorenzo Stanga of Cremona. Four paintings, placed on either side of the high altar and depicting Saints Cecilia, Peter, Paul and King David, works by Benedetto Brandimarte of Lucca, were originally the panels of the organ.

===== Church of Santa Maria di Granarolo =====
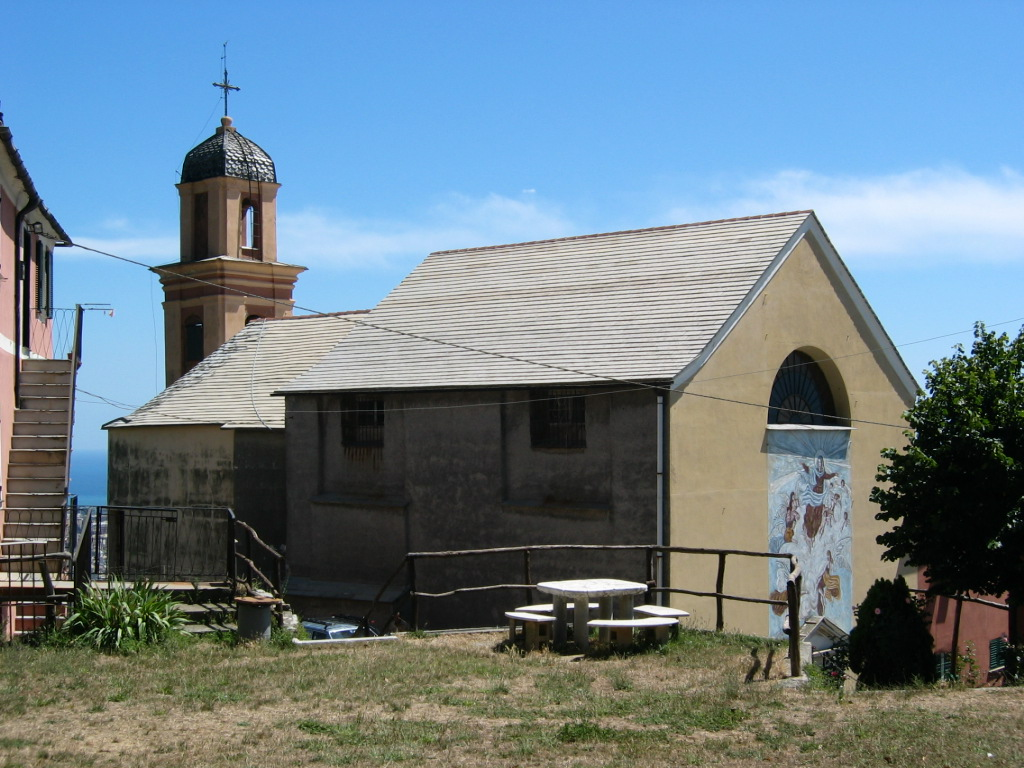
The church of Santa Maria di Granarolo

The church of Granarolo, first mentioned in a document of 1192 was built in the last decades of the 12th century and entrusted to the religious "of Mortara" who remained there until the mid-15th century, when it became the commenda of Antonio Spinola.

It was erected as a parish in 1583, but in 1821 the parish title was transferred to the church of San Rocco, of which it became a branch. Various religious orders alternated in the leadership of the church during that period. In 1928 it was again erected as a parish.

Nothing remains of the medieval church, and today it can be seen in its Baroque makeover. On the facade is a large fresco by Achille De Lorenzi (1869–1930). Inside are several paintings by Genoese painters of the 16th and 17th centuries.

===== Church of San Marcellino =====
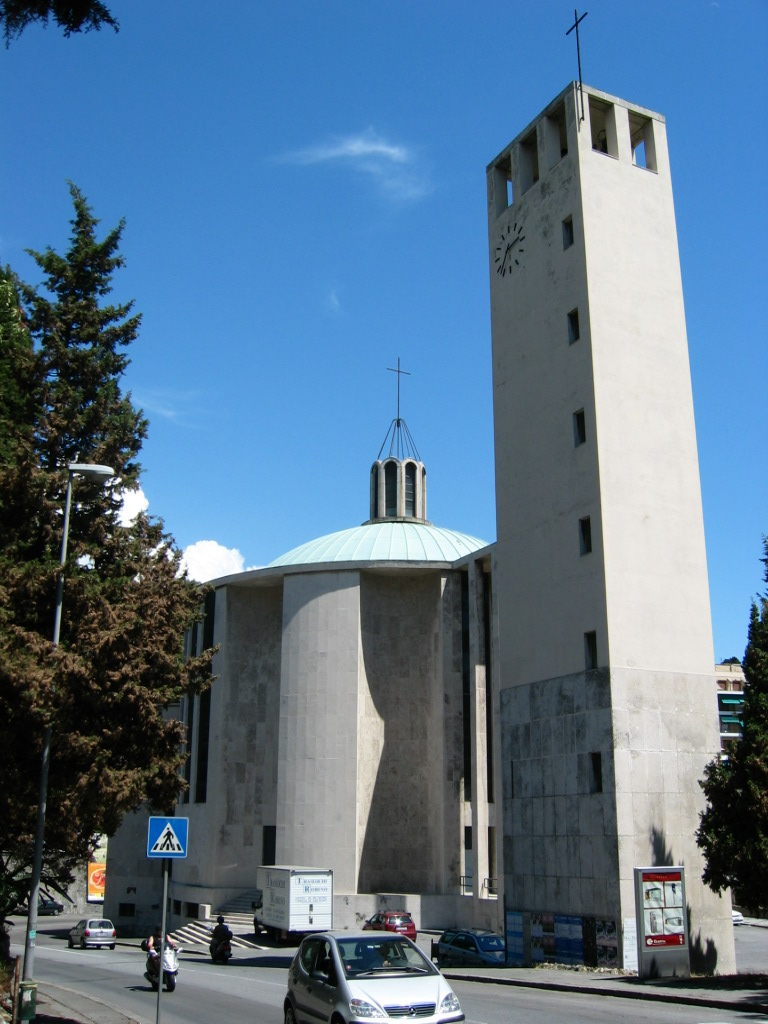
The church of San Marcellino

The church of San Marcellino was built on Via Bologna between 1934 and 1936, designed by Luigi Carlo Daneri. Cardinal Carlo Dalmazio Minoretti, who inaugurated it on January 12, 1936, ordered by decree of October 12 of the same year the transfer to it of the parish title of the ancient church of San Marcellino located in the small square of the same name near Via A. Gramsci, in the historic center of Genoa. During World War II, the church was damaged by bombing and restored with funding from parishioners.

===== Church of Santa Maria della Vittoria =====
The church of S. Maria della Vittoria was built between 1961 and 1965 in the new neighborhood that had sprung up near the old walls on top of the Hill of Angels. With the completion of the new church, inaugurated by Cardinal Giuseppe Siri on March 27, 1965, the parish established by the same archbishop on December 23, 1956, and temporarily housed in a chapel, found a permanent home.

==== Other Catholic churches ====
===== Shrine of St. Francis of Paola =====
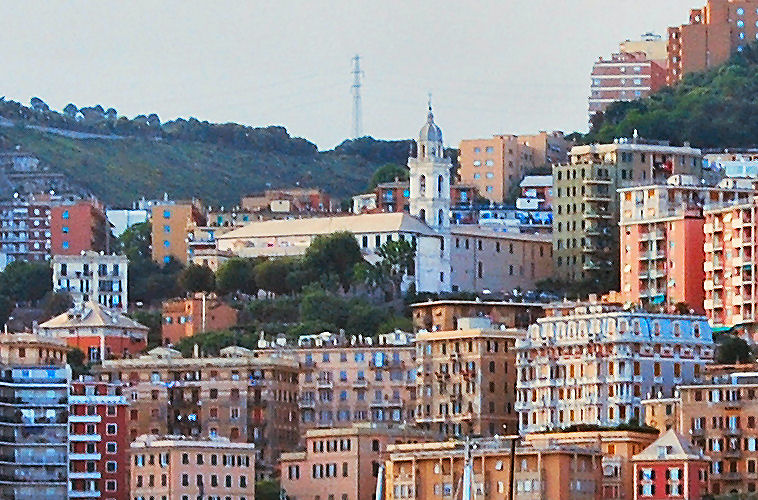
The shrine of St. Francis of Paola as seen from the Maritime Station.

Like the church of St. Rocco, the shrine named after the Calabrian saint, also called the “sanctuary of the Sailors,” stands on a hill behind Fassolo. The shrine was built in the late 15th century on land offered by the nobleman Ludovico Centurione to the Minim Fathers.

The church was completely rebuilt in its present form in the 17th century on the initiative of the noblewoman Veronica Spinola. In 1930 the shrine was elevated to a basilica by Pope Pius XI.

The complex, consisting of the church and the convent of the Friars Minor, is preceded by a large tree-lined parvis, which offers a panoramic view of the old town and the old harbor basin.

The church, which has no facade and whose exterior is completely bare, is accessed from the churchyard through an atrium in which ex-votos offered by sailors to their patron saint are collected.

The Baroque interior, with three naves surmounted by fourteen columns and eleven altars, on the other hand, is richly decorated, owing to the contributions of various Genoese noble families. In the floor are numerous tombs of Genoese personalities from various periods, including Veronica Spinola, promoter of the sanctuary's expansion and Marquess Luigia Pallavicini, renowned for Foscolo's ode.

Numerous works of art adorn the church; among them paintings by Luca Cambiaso, Cesare Corte, Valerio Castello, Orazio De Ferrari, G.B. Paggi and frescoes by Ventura Salimbeni, Lazzaro Tavarone, Giuseppe Palmieri; in the vaults are 19th-century frescoes by Giuseppe Isola.

===== Church of St. Vincent de Paul =====
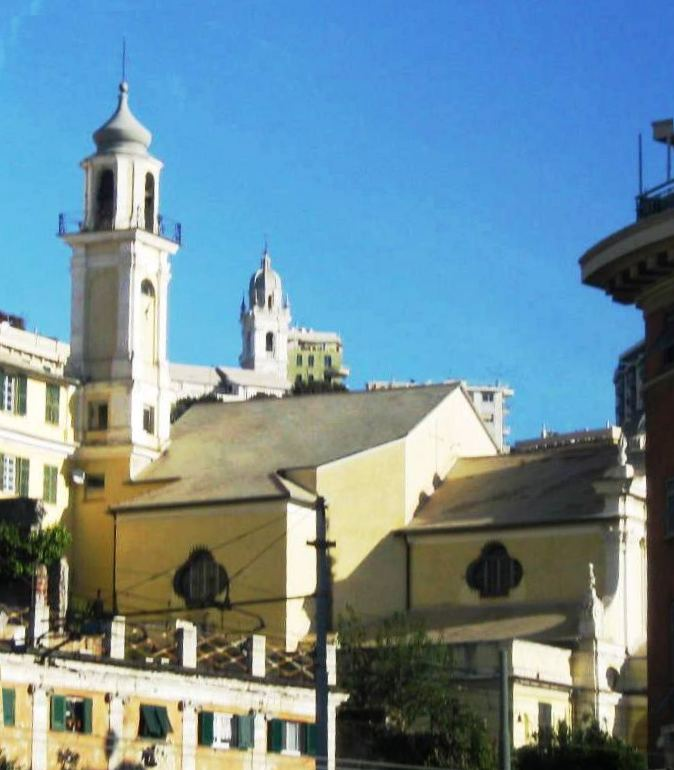
The church of St. Vincent de Paul

The church of the Conversion of St. Paul, commonly called St. Vincent de Paul's, is part of the Priests of the Mission complex, built in 1645 on a pre-existing villa of the Durazzo family at the behest of Cardinal Stefano Durazzo. The archbishop, who was particularly attached to the congregation founded twenty years earlier by Vincent de Paul, donated the villa to the Vincentian Missionaries while the founder himself sent one of his representatives, Father Stefano Blatiron, from Paris, with the task of organizing the new headquarters.

The baroque-style church contains works by Giuseppe Bozzano and paintings by Giacomo Antonio Boni. The Archbishop of Genoa Giovanni Lercari, who died in 1802, is buried there.

===== Church of Our Lady of the Angels =====
The church of Our Lady of the Angels, which stands on Salita Mura degli Angeli, near the gate of the same name, is what remains of the 15th-century Carmelite complex, demolished in Napoleonic times. Originally the building was probably the oratory attached to the large convent complex. It has a simple gabled facade with exposed brick and a one-room interior.

===== Oratory of Our Lady of the Rosary =====
Along Salita S. Francesco da Paola is the Oratory of the Rosary, built in the neoclassical style between 1824 and 1826 to a design by Carlo Barabino; this small temple with a circular plan, surmounted by a large dome, was intended to replace the old one, which stood near the old church of S. Teodoro, and was later demolished for the construction of the railway line.

In the new construction, marble from the old oratory and columns from the demolished church of St. Francis in Castelletto were used.

==== Religious buildings of other denominations ====
In a small building at the intersection of Via Buozzi, Via S. Benedetto and Via di Fassolo until the last decades of the twentieth century was the Sailors' Rest, with an adjoining chapel, in which the local Protestant churches welcomed and assisted the many faithful sailors who landed in the port of Genoa. The large inscriptions, “Sailors‘ Chapel and Reading Room,” on the main facade of the building and “Sailors’ Rest” on the side facing St. Benedict Street are still clearly visible.

=== Military architecture ===
==== Seventeenth-century walls and gates ====
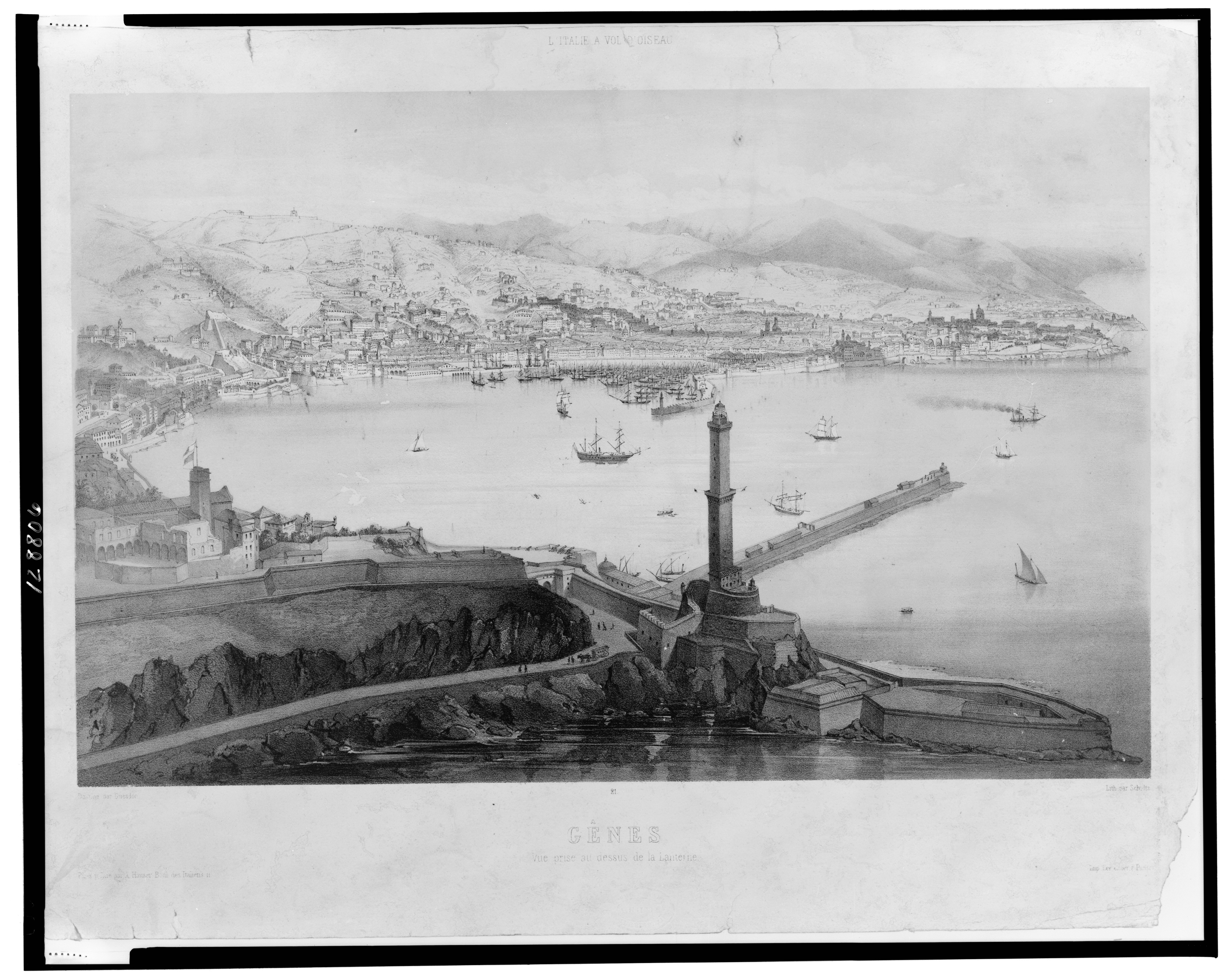
The hill of S. Benigno (seen from the west) in the mid-19th century in a lithograph by Alfred Guesdon (1808-1876). The image shows the Lighthouse, the seventeenth-century walls with the gate of the Lighthouse, and the ancient abbey of S. Benigno, now in ruins

The western boundary of the San Teodoro neighborhood was bordered (and in part still is today) by a section of the seventeenth-century "New Walls," which along their development took on different names. The wall began at the promontory of Capo di Faro, where in the walls known as "della Lanterna" opened the monumental "Porta della Lanterna," the main access from the west to the city, demolished in 1877, despite a popular petition requesting that it be preserved, and replaced by another architecturally more modest yet more suitable for the growing traffic, designed by Agostino Chiodo. This gate in 1930 was relocated to the foot of the Lighthouse, in a different place from the original one. Going up the rocky hill of St. Benigno, they passed near the ancient abbey, taking the name "Walls of St. Benigno": this section has completely disappeared due to the leveling of the hill. The outline of the walls continued along the ridge under the name "Mura degli Angeli," from where, upstream of the steep escarpment created by the earthworks, the section that still exists today begins. The "Walls of the Angels" border the upper part of Via San Bartolomeo del Fossato, which runs up the hill from Sampierdarena. In this section opens the Gate of the Angels, which was named after the church of N.S. degli Angeli, demolished in 1810. Through this gateway, now in a state of disrepair, passes the Salita degli Angeli, which climbs up from Piazza Dinegro and was once an important route into the city for those coming from the Polcevera Valley. The gate is overlooked by the ruins of the 19th-century “Batteria Angeli.” From there the wall continues under the name "Mura di Porta Murata," so-called because at the time of their construction a gate had been built there, to which the Salita degli Angeli originally led. Since to reach this gate the original route was lengthened, also forcing an additional climb to then descend again, over the protests of the inhabitants the gate was closed, thus leading to the Porta degli Angeli (Gate of the Angels) being inaugurated. After passing Fort Tenaglia, outside the city walls, one continues on the “Walls of Montemoro” and finally on the “Walls of Granarolo,” the last section in the territory of S. Teodoro. In the "Walls of Granarolo" the gate of the same name once stood, through which passed the direct route to the upper Polcevera Valley.

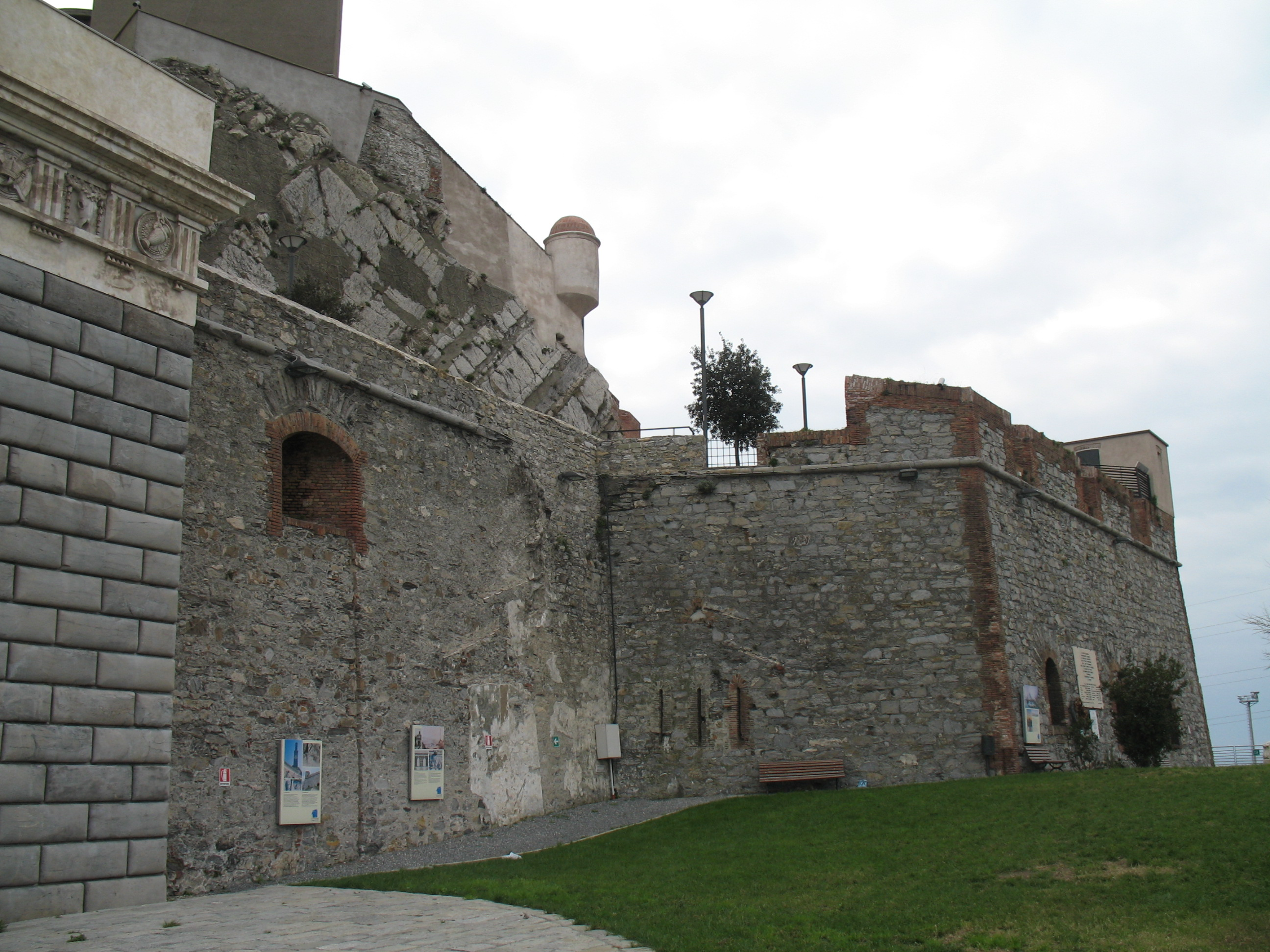
The remaining section of the "Walls of the Lighthouse"

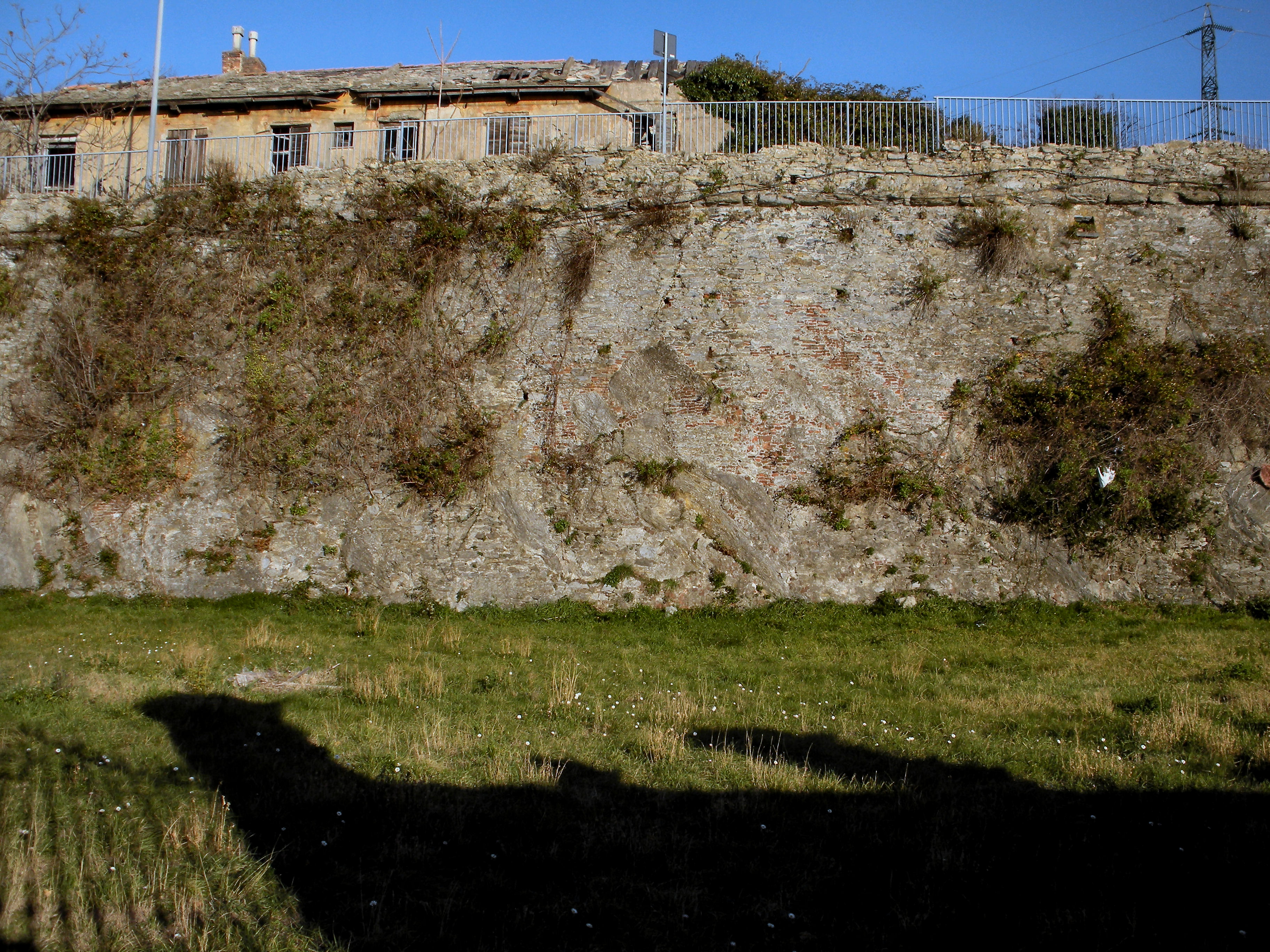
The "Walls of the Walled Gate," overlooked by the ruins of the Batteria Angeli

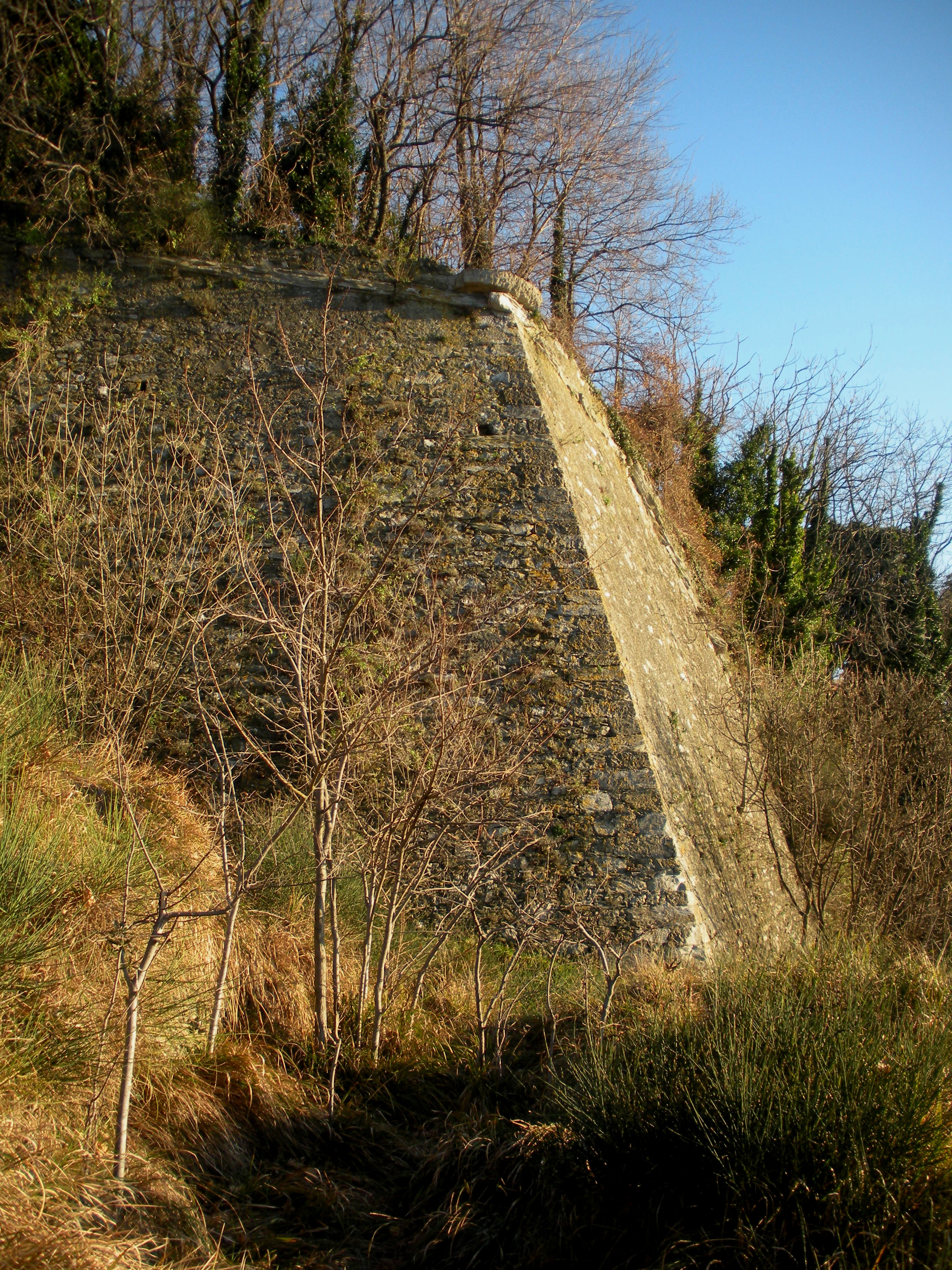
Bastion in the “Walls of Montemoro”
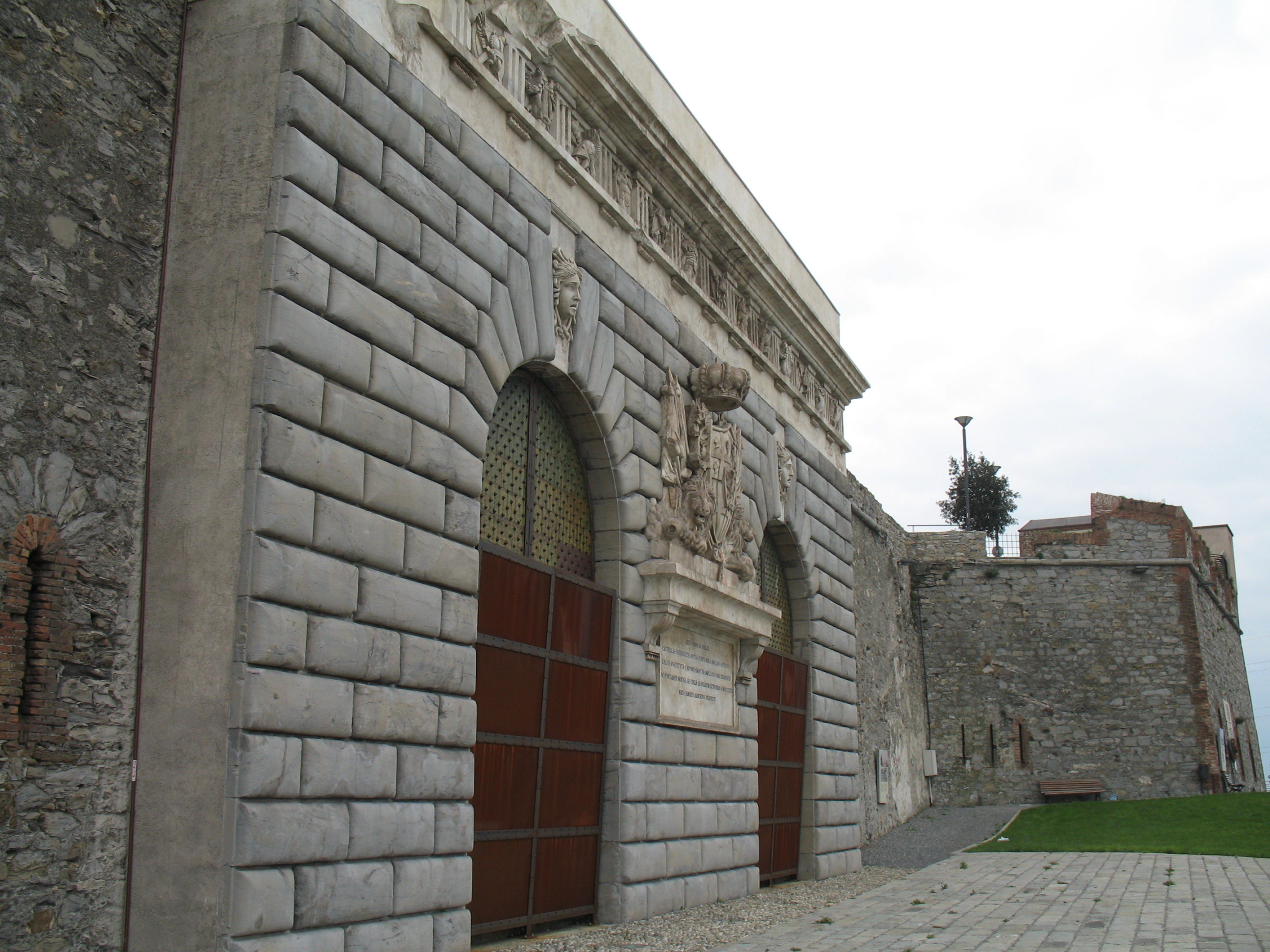
Gate of the Lighthouse

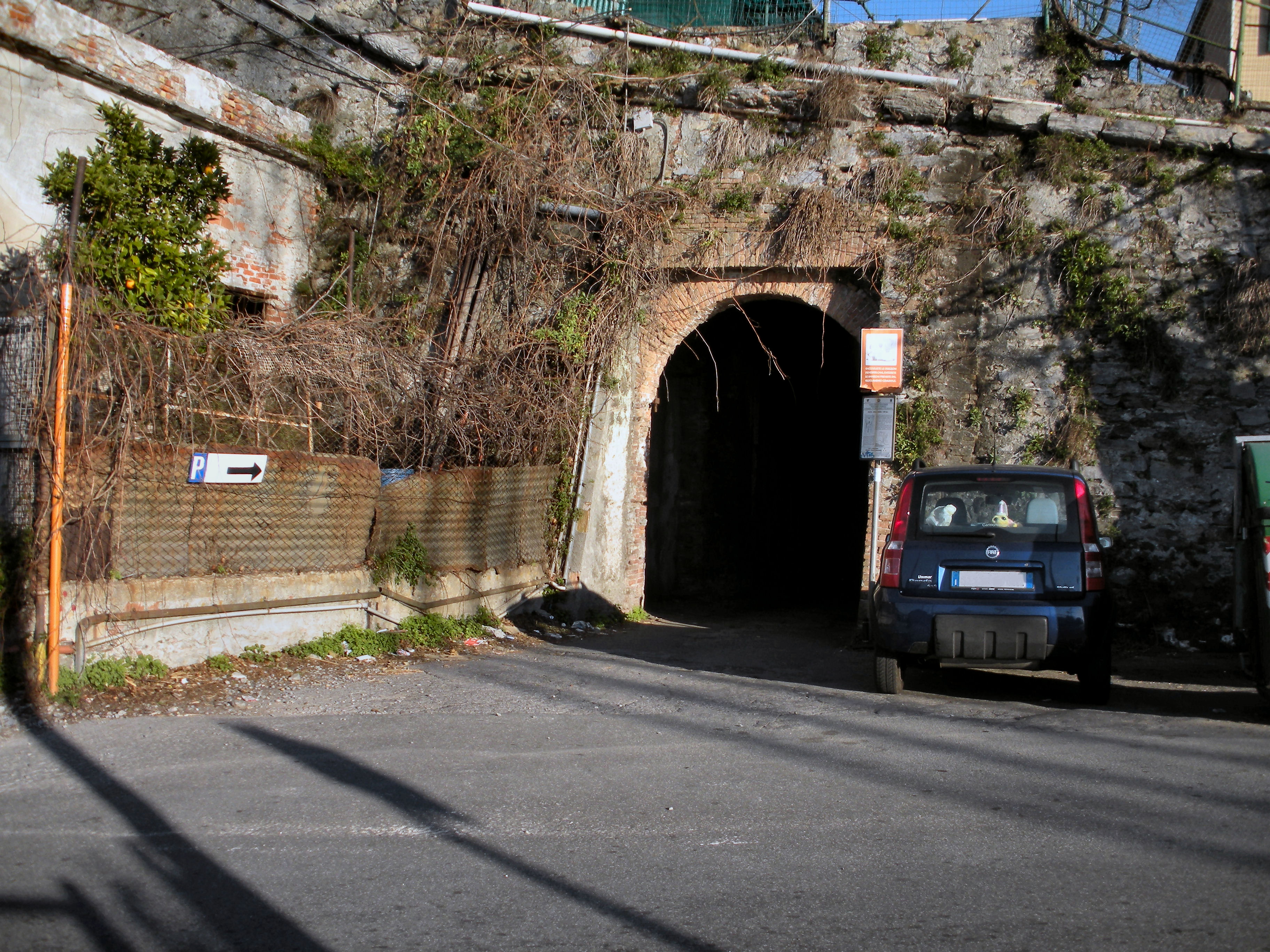
Gate of the Angels

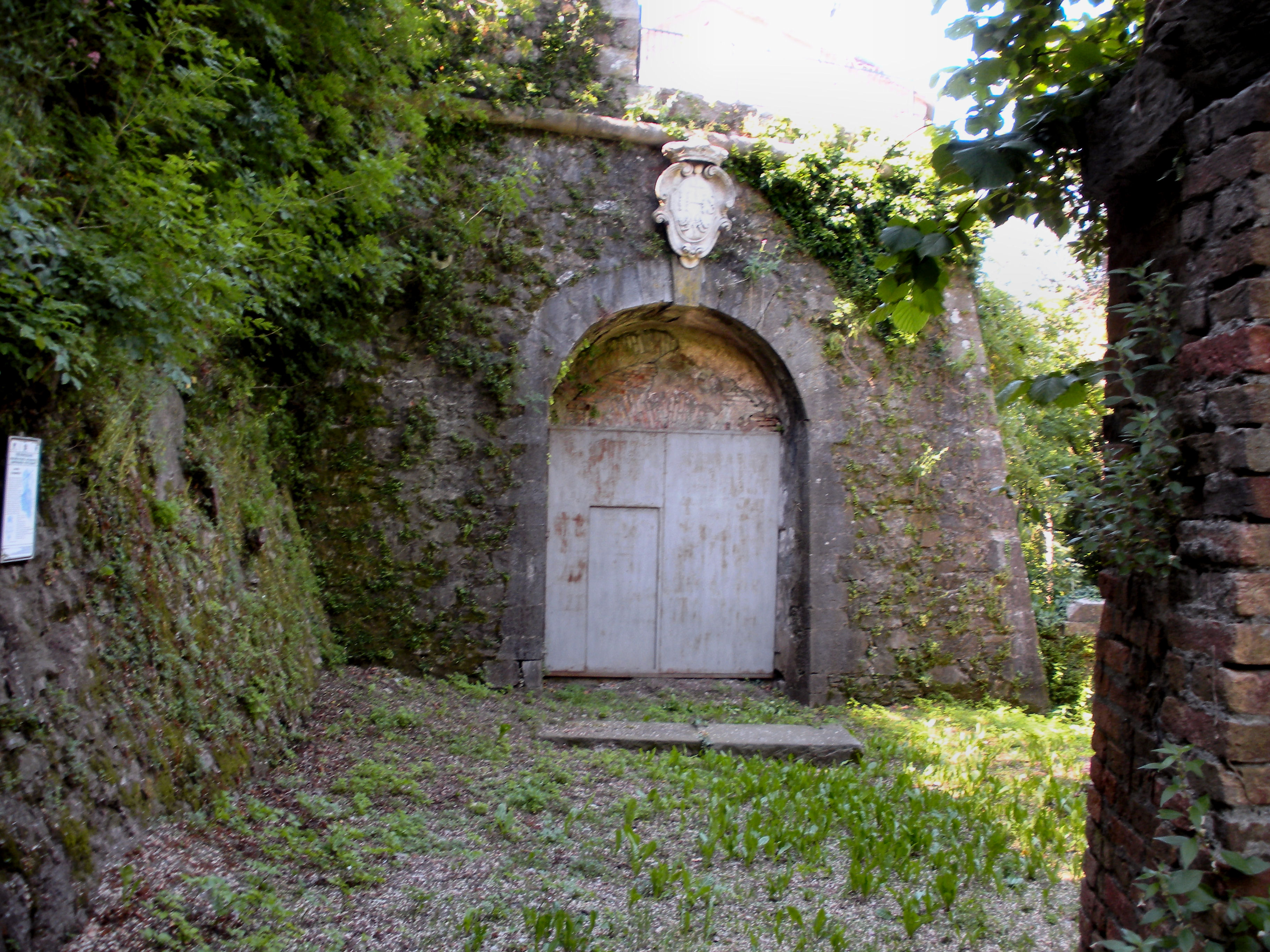
Gate of Granarolo

==== Coastal batteries ====
Around the 1880s the Ministry of War, at a time of tension between Italy and France, decided to strengthen the defenses of the sea front, considered the weak point of the Genoese stronghold, by arranging a series of batteries to defend the harbor, capable of forcing any enemy ships to stay away from the coast, thus reducing the effectiveness of their artillery. The new Batteries of the Angels and Granarolo were in addition to those already in place at the foot of the Lighthouse and on the hill of St. Benigno, which were upgraded.

- Batteries of the Lighthouse. To protect the Lighthouse and the harbor, since the time of the construction of the walls in the 17th century, an initial post of artillery pieces had been set up at the foot of the lighthouse, which was reinforced a century later with another battery placed almost at sea level at the end of the promontory, called the "Batteria a fior d'acqua della Lanterna." During the siege of Genoa in 1800, the fire from these batteries forced a British naval squadron to retreat. In the 1800s three more batteries were built around the Lighthouse. Today only the perimeter walls of one of them remain, on the terrace beside the lighthouse.
- San Benigno Battery. From the beginning of the nineteenth century artillery pieces had been placed on the square in front of the former St. Benigno Abbey, for harbor defense and anti-riot functions, as happened in 1849. After the new barracks were built, another large battery was placed in the square in front, facing two fronts: the eastern one was armed with six 32 GRC Ret cannons and the western one with four 24 GRC Ret cannons.

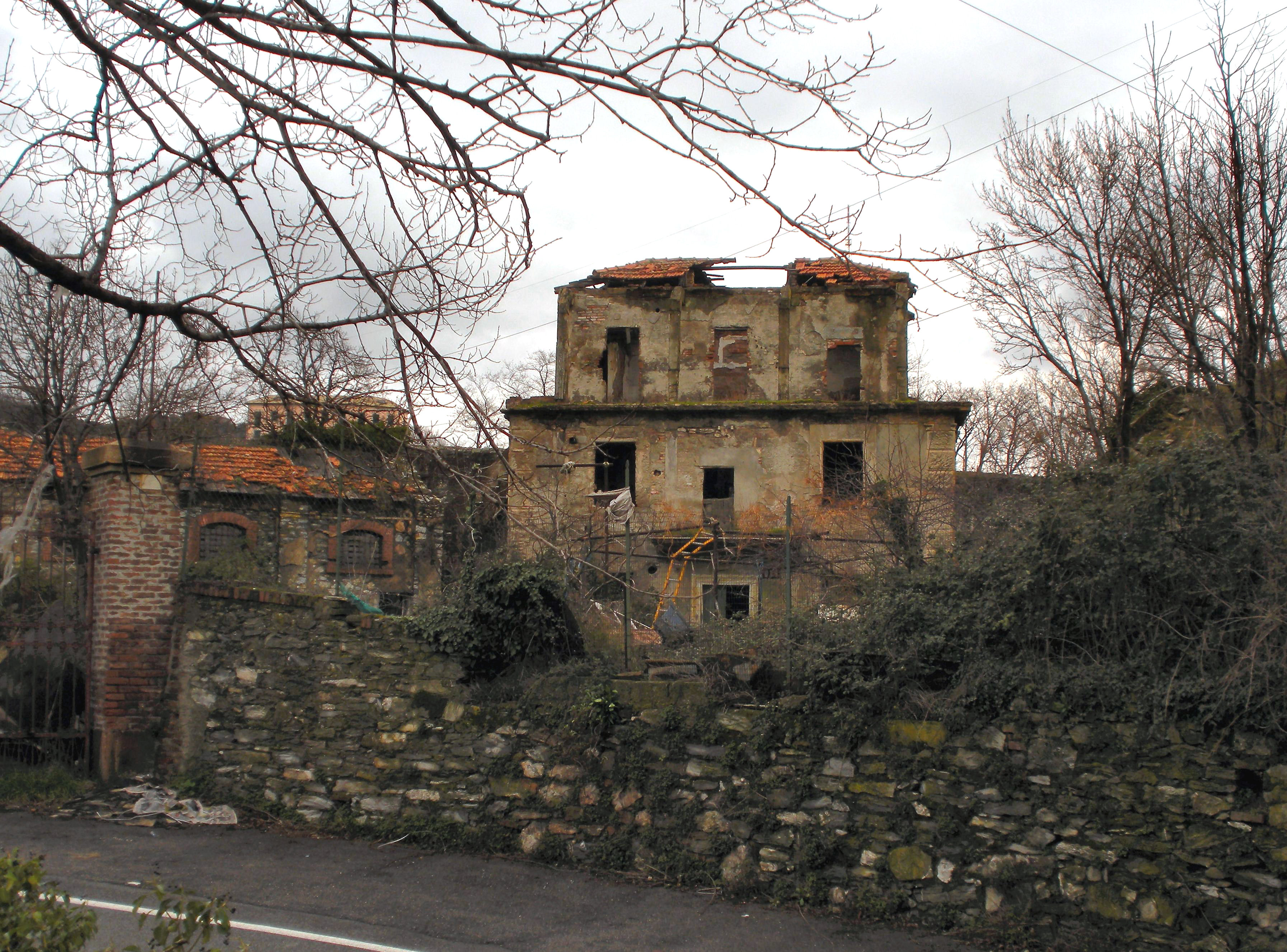
The buildings, now in ruins, that were part of the Battery of the Angels complex

- Battery of the Angels. It was built in 1889 on the Bastione Porta Angeli. The complex has its entrance on the street at the Walls of Porta Murata, and includes several buildings used as warehouses and ammunition depots. During World War II the post was used as an anti-aircraft emplacement, and two other buildings were built there to house the "4th Anti-Aircraft Unit," canteen, and quarters. Four artillery emplacements, each with two 28 GRC Ret howitzers, were set up on the embankment above the courtyard to defend the water in front of the harbor. Permanently decommissioned after the war, it was used until the 1960s as a shelter for homeless families. Today it is under private concession; the buildings are in ruins and the entire complex is in a state of disrepair.
- Granarolo Battery. Also built in 1889, it is located almost in the center of Granarolo, near the terminus of Bus No. 38. This structure consisted of an embankment on which were placed 10 24 GRC Ret howitzers aimed at the harbor and the sea ahead. The battery was short-lived: having failed to meet the requirements for which it had been built due to the change in the international political situation, it was decommissioned from the military property in 1914. From the end of World War II until the 1960s its facilities housed a number of displaced families. Today the area, which also included ammunition and explosives depots and the guardhouse barracks, is privately owned.

== Infrastructure and transportation ==
=== Port ===
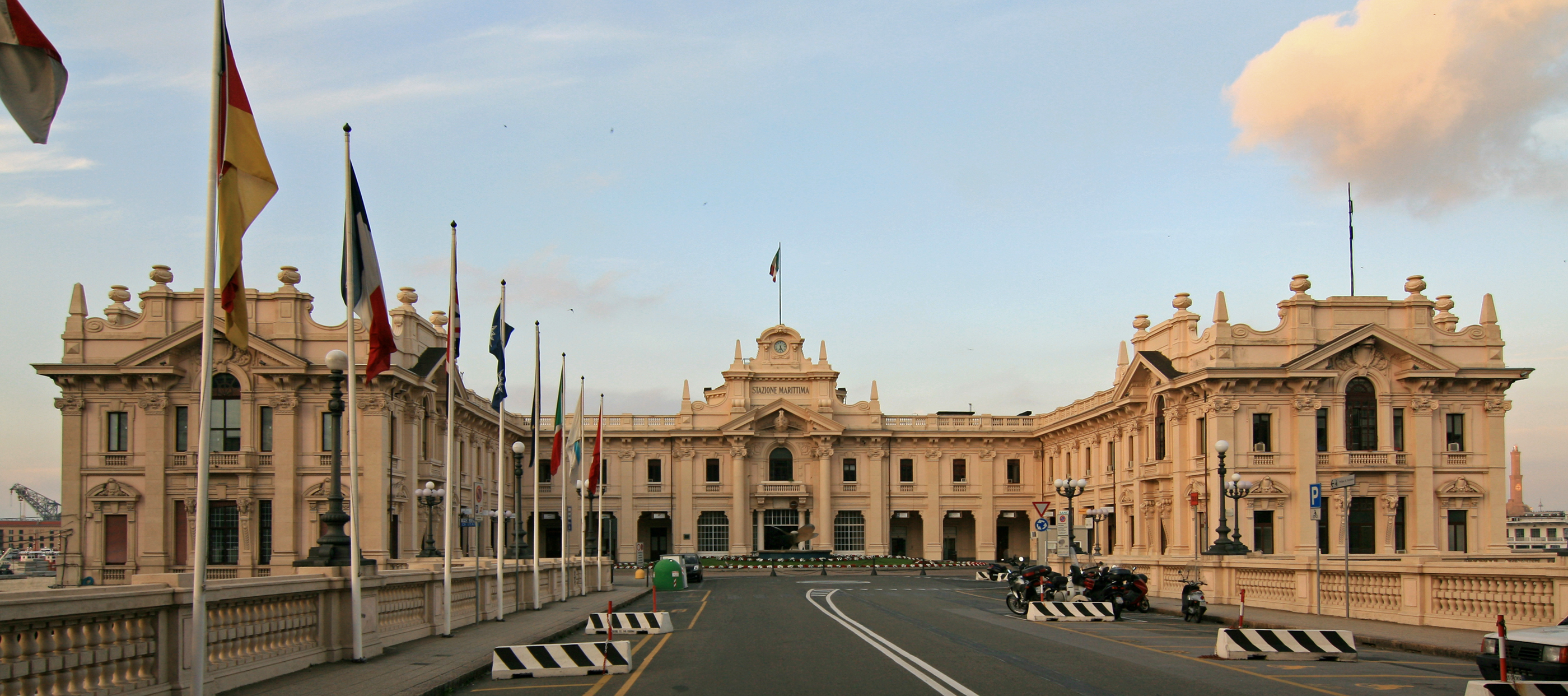
The maritime station at Ponte dei Mille

The port area in front of the neighborhood, between Principe Square and the Lighthouse, is now devoted almost exclusively to passenger traffic. Cruise ships use the Ponte dei Mille Maritime Station, once a base for boarding ocean liners of Italia Navigazione and other historic companies. The modern ferry terminal, in the western part of the old port basin, is headed by scheduled services to various locations in the Mediterranean Sea.

=== Roads ===
==== Ancient road system ====
The hamlet of Fassolo was traversed by the street of the same name, once the only access to the city for those coming from the west; this street connected Via S. Benedetto and the vanished gate of S. Tommaso, in the sixteenth-century walls (present-day Piazza Principe), with the area of S. Lazzaro (present-day Piazza Dinegro), from where one could continue to the Pass of the Lighthouse or the Salita degli Angeli. Halfway down this street is the S. Teodoro square, on which stood the old church that was demolished in 1870.

Two routes from the S. Teodoro area led inland and to the Apennine passes. With the construction of the Mura Nuove, the gates of the Angels and Granarolo were built in conjunction with these streets, which were traversed by the steep alleys of the same name, still clearly recognizable and passable. These were complemented by the route in the direction of Sampierdarena, which passed through the gate of the Lighthouse, bypassing the rocky promontory of Capo di Faro.

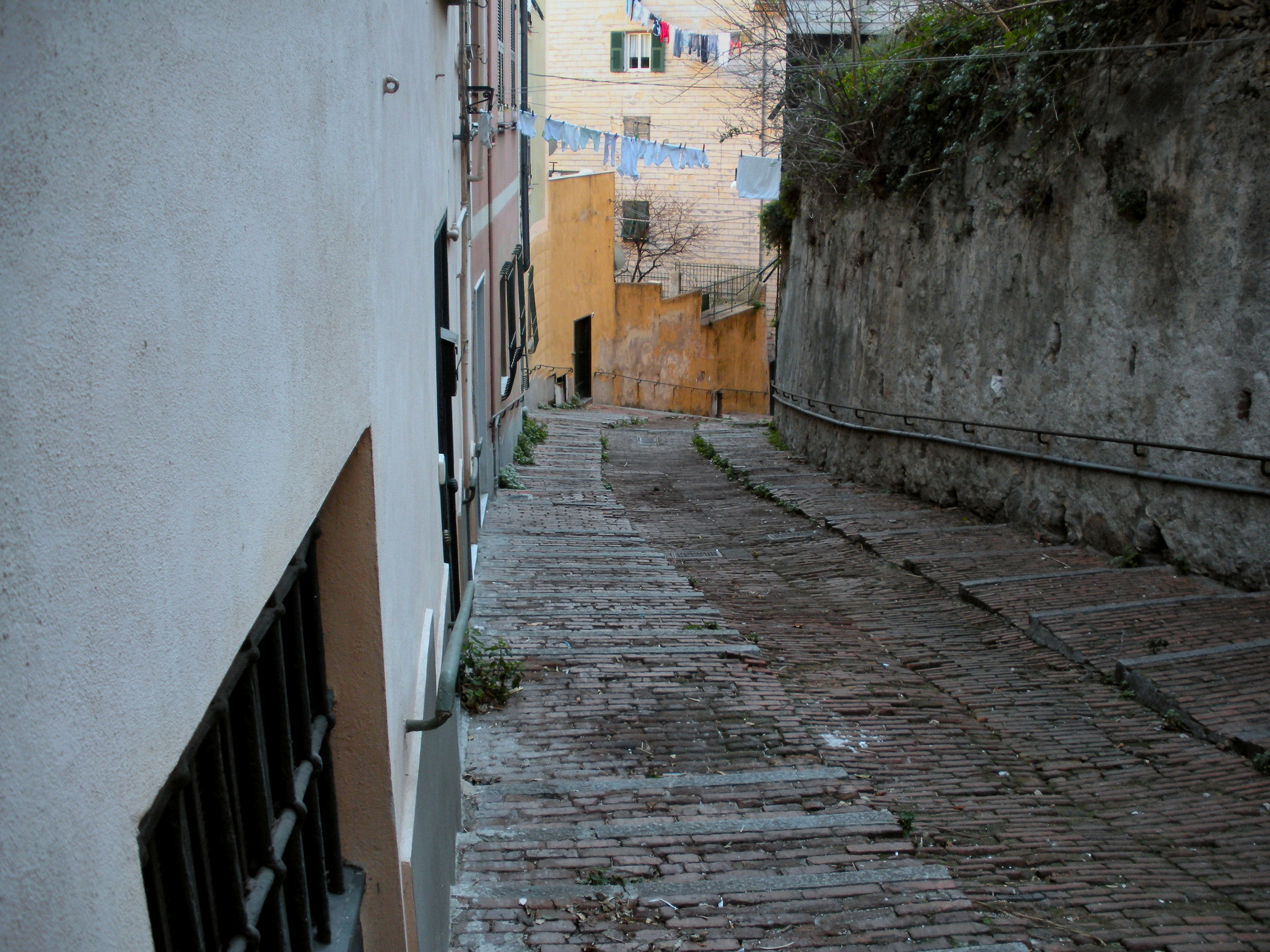
A glimpse of Salita degli Angeli

- Ascent of the Angels. It took its name from the fifteenth-century Carmelite convent of Santa Maria degli Angeli, which stood at the top of the climb and was demolished in 1810. The climb, long and steep but very wide, begins at the church of S. Teodoro and ends at the Porta degli Angeli, at 114 m above sea level. Before the construction of the seventeenth-century walls, it was the main road leading to the Polcevera Valley and the hinterland. The road out of the walls led to the Crocetta di Belvedere, from where it descended to the fords over the Polcevera at Certosa. As already mentioned, the gate was originally built at a higher elevation, raising protests from the inhabitants and forcing the authorities to move it to where it stands today. In the nineteenth century with the improvement of the road of the Lighthouse it lost its importance, although, as Casalis notes, "even if today neither armies nor princes nor travelers have to pass through it, it is not deserted for everyone, since the lovers of shortcuts prefer it to that of the lighthouse, both for entering and leaving the city."
- San Rocco Ascent - Granarolo Ascent. The climb from Piazza Principe directly up to the Granarolo Gate is one of the steepest in the city. After the construction of the Principe station, it no longer reaches the square, but starts at the side of the former Miramare hotel, where the downhill station of the Granarolo railway is also located. The descent to the church of S. Rocco is named after it and then, after crossing Bari, it continues as the "Granarolo Ascent" to the homonymous gates.

==== Modern road system ====
The main axis of the modern road system, which developed in the second half of the 19th century with the gradual urbanization of the neighborhood, from east to west consists of Via Adua, Via Bruno Buozzi and Via Milano, which run along the waterfront of the port, and connect the center of Genoa with Sampierdarena, which can also be reached through Via di Francia and Via A. Cantore.

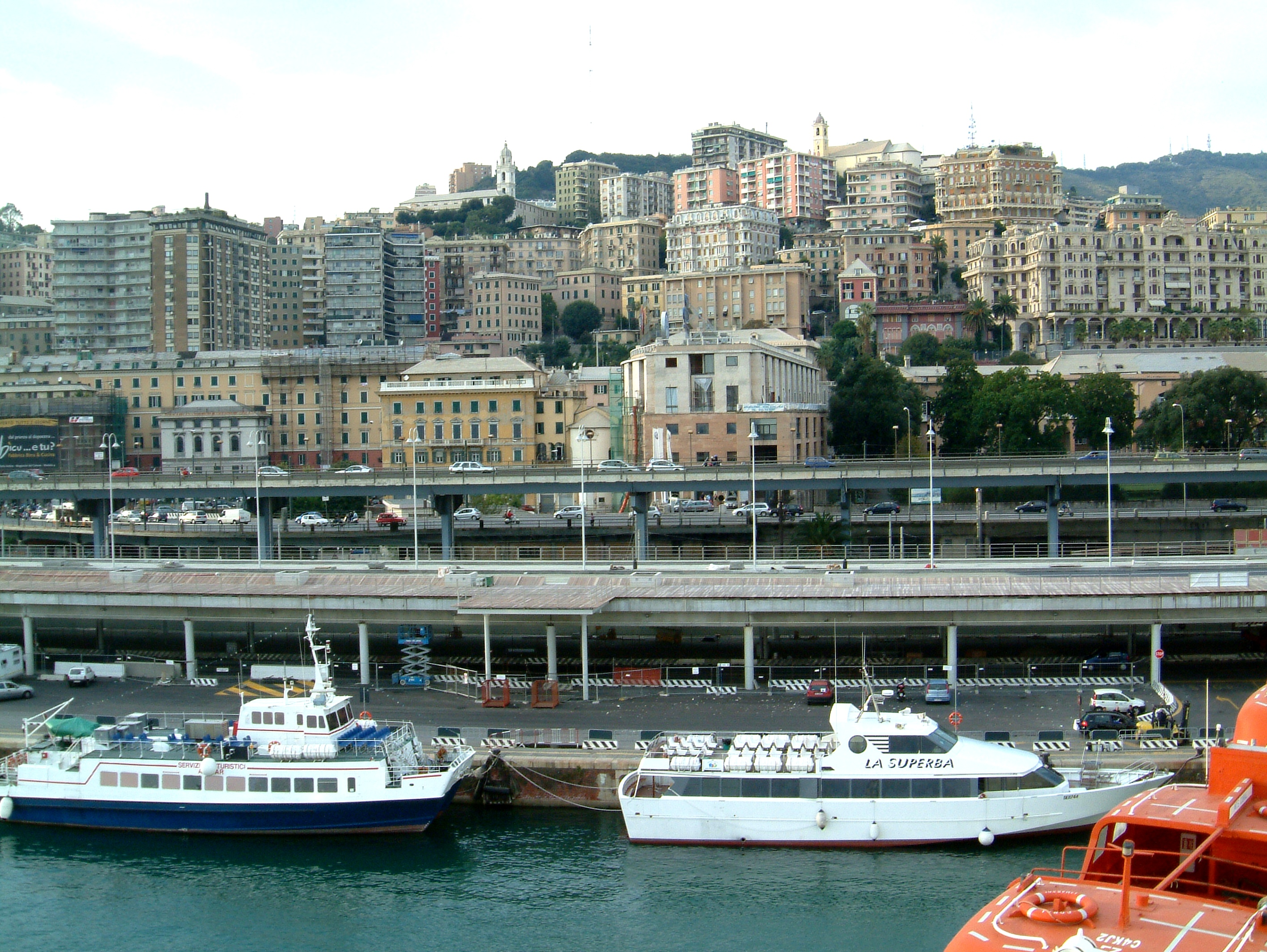
The causeway in front of the houses in Fassolo.

The hillside areas can be reached from central Piazza Dinegro via Via Venezia, Via Bologna and Via Bari, which continues into the nearby Lagaccio neighborhood, then connecting with the Oregina neighborhood road system and the "uphill ring road."

===== Elevated highway =====
The causeway, commonly known as the elevated road (named after statesman Aldo Moro), designed by Fabrizio de Miranda, was inaugurated in 1965; the road runs through the entire neighborhood skirting the harbor area, connecting the Genova Ovest highway exit (in the neighboring Sampierdarena) with the Foce neighborhood. Although there are no interchanges in the S. Teodoro area, it is nonetheless of considerable importance to the neighborhood.

=== Highways ===
The nearest freeway exit is Genova-Ovest, located in the adjacent Sampierdarena district, only 1 km from the central Dinegro Square, where the three freeways that lead to Genoa converge: the A7 (Genoa-Milan), A10 (Genoa-Ventimiglia) and A12 (Genoa-Rosignano).

=== Railways ===
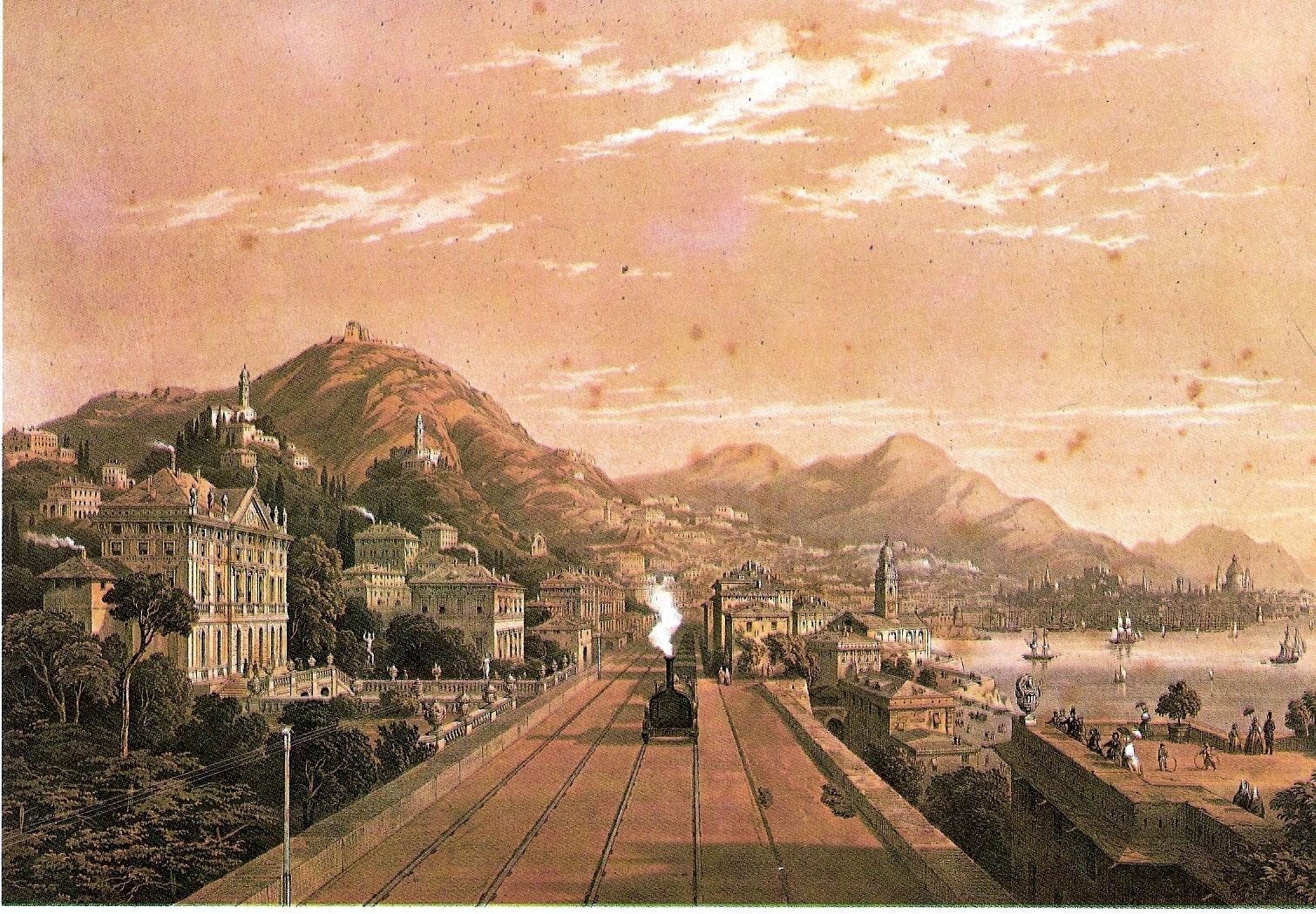
Painting depicting the railway viaduct at the time of its inauguration. Villa Rosazza can be distinguished on the left and the old church of S. Teodoro on the right.

The railway line leaving the Genoa Principe station and heading westward crosses the entire neighborhood with a long viaduct before entering the S. Lazzaro tunnel under the Hill of Angels. Genoa Principe station, less than 1 km from Piazza Dinegro, is also the station on the national network most used by the neighborhood's residents.

=== Urban transportation ===
- Subway. The neighborhood is served by the Dinegro station of the Genoa Metro, which is located in the central square of the same name, in front of Villa Rosazza. This station was opened in 1990, when the 1st lot (Brin-Dinegro) of the Genoa subway was inaugurated, built by reusing the old Certosa tramway tunnel, about 1.75 km long.

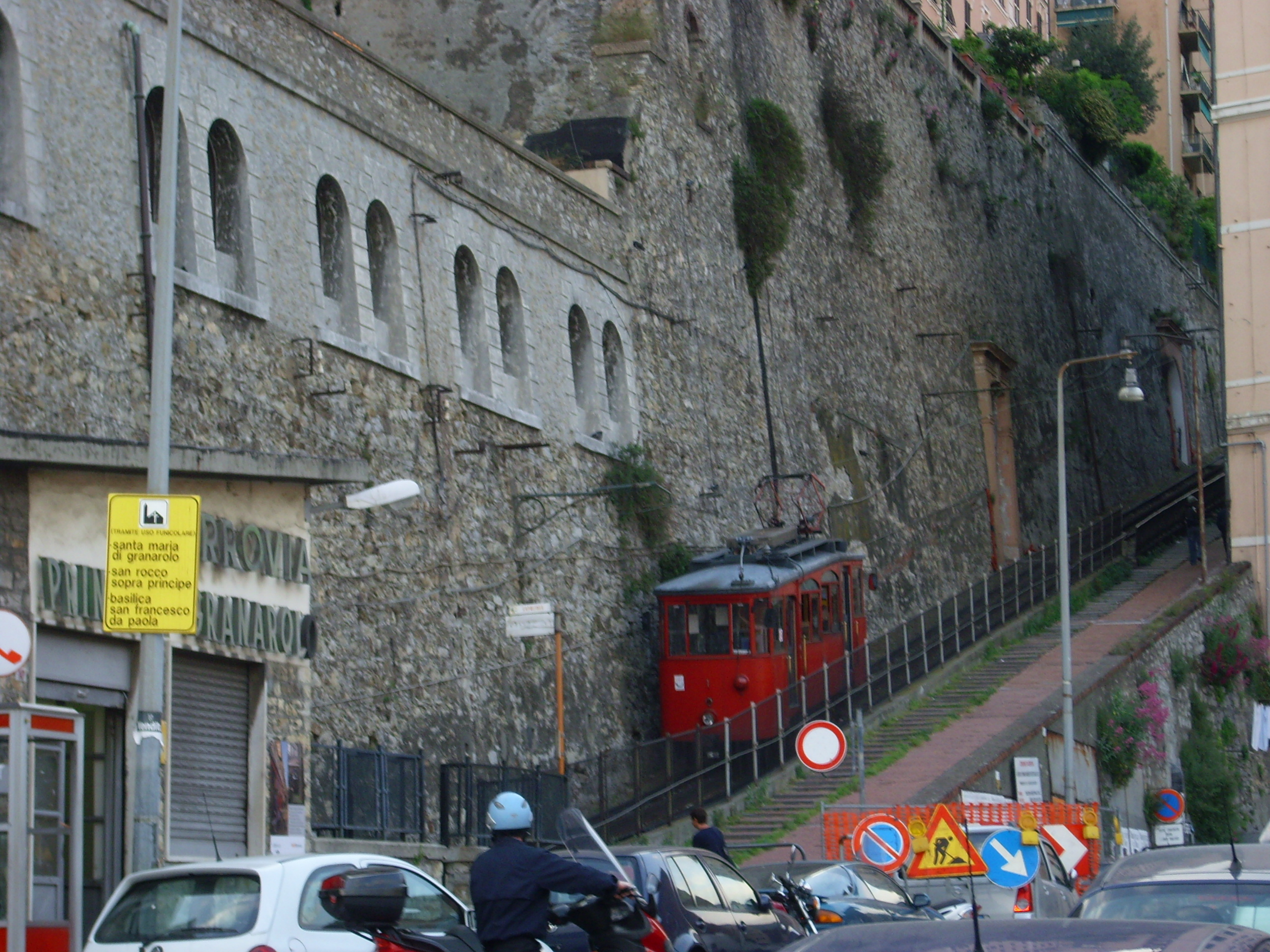
The downhill station of the Principe-Granarolo railway.

- Buses. Numerous AMT city bus lines run through the district, connecting the city center with Sampierdarena (lines 18 and trolley line 20), the west (lines 1 and 3), and the Polcevera Valley (lines 7 and 9); other lines (32, 35, 38, 340, 355) reach the hilly areas.
- Principe-Granarolo rack railway. The hilly area of Granarolo can also be reached by a rack railway, built in 1901 by a private company that wanted to improve the accessibility of the hilly area by facilitating the construction of buildings, and is now integrated into the urban transport system of the AMT. The railway has nine stops (some of which were added in 2012 after lengthy work to consolidate the track) and runs for 1130 meters with a difference in altitude of 194 meters.
- Public elevators. A public elevator has been in operation since 1963, connecting Dino Col Street with Rigola Street, in the populous Angeli area, with a height difference of 46 m.

=== Airports ===
- Genoa Cristoforo Colombo Airport - 5 km.

=== Hospitals ===
- Villa Scassi Hospital in Sampierdarena - 2 km.
- Galliera Hospital - 4 km.
- San Martino Hospital - 7 km.

== See also ==
- Sampierdarena
- Rivarolo Ligure
- Prè

== Bibliography ==
- Guida d'Italia - Liguria e Toscana a nord dell'Arno [Italy Guide - Liguria and Tuscany north of the Arno River] (in Italian). Milano: TCI. 1924.
- Guida d'Italia - Liguria [Italy Guide - Liguria] (in Italian). Milano: TCI. 1967.
- Guida d'Italia - Liguria [Italy Guide - Liguria] (in Italian). Milano: TCI. 2009.
- Caraceni Poleggi, Fiorella (1984). Genova - Guida Sagep [Genoa - Sagep Guide] (in Italian). SAGEP Editrice - Automobile Club di Genova.
- Praga, Corinna (2008). A proposito di antica viabilità genovese [About the ancient Genoese road system] (in Italian). Genova: Fratelli Frilli Editori. ISBN 978-88-7563-428-5.
- Finauri, Stefano (2007). Forti di Genova: storia, tecnica e architettura dei fortini difensivi [Forts of Genoa: history, technique and architecture of defensive forts] (in Italian). Genova: Edizioni Servizi Editoriali. ISBN 978-88-89384-27-5.
- Casalis, Goffredo (1841). Dizionario geografico, storico, statistico, commerciale degli Stati di S.M. il Re di Sardegna [Geographical, historical, statistical, and commercial dictionary of the states of H.M. the King of Sardinia] (in Italian).
