= 1672 in art =

Events from the year 1672 in art.

== Events ==
- March - Mural painter Antonio Verrio arrives in Britain, where he commences working on the decor of some of the country's great houses.
- The Rampjaar, in which the Netherlands is invaded, results in a depression in the art market.

== Paintings ==
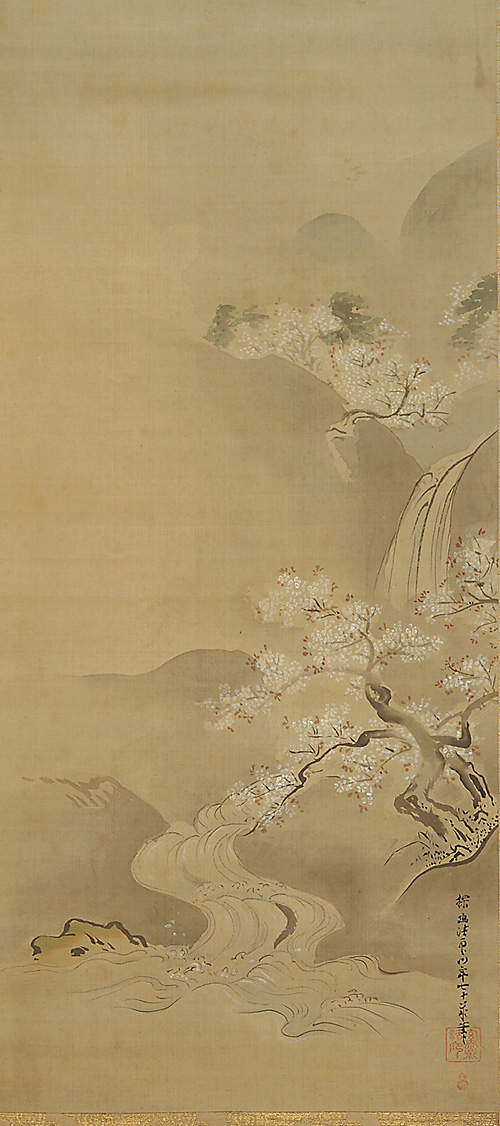
Kanō Tanyū, 春景図 (Spring Landscape), 1672

- Murillo – The Marriage Feast at Cana
- Kanō Tanyū – 春景図 (Spring Landscape)
- Willem van de Velde the Younger – Ships on a Stormy Sea
- Jan Vermeer
  - The Guitar Player
  - Lady Standing at a Virginal

== Publications ==
- Gian Pietro Bellori - Le vite de’ pittori, scultori et architetti moderni (The lives of the modern painters, sculptors, and architects)

== Births ==
- October 1 - René Frémin, French sculptor (died 1744)
- October 18 – Giuseppe Antonio Caccioli, Italian painter (died 1740)
- date unknown
  - Alberto Carlieri, Italian painter (died after 1720)
  - Francesco Costa, Italian painter of ornaments and quadratura (died 1740)
  - Pietro Nelli, Italian portrait painter (died 1730)
  - Giovanni Battista Revello, Italian painter of landscape elements for other historical painters (died 1732)
- probable – Giuseppe Laudati, Italian painter (died after 1718)

== Deaths ==
- January – Adriaen van de Velde, Dutch animal and landscape painter (born 1636)
- April 1 – Francisco de Burgos Mantilla, Spanish painter (born 1612)
- May 5 – Samuel Cooper, English miniature painter (born 1609)
- October 8 – Abraham Lambertsz van den Tempel, Dutch Golden Age painter (born 1622)
- November 4 – Lucas van Uden, Flemish Baroque painter specializing in landscapes (born 1595)
- November 16 – Esaias Boursse, Dutch painter of genre works (born 1631)
- December 30 – Hendrick Bloemaert, Dutch Golden Age painter (born 1601)
- date unknown
  - Ambrosio Martínez Bustos, Spanish Baroque painter active in Granada (born 1614)
  - Ginevra Cantofoli, Italian painter (born 1608/1618)
  - Salvi Castellucci, Italian painter active in Arezzo (born 1608)
  - Viviano Codazzi, Italian painter of landscapes or vedute (born 1606/1611)
  - Obaku Dokuryu, Japanese calligrapher and painter (born 1596)
  - Zhou Lianggong, Chinese bureaucrat, poet, essayist and art historian, patron of many important Chinese painters (born 1612)
  - Lorenzo Tinti, Italian painter and engraver (born 1626)
  - Jean Varin, French sculptor and engraver (born 1604)
  - Abraham Willemsens, Flemish painter of history and genre paintings (born 1605/1610)
