= 1720 in art =

List of years in art	(table)
- … 1710; 1711; 1712; 1713; 1714; 1715; 1716; 1717; 1718; 1719; 1720; 1721; 1722; 1723; 1724; 1725; 1726; 1727; 1728; 1729; 1730 …
- Art; Archaeology; Architecture; Literature; Music; Philosophy; Science; +...

Events from the year 1720 in art.

== Events ==
- May 2 – James Thornhill, Serjeant Painter to King George I of Great Britain, is knighted, the first native English artist to be so honoured.
- John Michael Rysbrack settles in London.
- Portraitist Rosalba Carriera moves temporarily from Venice to Paris.
- The interior decoration of Santo Sepolcro (Pisa) is restored.

== Works ==
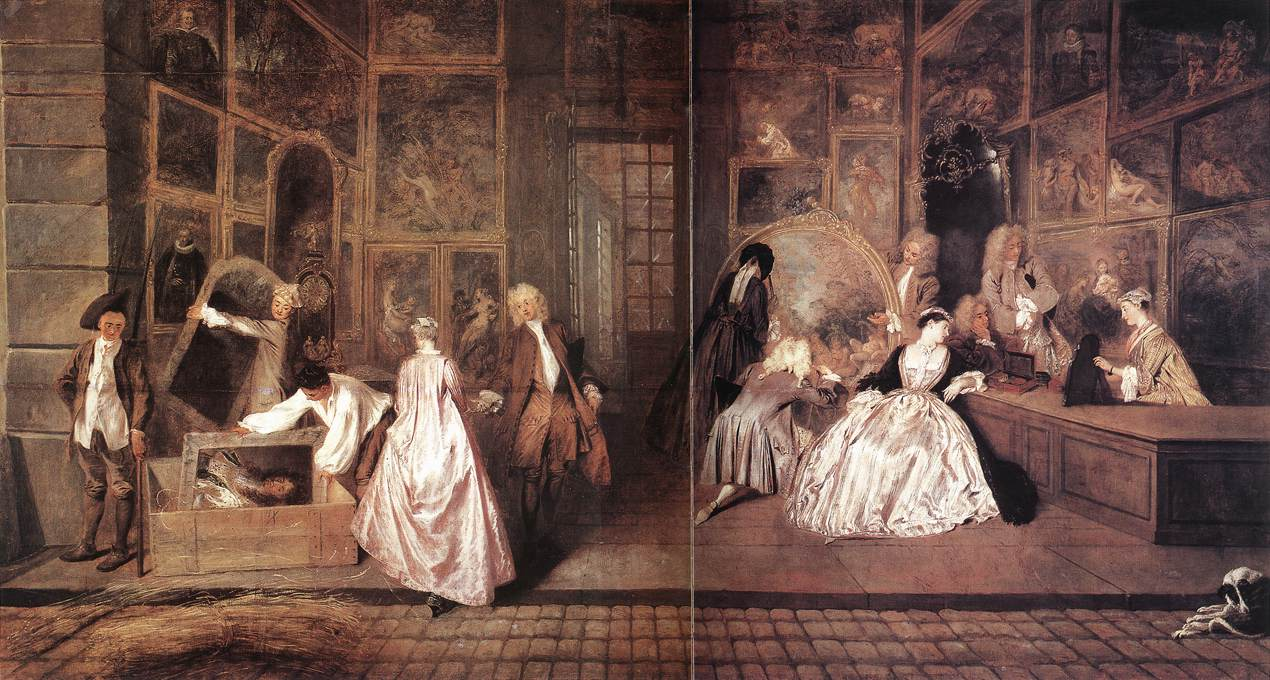
Antoine Watteau, L'Enseigne de Gersaint (1720): In one of Watteau's last paintings, the portrait of Louis XIV and his own artworks are being packed away.

- William Aikman – Portrait of the Duke of Argyll
- Rosalba Carriera – Maria Josepha of Austria
- Peter Scheemakers – Bust of John Dryden (Westminster Abbey)
- Antoine Watteau
  - The Judgement of Paris (approximate date)
  - The shop sign of Gersaint

== Births ==
- January 19 – John Boydell, engraver (died 1804)
- January 20 – Bernardo Bellotto, Italian urban landscape painter or vedutista, and printmaker in etching (died 1780)
- August 15 – Charles Norbert Roettiers, French engraver and medallist (died 1772)
- October 4 – Giovanni Battista Piranesi, Italian artist (died 1778)
- November 30 – André Soares, Portuguese sculptor and architect (died 1769)
- date unknown
  - Pierre-Edmé Babel, French engraver (died 1775)
  - John Giles Eccardt, German-born English portrait painter (died 1779)
  - Charles-Dominique-Joseph Eisen, French painter and draftsman (died 1778)
  - Edme Dumont, French sculptor (died 1775)
  - Pietro Gaspari, Italian artist, known for veduta and capriccio in etchings and paintings (died 1785)
  - Carlo Magini, Italian painter of the Baroque period (died 1806)
  - Johannes Rach, Danish painter and draughtsman (died 1783)
  - Giuseppe Sanmartino, Italian sculptor during the Rococo period (died 1793)
  - Isak Wacklin, Finnish painter (died 1758)
  - Georg Caspar von Prenner, Austrian artist (died 1766), son of Anton Joseph von Prenner, Austrian artist (1683/98?–1761)
- date probably
  - Anton Giuseppe Barbazza, Italian painter and engraver of the Baroque period (died 1771)
  - Jonas Haas, German-born Danish engraver (died 1775)

== Deaths ==
- March 6 – Pieter van Bloemen, Flemish painter (born 1657)
- June 3 – Cristoforo Munari, Italian painter specializing in still life (born 1667)
- October 10 – Antoine Coysevox, French sculptor emigrated from Spain (born 1640)
- November 19 - Hendrick van Streeck, Dutch Golden Age painter of church interiors and a sculptor (born 1659)
- date unknown
  - Giovanni Agostino Cassana, Italian painter of animals and subject pictures (born 1658)
  - Orazio Marinali, Italian sculptor, active mainly in Veneto (born 1643)
  - Tao Chi, Chinese landscape painter (born 1641)
  - Adriaen van Salm, Dutch draftsman and painter (born 1660)
- probable
  - Alberto Carlieri, Italian painter of the late-Baroque period (born 1672)
