= Prè =

Neighbourhood in Genoa, Italy

- Quartiere
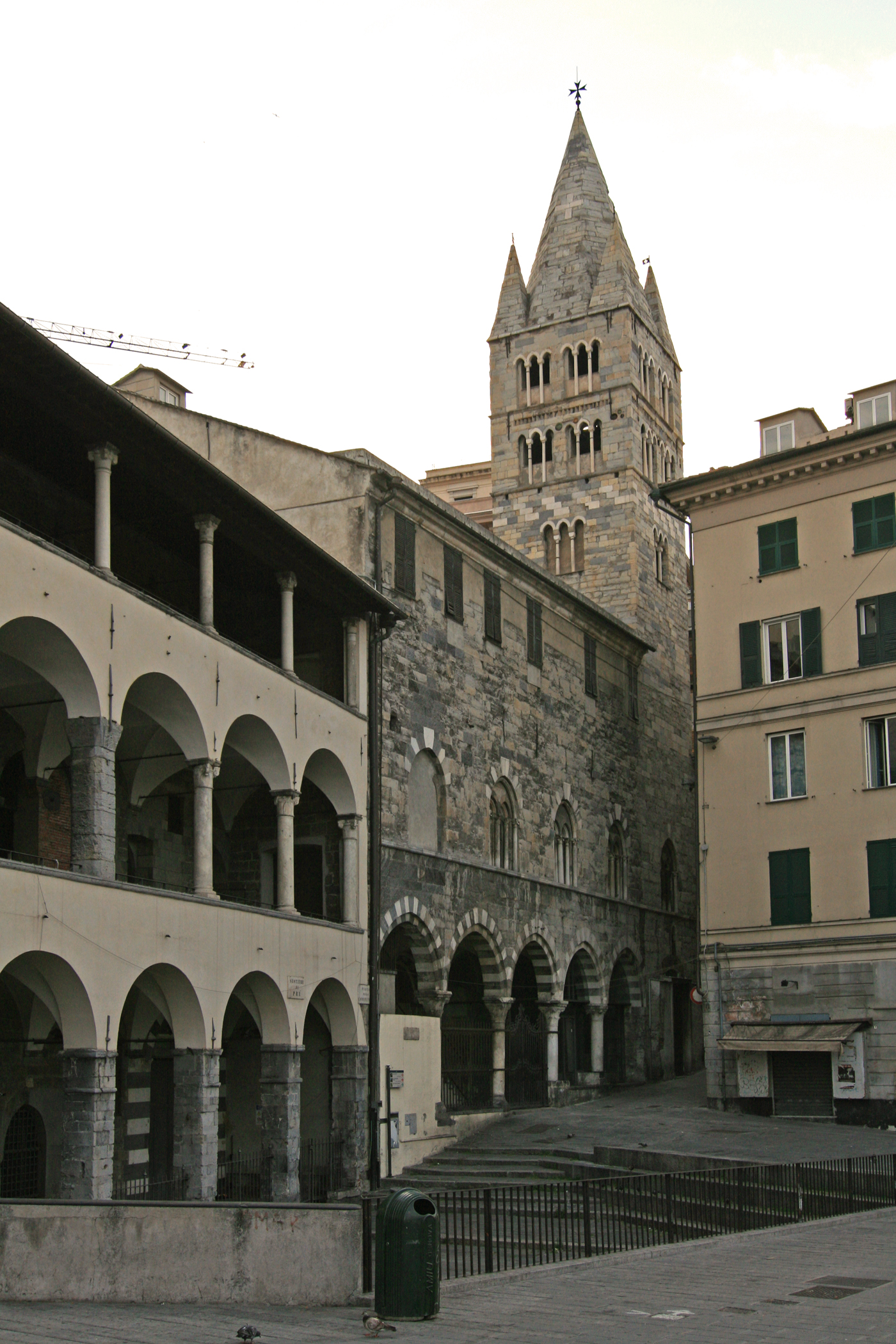
- Commandery of St. John of Pré

- Location in Italy
- Coordinates: 44°24′53″N 8°55′30″E
- Country: Italy
- Region: Liguria
- Province: Province of Genoa
- Comune: Genoa

Area
  - Total: 0.45 km^{2} (0.17 sq mi)

Population
  - Total: 7,586
- Postal codes: 16124, 16125, 16126
- Area code: 010

Prè (pron. /ˈprɛ/) is a neighbourhood in the old town of the Italian city of Genoa. It was one of the six sestieri of ancient Genoa. At present it is part of Municipio I (Centro Est) of Great Genoa.

Located close to the old harbour, it is likely the best-known neighbourhood of the old town of Genoa.

== Etymology ==
Prè takes its name from the Latin word prædia (fields), because in origin this was a rural zone. The use of this term is documented since 1131.

== Demographics ==
On 31 December 2015 there were 7,586 people living in Prè, with a population density of 16,858 people per km².

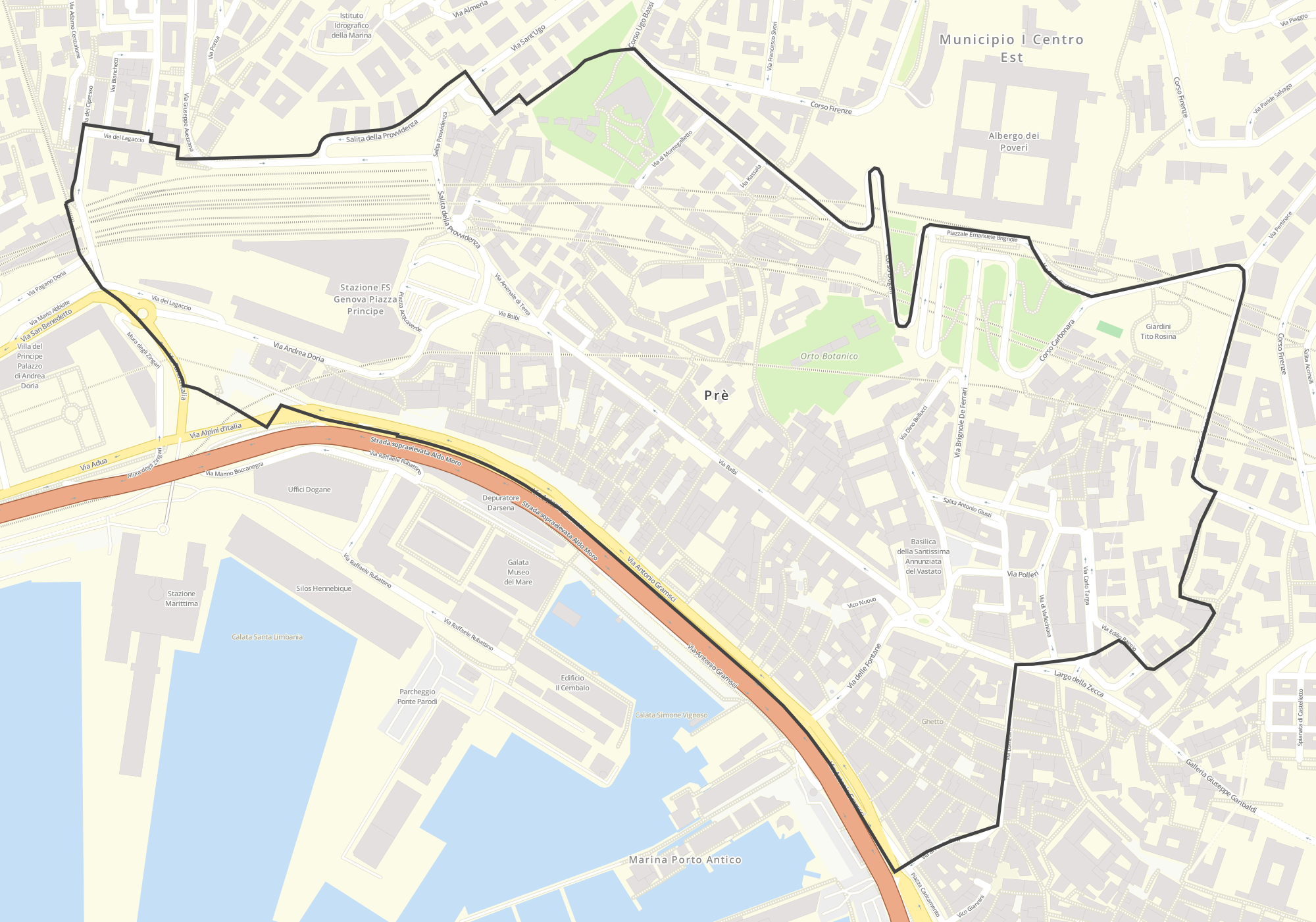
Map of Prè

== Geography ==
Prè is located north west in the old town of Genoa, between two circles of city walls, the older Barbarossa walls (12th century) and the 14th century city walls, but includes also a small portion of old town inside the Barbarossa walls, with via del Campo. The neighbourhood occupies the semi-plain area between the port and the rear hill.

The central and most characteristic area of the neighborhood is that of Via Prè and Via del Campo, with its narrow alleys (the typical Genoese "caruggi"), upstream of which is Via Balbi with its noble palaces.

== History ==
The first settlements in the area date back to the second half of 12th century, when outside of the "Saint Faith Gate" (now called "Vacca's Gate") of the "Barbarossa" walls some buildings were built to assist travelers along the road leading from the city to the west. Included were several hospitals, founded by religious orders to offer accommodation and assistance to Crusaders, pilgrims, and merchants who were traveling from the port of Genoa to the Holy Land and the East. The best known of these was the Commandery of St. John of Prè, of the Knights of the Hospital of Saint John of Jerusalem, or Knights Hospitaller, built in 1180.

In the same period, dockyards for repairing ships were built in the near port, in the same place where two centuries later would be established the main base of the Genoese Navy. This first port terminal gave an economic boost to the development of the neighbourhood. In 1347, the whole neighborhood was enclosed into the city walls, by building a new section of walls on the north-west side.

During the 17th century the noble families of Balbi and Durazzo built, upstream the neighbourhood some luxurious palaces along a new wide street, Strada Balbi. In the 19th century another important road was opened, Carlo Alberto road, suitable for transit of wagons coming to and from the port and in 1860 the Genoa Principe railway station was completed in the north west area of Prè.

In the 20th century, when the business centre of Genoa moved from the old town to De Ferrari Square, a period of decline began for Prè, and after World War II some areas were populated by petty criminals who earned their living by cigarette smuggling, prostitution and receiving stolen goods.

During the seventies the alleys of Prè became a centre of narcotics smuggling, managed before by Italian mafias and later by non-EU immigrants, causing the abandonment by most of the original inhabitants and the consequent degradation of buildings. Today, after many years of decline also these areas of the neighbourhood are showing signs of recovery.

== Architecture ==
=== Palazzi dei Rolli ===
The "Rolli di Genova" were, at the time of the Republic of Genoa, an official list of public lodging palaces of eminent Genoese families which aspired to host, by draw, foreign notable people visiting Genoa. Most of these buildings still exist, and in 2006 forty-two of them were inscribed by UNESCO in the list of World Heritage Site.

In Prè are 20 of these palaces (11 of which included in the list of World Heritage Site).

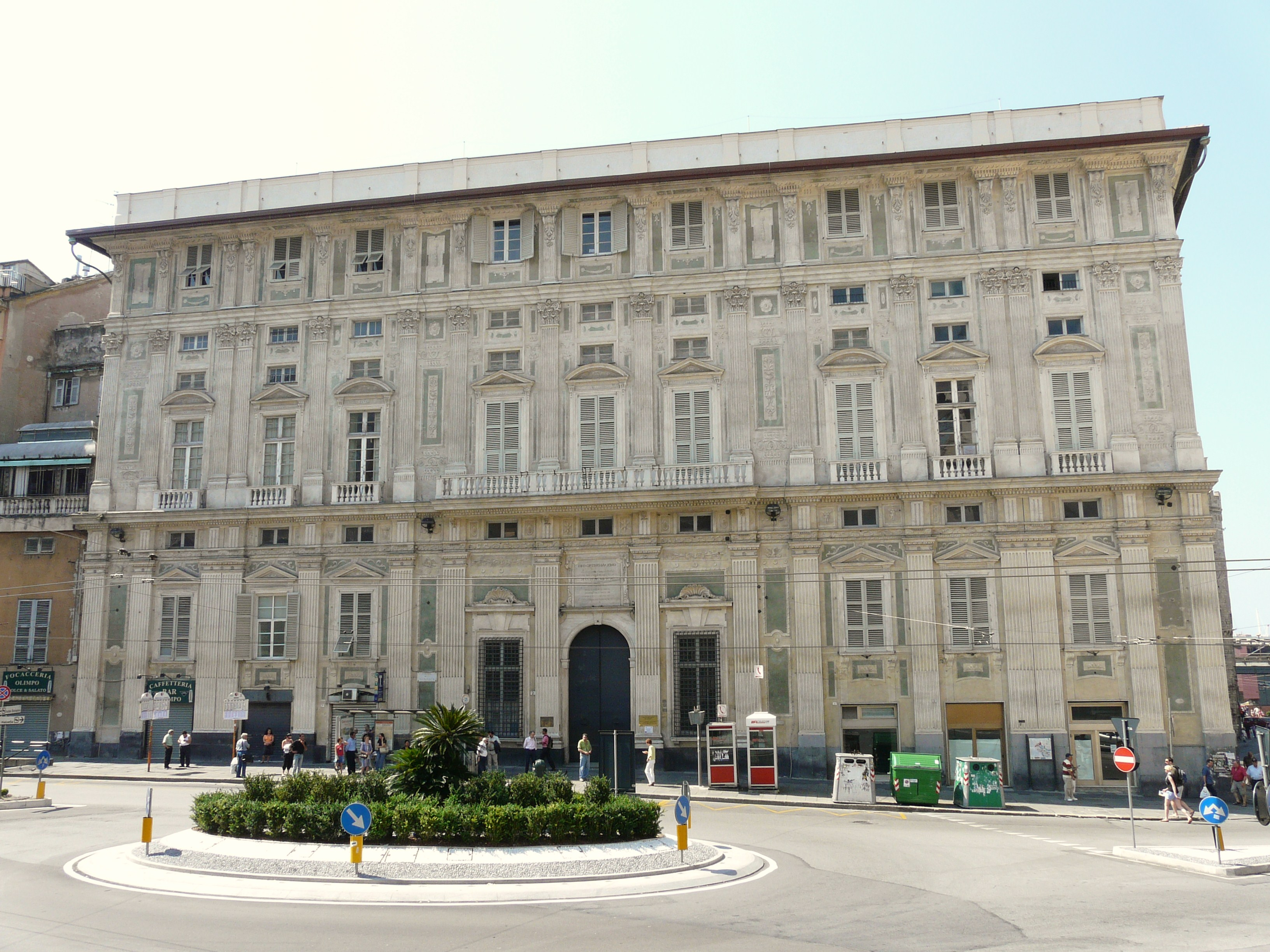
Belimbau Palace

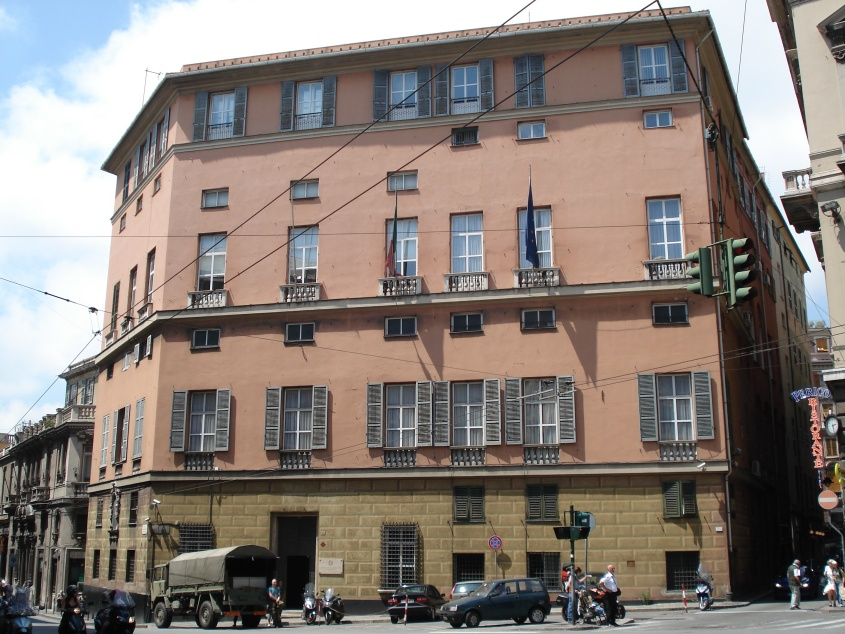
Lomellini-Patrone Palace

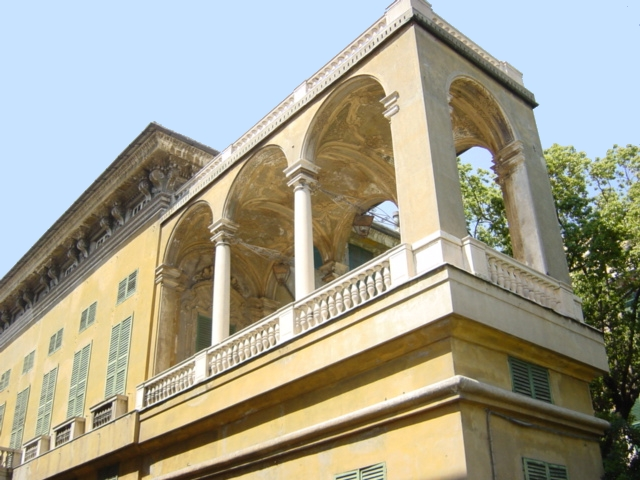
Detail of the loggia of Durazzo-Pallavicini Palace

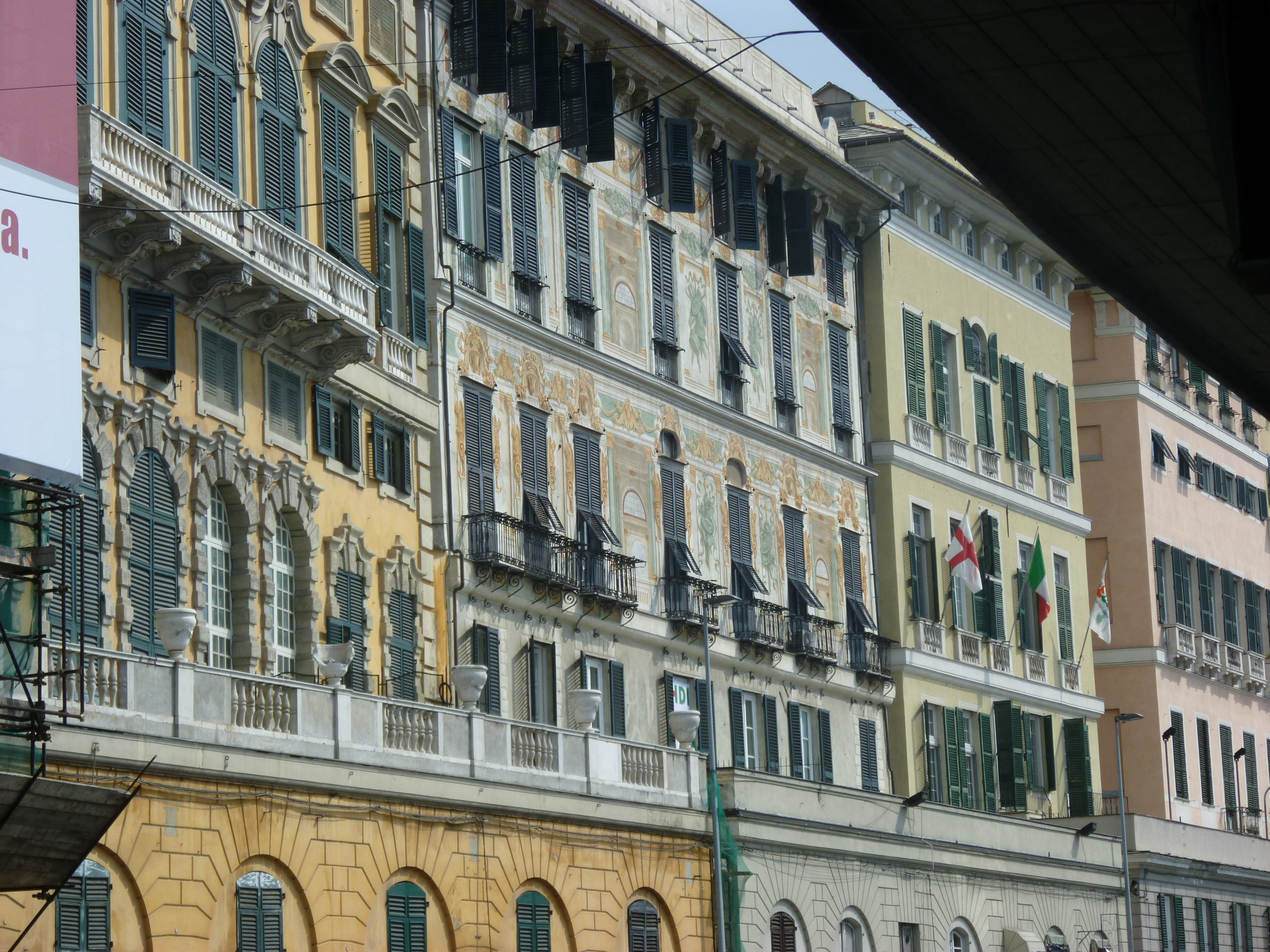
Rear façade of Durazzo-Cattaneo Adorno Palace and Bartolomeo Invrea Palace, overlooking Gramsci Street

=== Royal Palace ===
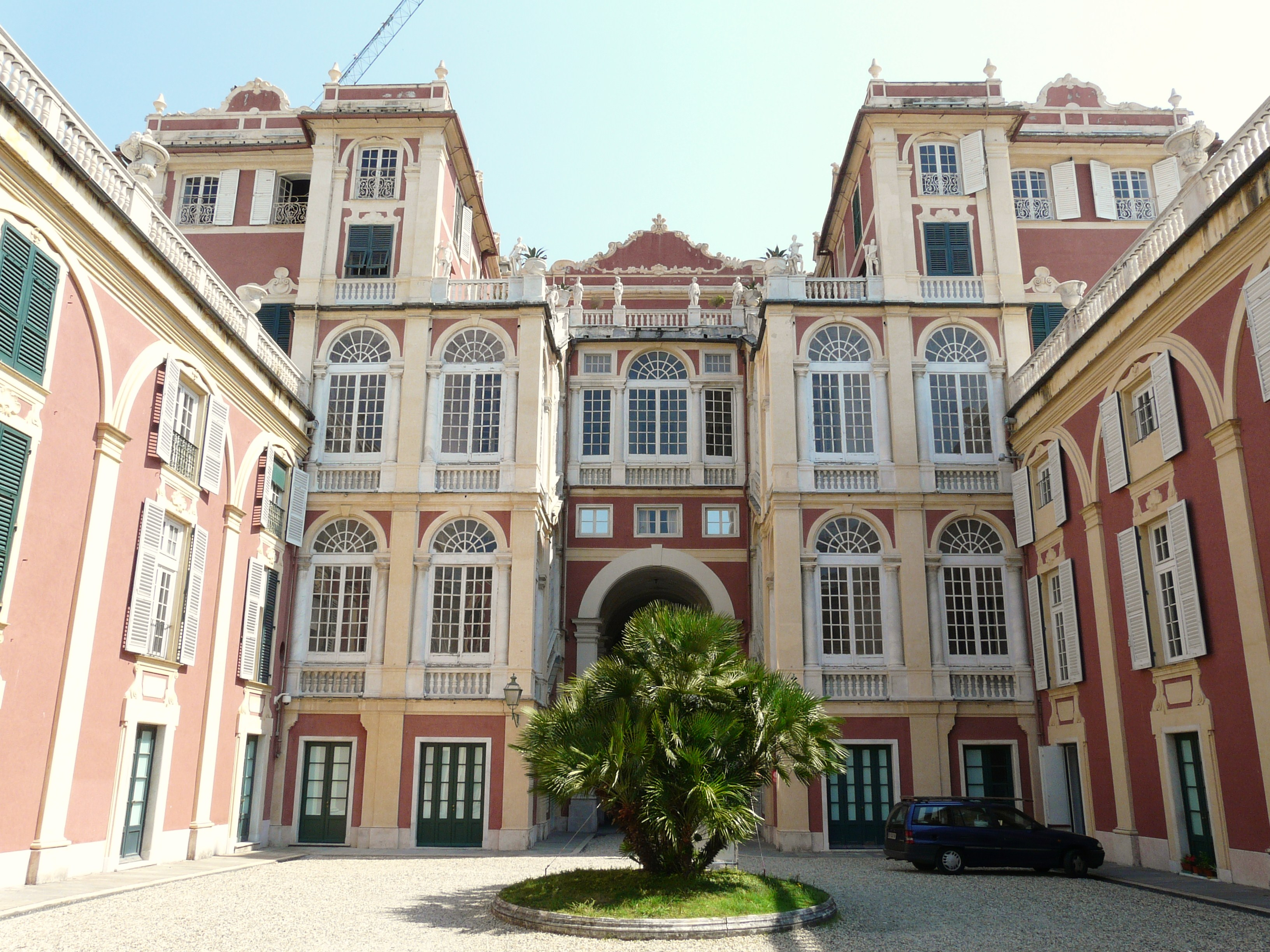
Royal Palace of Genoa

Among Rolli Stefano Balbi palace, best known as the Royal Palace is the most remarkable. It was built in 17th century and on 1824 was purchased by the king Charles Felix of Sardinia as the residence of the royal court in Genoa. In 1919 Victor Emmanuel III handed it over to Italian state, together with its art collections.

=== University Palace ===
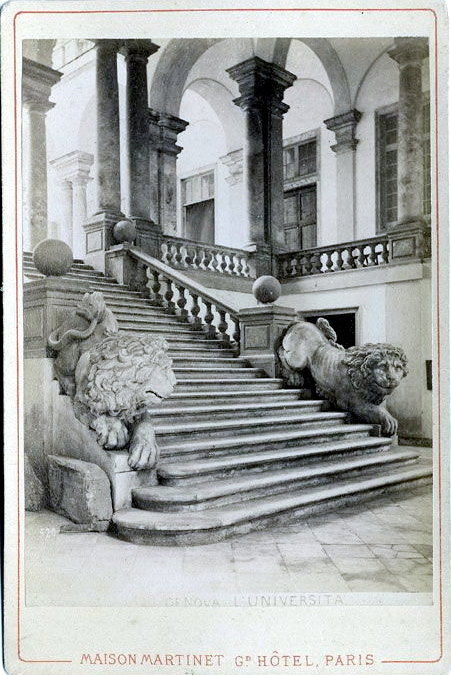
Vintage picture of University Palace

In Via Balbi the former College of the Jesuits, designed by Bartolomeo Bianco between 1634 and 1636, hosts since 1775 the seat of the University of Genoa. Bianco was inspired by the model developed by Domenico and Giovanni Ponzello for Doria-Tursi palace, built at different levels, adapted to the slope of the land, with a spectacular marble staircase that from the entrance hall leads to a raised courtyard, surrounded by columns, from which other staircases reach the upper floors and the rear botanical garden.

The palace today houses the rectorate office, some university departments and administrative offices. Next to the building is the former church of Saints Jerome and Francis Xavier, built in the mid 17th century, now university library, where ancient manuscripts and incunables are preserved.

=== D'Albertis Castle ===
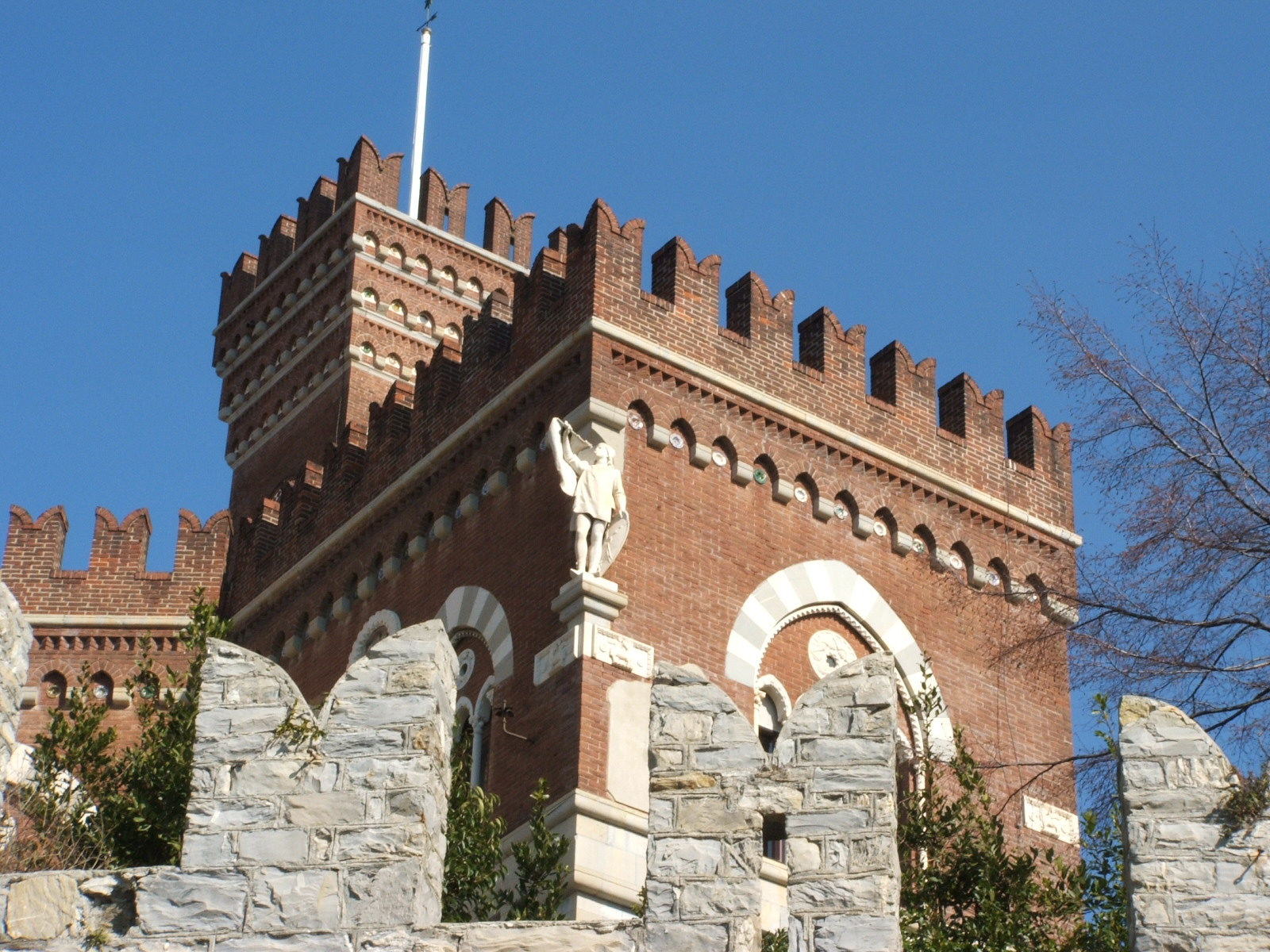
D'Albertis Castle

D'Albertis Castle was built in Neo- Gothic style between 1886 and 1892 on the ruins of a 16th-century bastion of the city walls, overlooking the city from a hill on the border between the neighbourhoods of Prè and Castelletto, for the explorer Enrico Alberto d'Albertis. When he died, in 1932, the castle was donated to the city of Genoa, along with the collections he had gathered in his travels, that make up the original nucleus of the Museum of World Cultures, housed in the castle.

=== Vacca's Gate ===
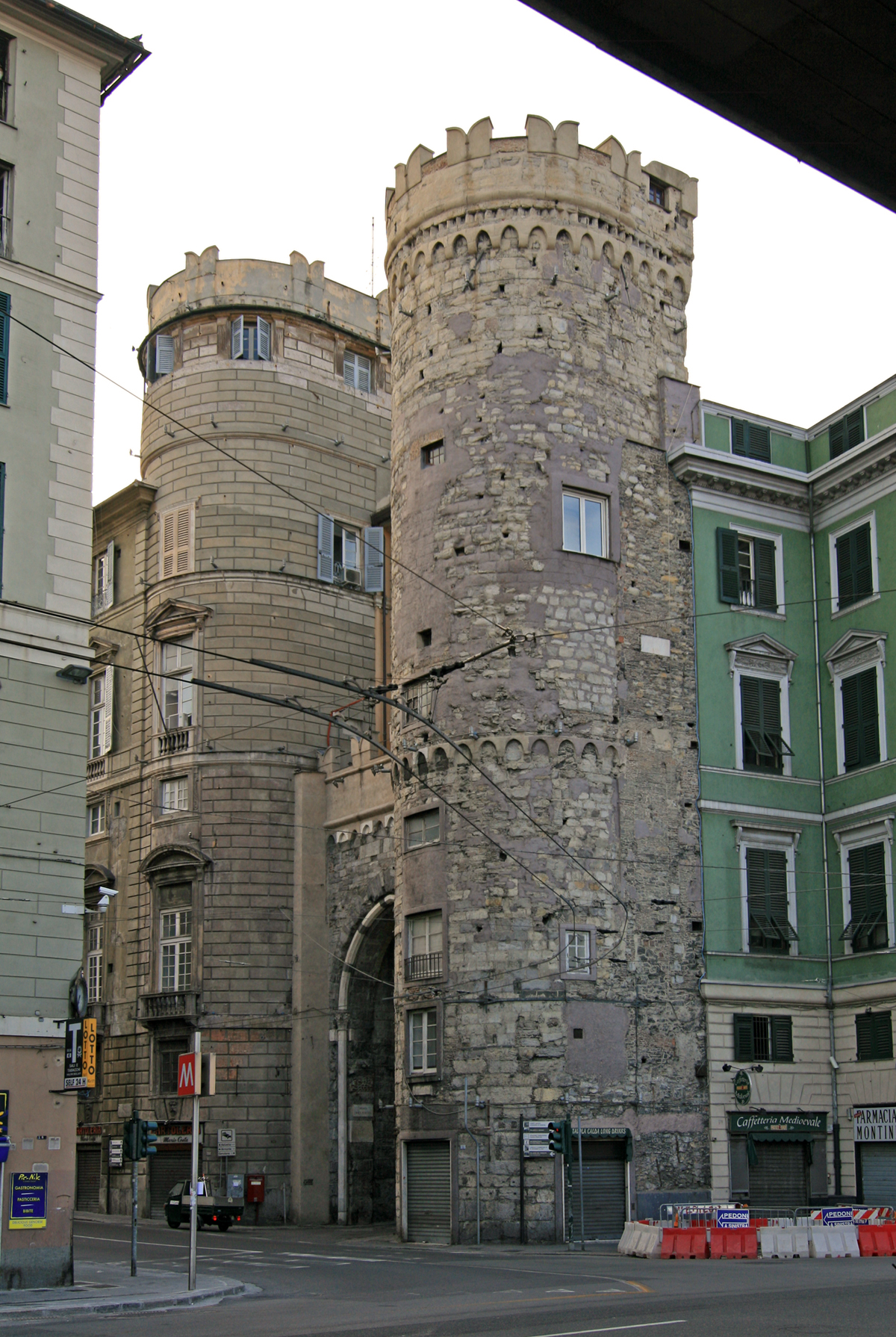
Vacca's Gate

St. Faith Gate, known as Vacca's Gate, was part of the "Barbarossa" city walls and was built in the 12th century. In 17th century it was incorporated in two noble palaces. The gate, west entrance to the city, like the best known and coeval "Porta Soprana", consists of two semicircular crenellated towers on either sides of a lancet arch.

=== Galata Museo del Mare ===
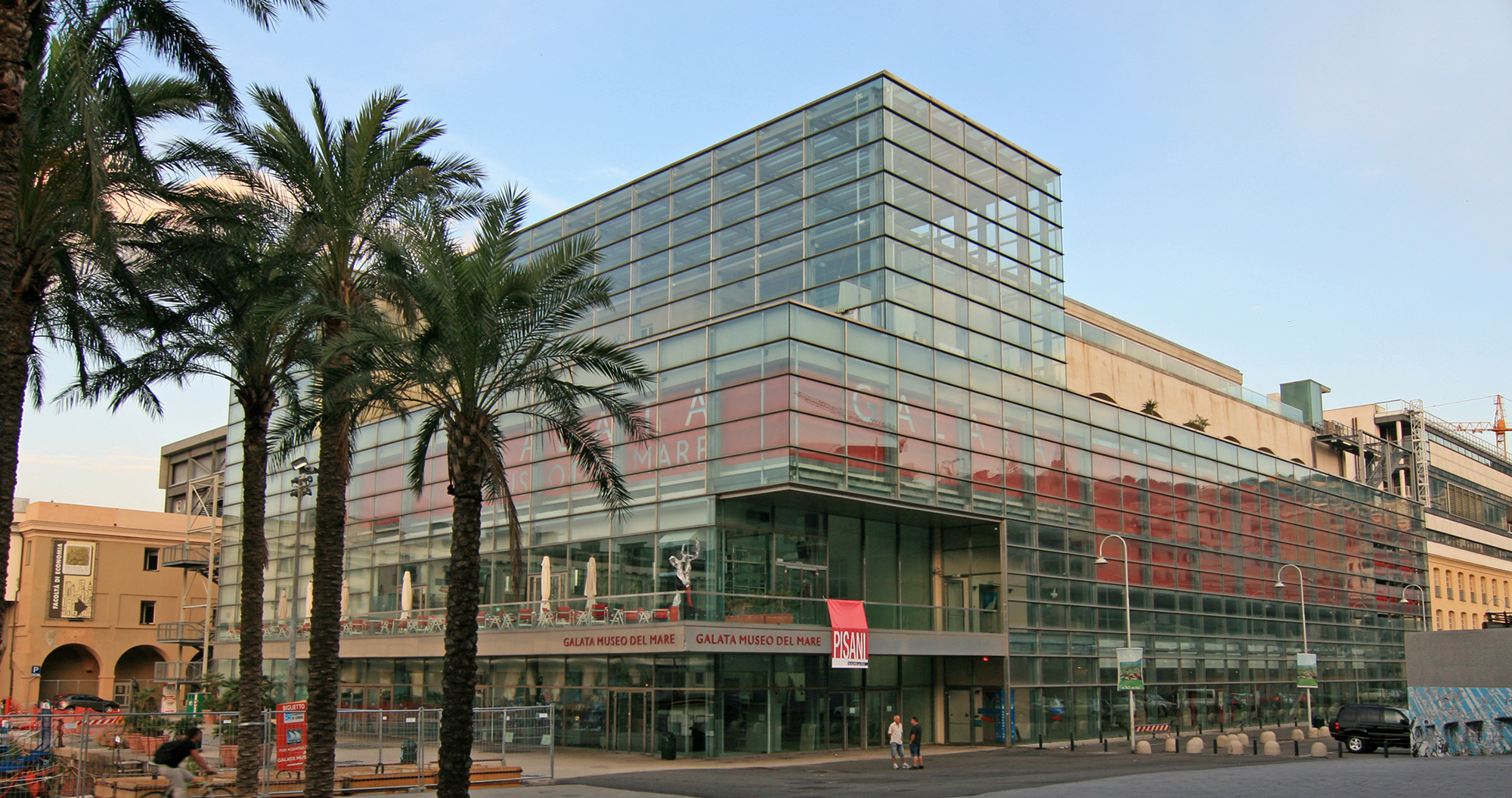
Galata Museo del Mare

The Galata Museo del Mare is a maritime museum designed by the Spanish architect Guillermo Vázquez Consuegra. The museum, inaugurated in 2004, is located in the ancient "Darsena", the base of the Genoese Navy's fleet between the 13th and the 18th century and incorporates the dockyard called Galata (from the name of the Genoese colony in the homonymous district of Istanbul) where at the time of the Republic of Genoa war galleys were built and maintained.

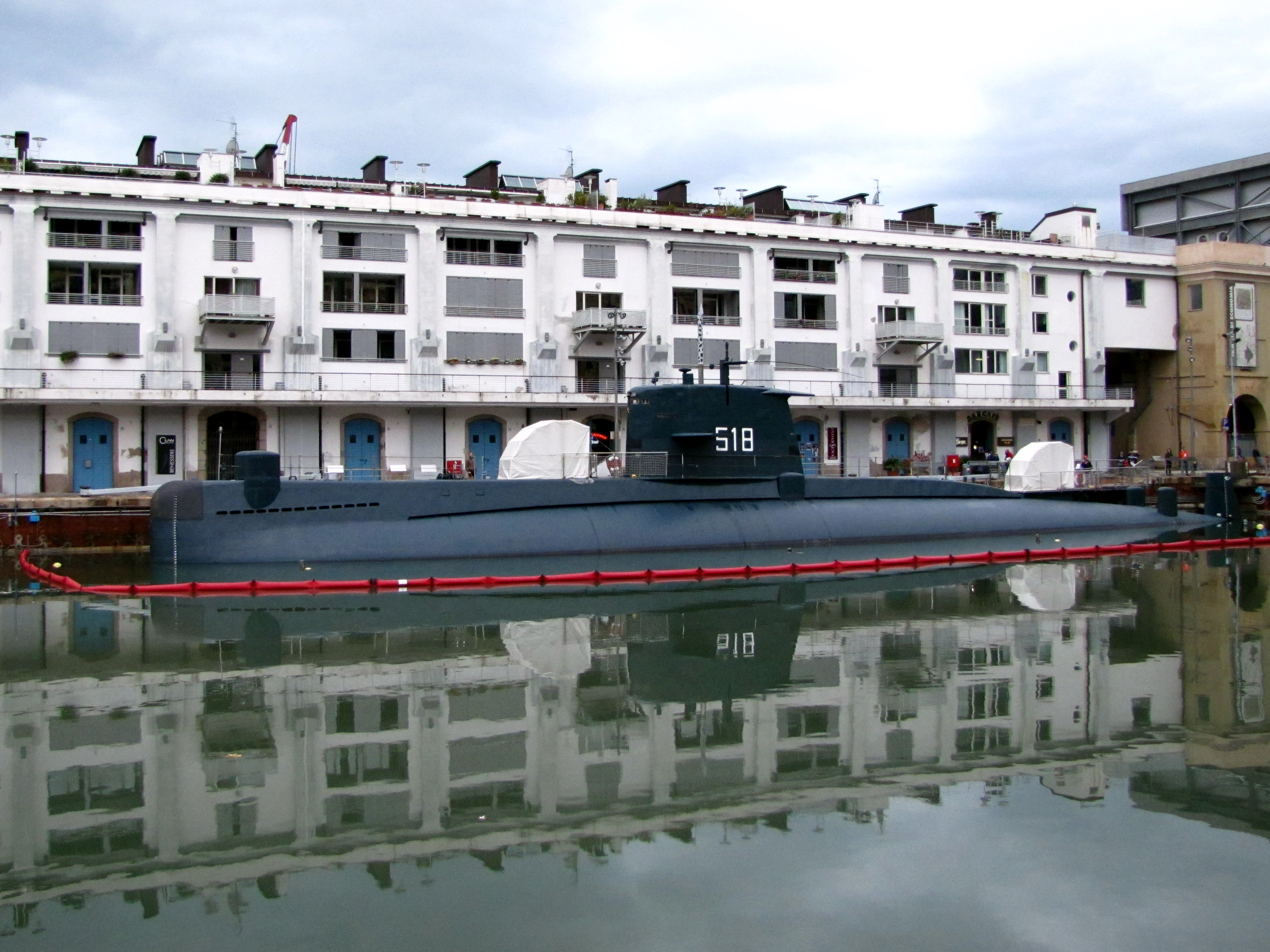
The submarine Nazario Sauro

The museum occupies 20 halls on an area of about 10,000 m². Since September 2009 the submarine Nazario Sauro, retired from the Italian Navy in 2002, has been moored in the small harbor basin in front of the museum, adapted for public visits and integrated in the museum visit path.

=== Places of Worship ===
==== Commandery of St. John of Prè ====
The Commandery of St. John of Prè is a complex founded in 1180 that includes two Romanesque churches at different levels, a monastery that belonged to the Knights Hospitaller and a hospital to offer accommodation and assistance to Crusaders and pilgrims sailing from the port of Genoa to the Holy Land.

During all Middle Ages it had been an important point of reference for all travelers transiting in the port of Genoa.

==== Basilica della SS. Annunziata del Vastato ====
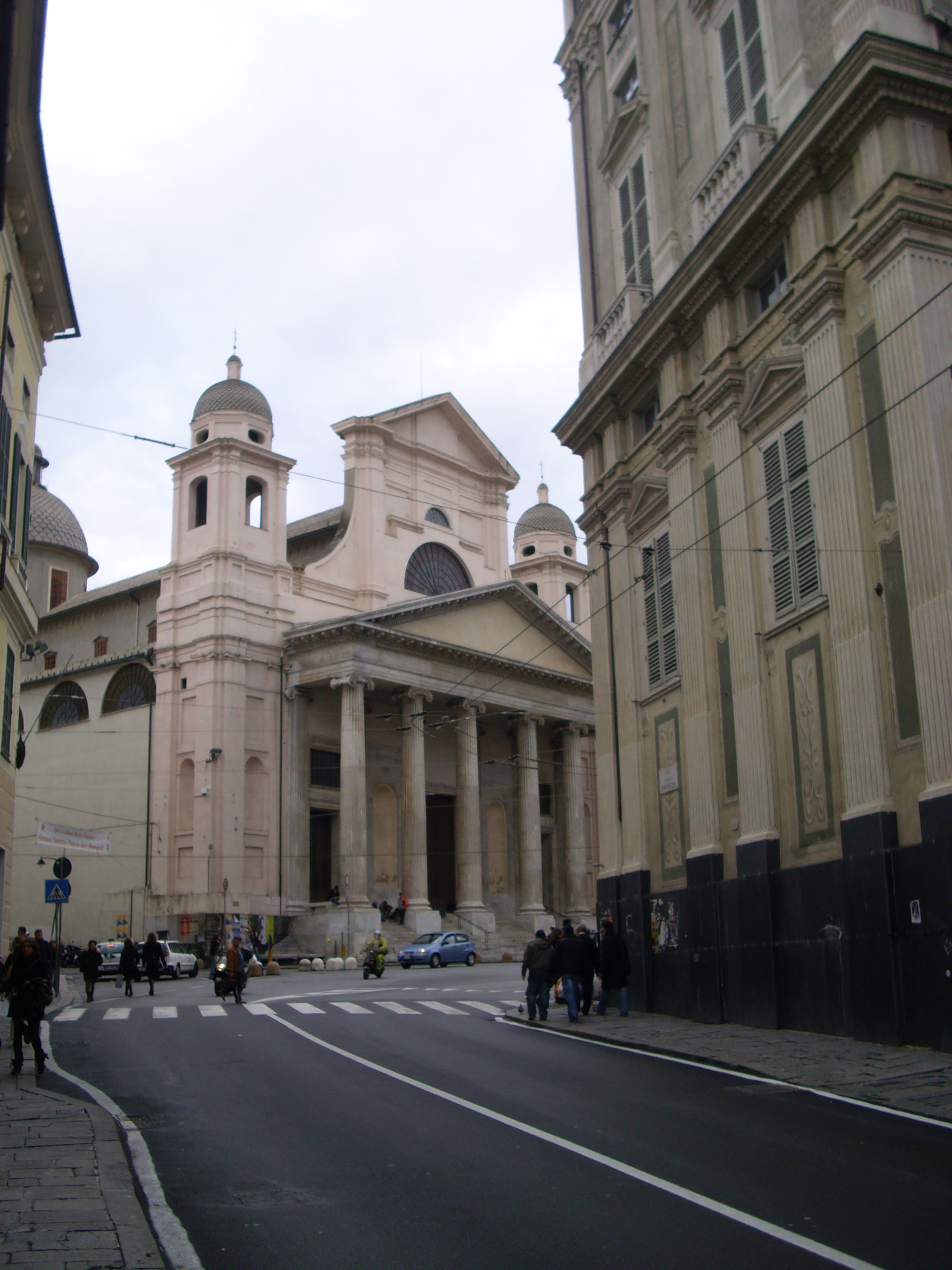
The church of "Nunziata"

The Basilica della Santissima Annunziata del Vastato, simply called "Nunziata", is a major Genoese church. The interior of the church is Baroque, but the façade, with a high portico and two bell towers, was built only in the 19th century in Neoclassical style.

The interior has a Latin cross plant with a nave and two aisles with some chapels decorated with frescoes, paintings, inlaid marble and stucco, works by the greatest Genoese artists of the 17th century.

The church, built in 1520 in Gothic style, anachronistic at that time, was given its present Baroque appearance in the first half of the 17th century by architects Giovanni Domenico Casella and Giacomo Porta, with the funding of Lomellini family. Giovanni Battista and Giovanni Carlone made frescoes in the ceiling of the nave, aisles and transept.

The Neoclassical façade, designed by Giovanni Battista Resasco in the 19th century, has a tall portico with six Ionic columns. The serious damage wrought by bombing during World War II has been restored in postwar era.

==== Other Catholic churches ====
- Santi Vittore e Carlo, in Baroque style, is located in via Balbi. It was built in 1635 by Bartolomeo Bianco.
- Nostra Signora del Carmine e Sant'Agnese is located in via Brignole De Ferrari. The church, built in 1262, was restored over the centuries, but its interior preserves the original Gothic structure.
- San Sisto, located in via Prè, was founded at the end of the 11th century but completely rebuilt in Neoclassical style in 1828 by Giovanni Battista Resasco and Pietro Pellegrini.
- San Filippo Neri, in late-Baroque style, is located in via Lomellini, and was built in the second half of 17th century. Close the church is the oratory (18th century), that for its excellent acoustics is often used as a concert hall.
- San Marcellino is a small and simple church near to via del Campo, where the future pope Innocent VIII was baptized. It is one of the oldest churches of Genoa. It is documented since 11th century, but was completely rebuilt in the 17th century.
- Santa Fede, currently deconsecrated, is documented since 12th century and it was rebuilt in Baroque style in 1673. It is located in via delle Fontane, opposite Vacca's Gate. At present it hosts municipal offices.
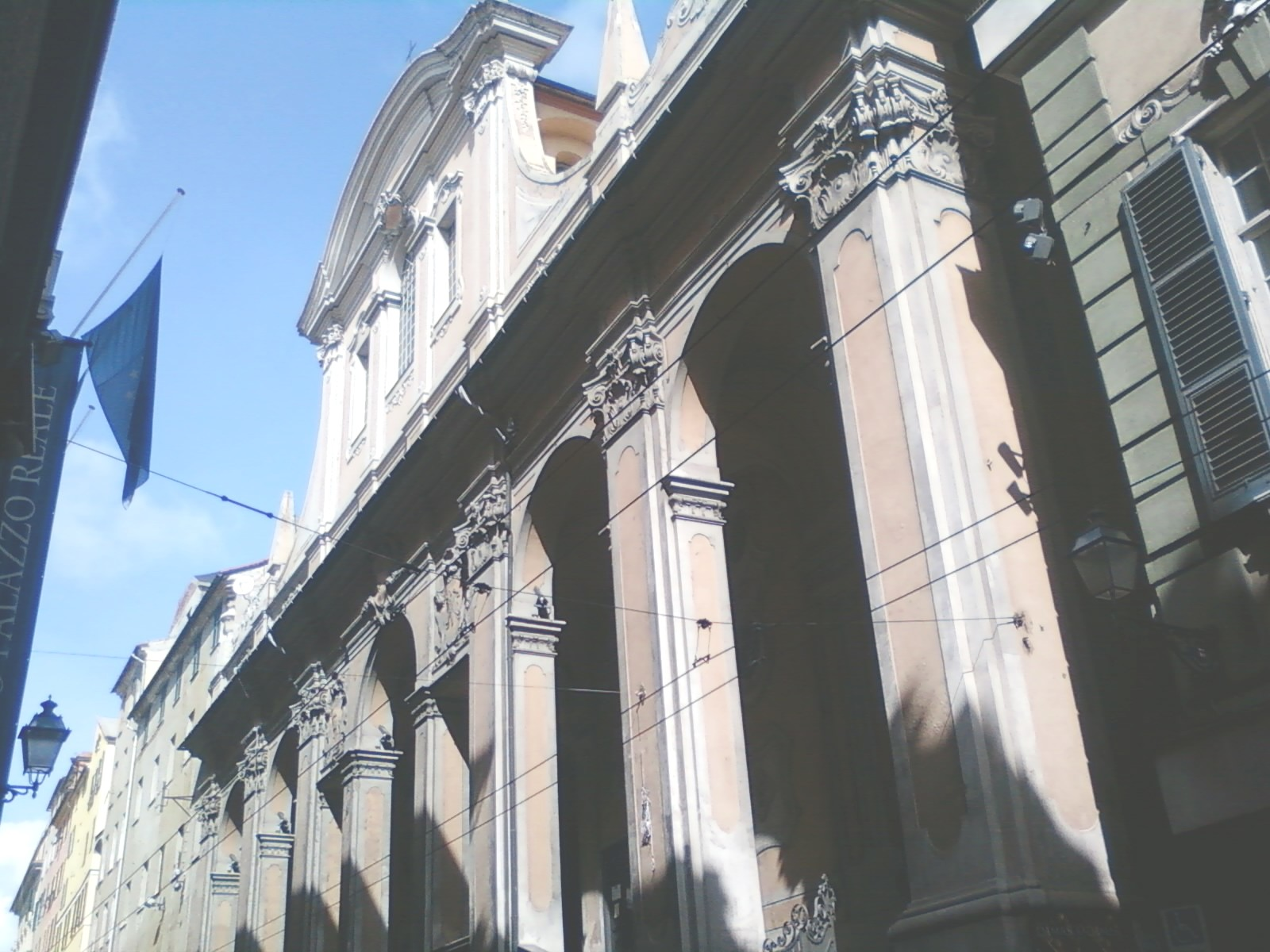
Santi Vittore e Carlo

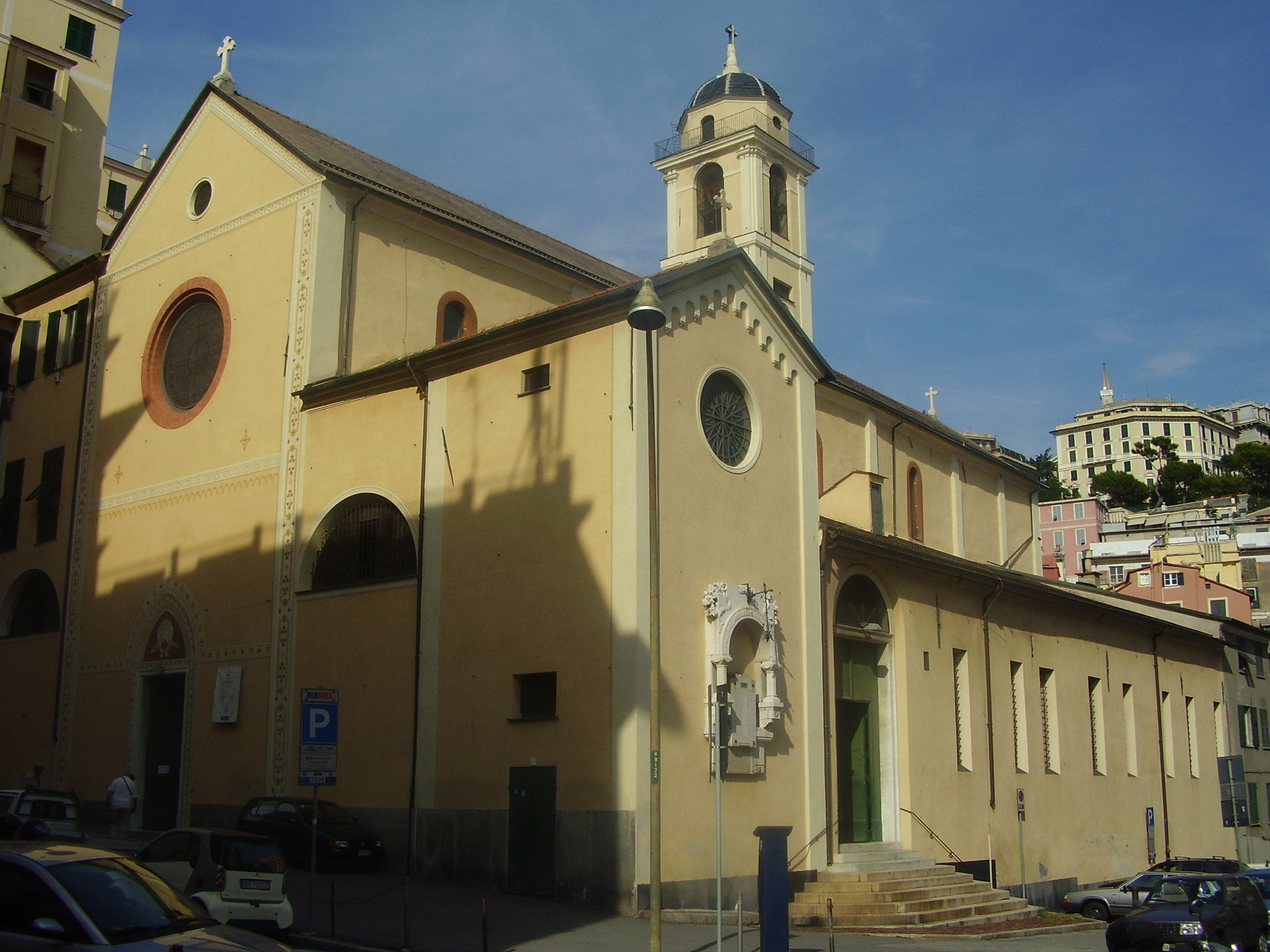
Nostra Signora del Carmine

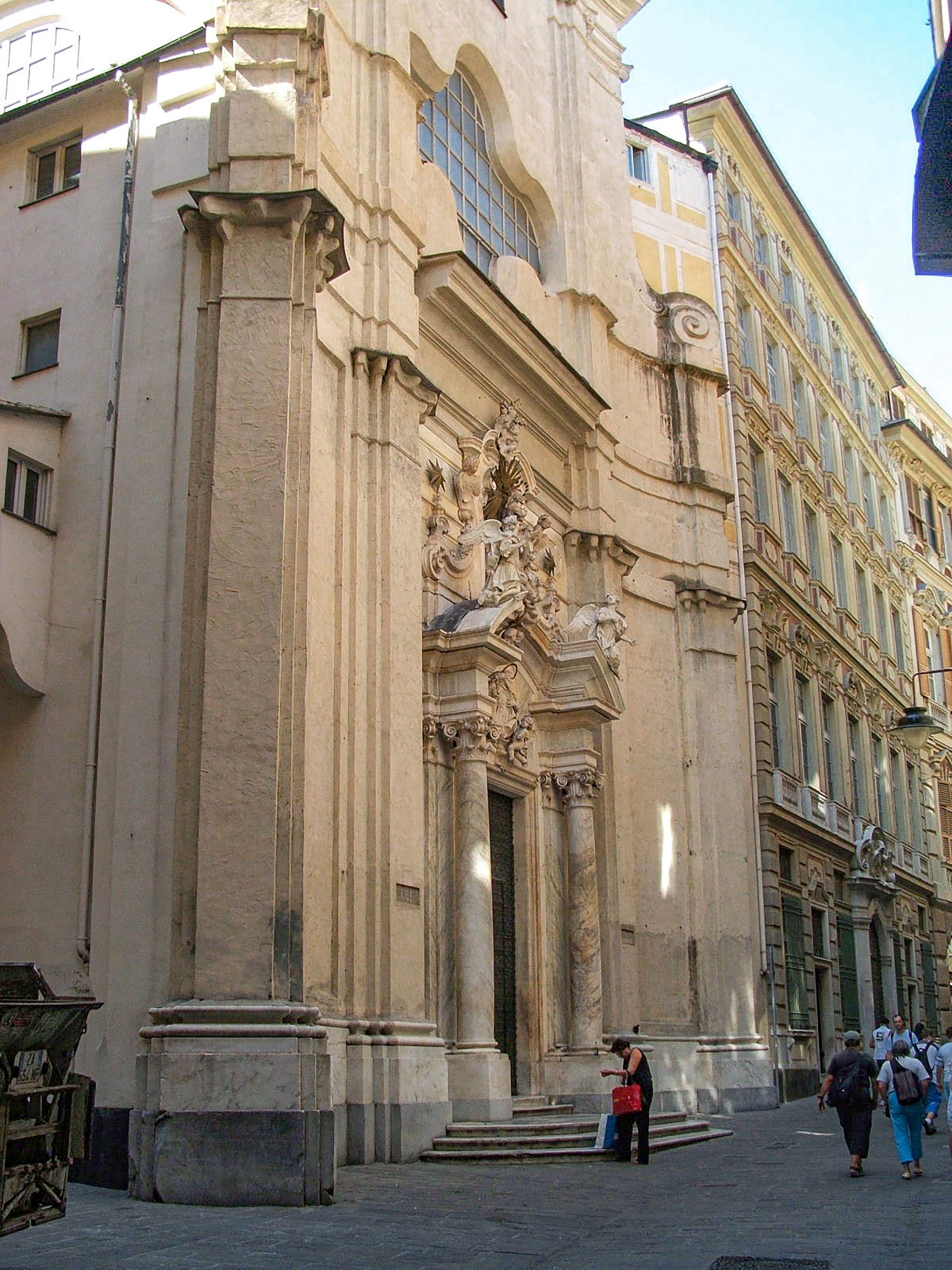
San Filippo Neri

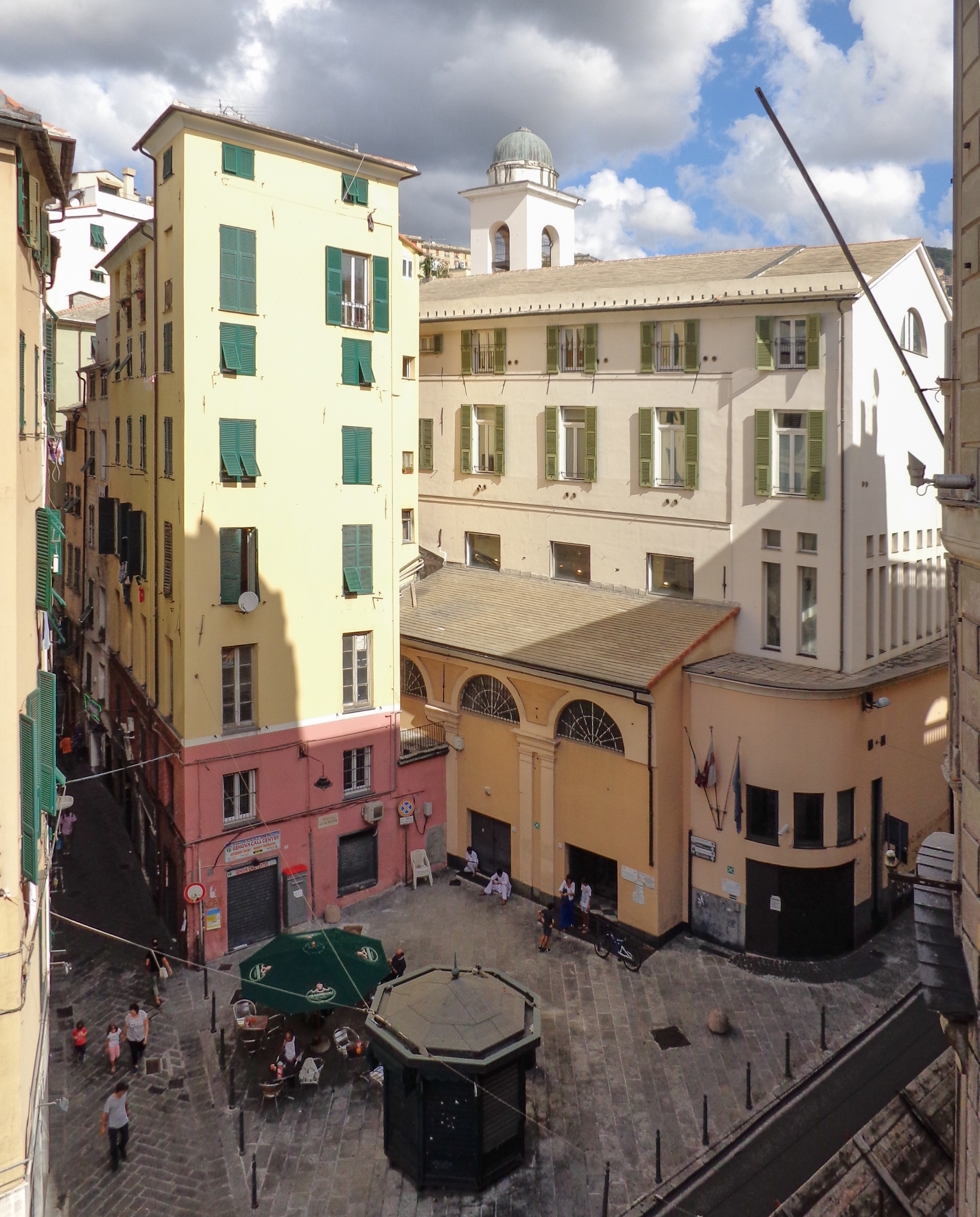
Santa Fede

== Notable people ==
- St. Ugo Canefri (1148–1233), Knight Hospitaller, lived most of his life in the Commandery of St. John of Prè.
- Giovanni Battista Cybo (1432–1492), pope since 1484 as Innocent VIII, born in Prè and baptized in the church of St. Marcellino
- Palmiro Togliatti (1893–1964), communist politician, was born in Prè, where his family temporarily resided, but he lived in Genoa only few years in his childhood
- Fabrizio De André (1940–1999), singer-songwriter, has indissolubly linked his name with via del Campo, the street to which he devoted a famous song and where a former music shop is now a small museum of his life and his music (Via del Campo 29 rosso).

== Bibliography ==
- Guida d’Italia – Liguria. TCI, Milan. 2009.
- Caraceni Poleggi, Fiorella (1984). Genova – Guida Sagep. SAGEP and Automobile Club of Genoa.
- Casalis, Goffredo (1841). Dizionario geografico, storico, statistico e commerciale degli stati di S.M. il Re di Sardegna. G. Maspero, Turin.
