= Great Genoa =

Area of municipality of Genoa, Italy

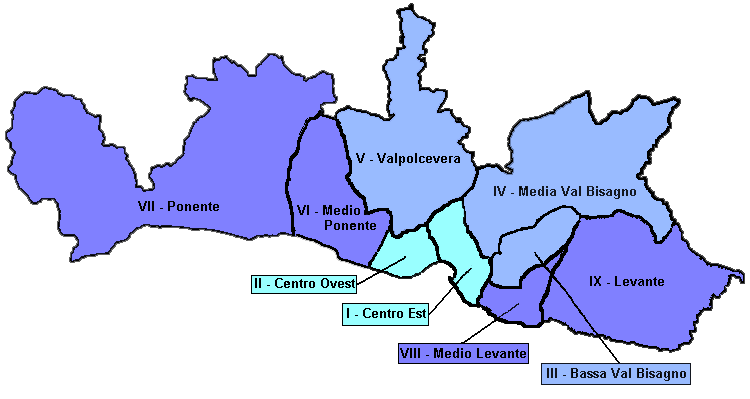
The 9 districts of the present municipality of Genoa. The original municipality correspond to the Municipio I Centro Est and part of Municipio II Centro Ovest (cyan area)

The term Great Genoa (Italian: Grande Genova) refers to the present area of the municipality of Genoa, in the north west of Italy. Great Genoa extends for over 30 km along the coast of Ligurian Sea from Nervi to Voltri, and up the Polcevera valley of the Polcevera river and the Bisagno river valley of the Bisagno river.

Great Genoa dates from 1926, when 19 municipalities were added to the six municipalities incorporated in 1874.

This aggregation makes Genoa a polycentric city, as the Genoese urban area is made up of several towns each with a strong sense of belonging, a consolidated economic and social structure and an old town, so they are not perceived as "suburbs". Reflecting the strong local identity the inhabitants of many neighborhoods, former municipality, still say "I am going to Genoa" and not "I am going downtown" to state their intention to go to the city center.

== Historical development ==
The aggregation of neighboring municipalities was in 1926, but the process started many years earlier.

Until 1874 the municipality of the city of Genoa was the same as the urban area surrounded by the 17th century city walls, divided into six districts, called "sestieri":

- Maddalena
- Molo
- Portoria
- Prè
- San Teodoro
- San Vincenzo

With increasing population in the 19th century, the city expanded into the hills behind the old town, but still within the city walls: during that time were built the stately neighborhood of Castelletto, and those of Oregina and Lagaccio for working-class people.

=== The annexation of 1874 ===
After this first urban expansion it was necessary to find space for new facilities and residential neighborhoods for the middle classes.

In 1873 the mayor of Genoa Andrea Podestà proposed a plan of territorial aggrandizement in the lower Val Bisagno, which was subsequently approved by a decree of King Vittorio Emanuele II which annexed six municipalities to Genoa on 1 January 1874:

- Foce
- Marassi
- San Francesco d’Albaro
- San Fruttuoso
- San Martino d’Albaro
- Staglieno

=== The annexation of 1926 ===
Great Genoa was completed in 1926 when 19 municipalities were annexed to Genoa. Among them, beside some small municipalities, were towns with a strong social identity such as Sampierdarena and Sestri Ponente. With this expansion the population of Genoa grew from 335,000 to 580,000 inhabitants.

==== Annexed municipalities ====
In the East:

- Apparizione
- Nervi
- Quarto dei Mille
- Quinto al Mare
- Sant'Ilario Ligure

In the Bisagno valley:

- Bavari
- Molassana
- Struppa

In the Polcevera valley:

- Bolzaneto
- Borzoli
- Pontedecimo
- Rivarolo Ligure
- San Quirico in Val Polcevera

In the West:

- Cornigliano Ligure
- Pegli
- Pra'
- Sampierdarena
- Sestri Ponente
- Voltri
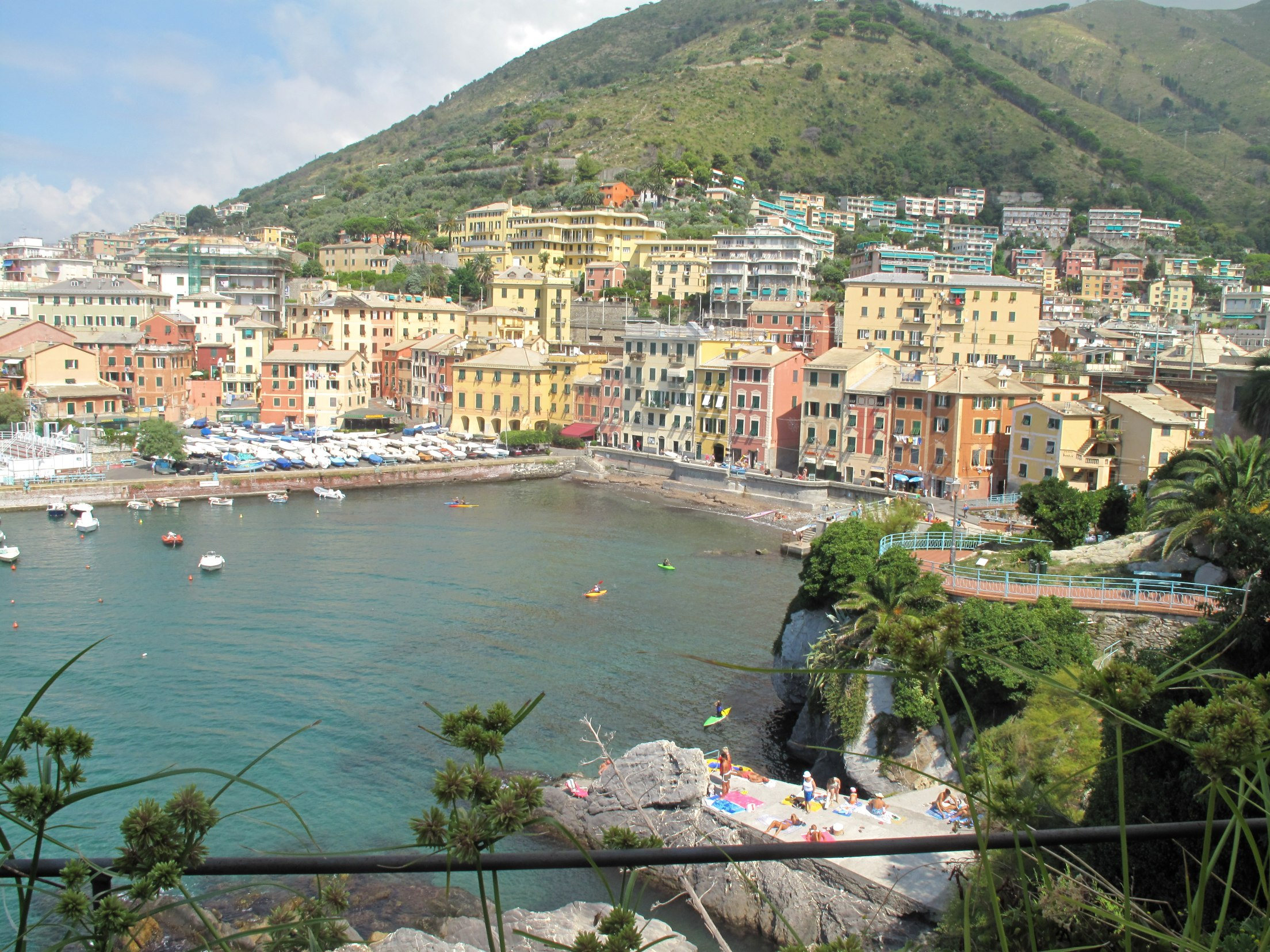
Nervi

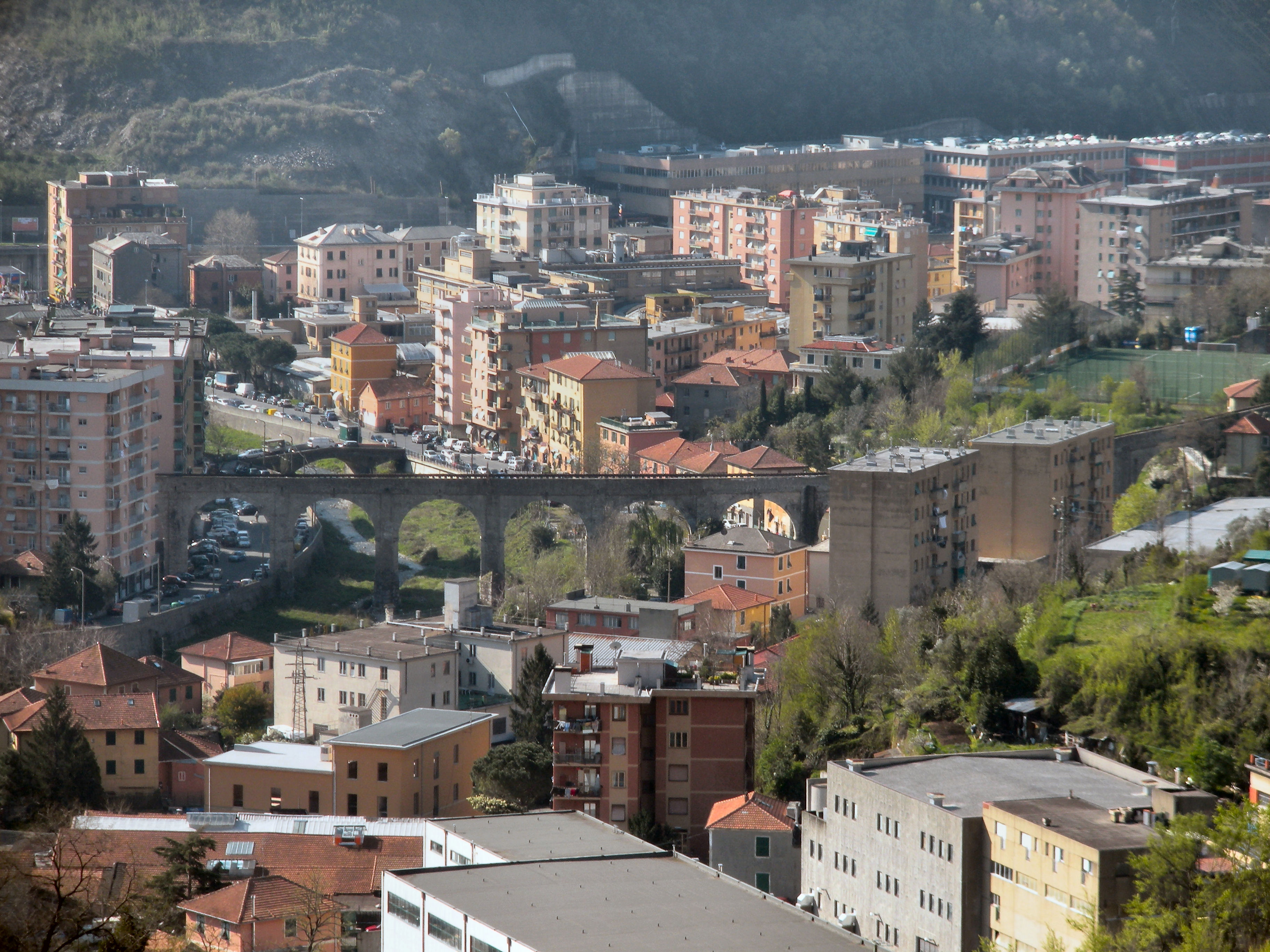
Molassana

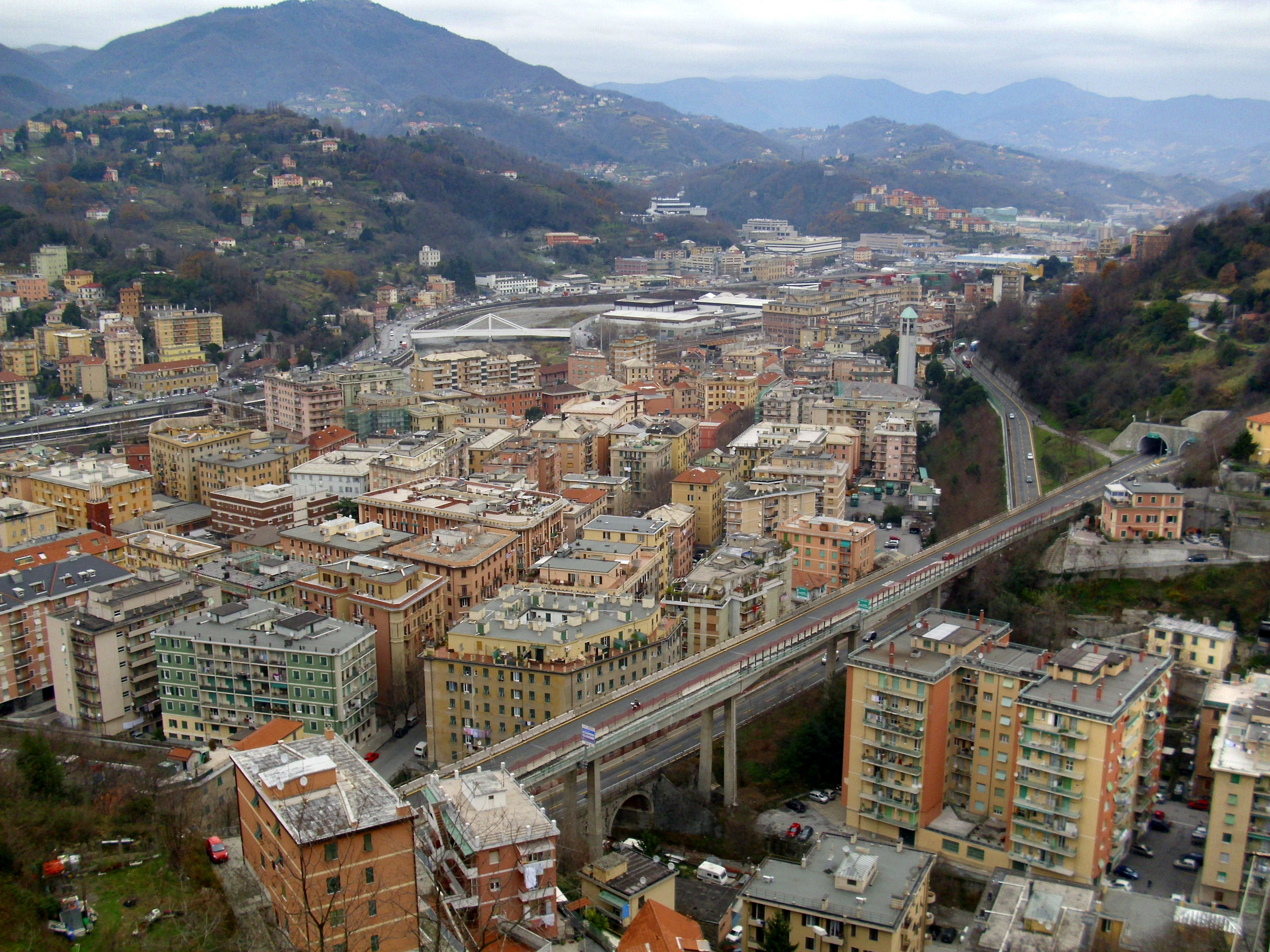
Bolzaneto

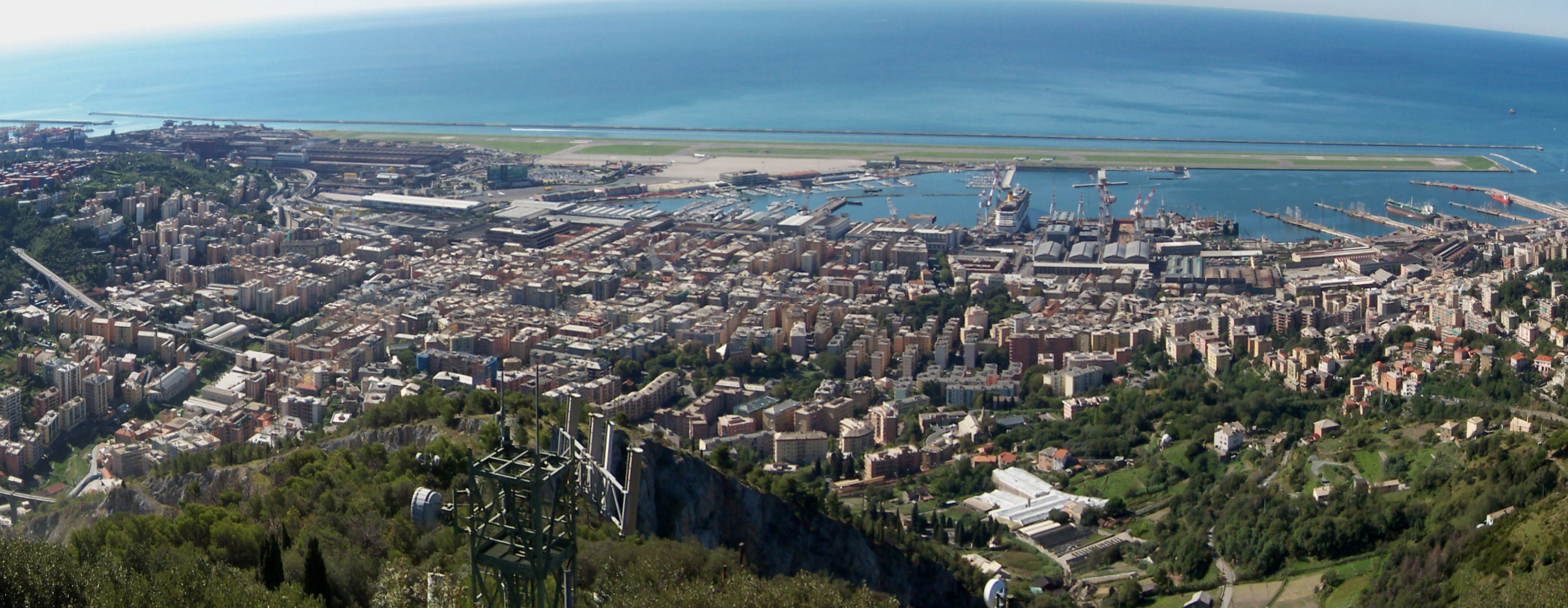
Sestri Ponente
