= Sampierdarena =

Italian city

Coordinates: 44°25′N 8°54′E

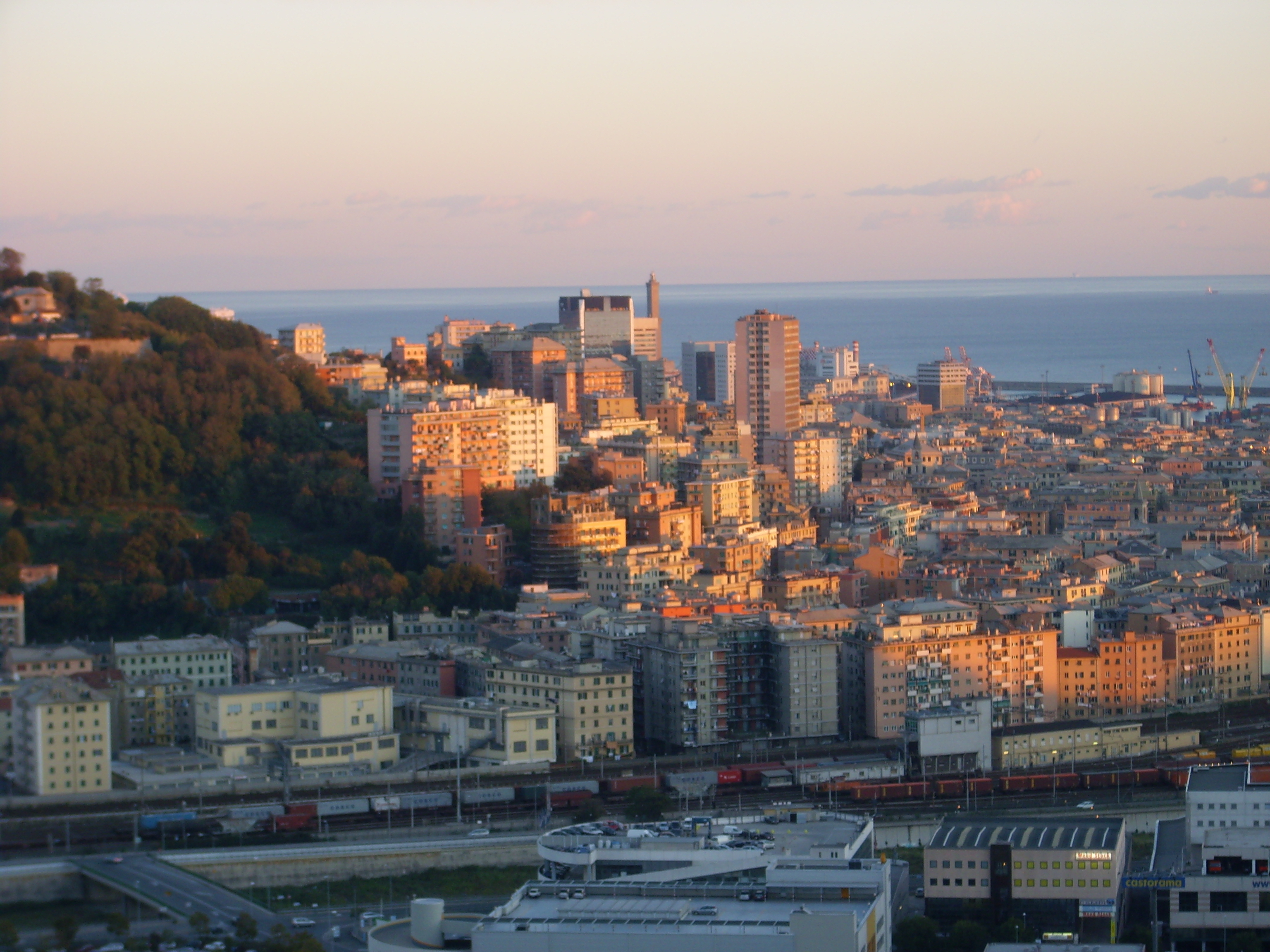

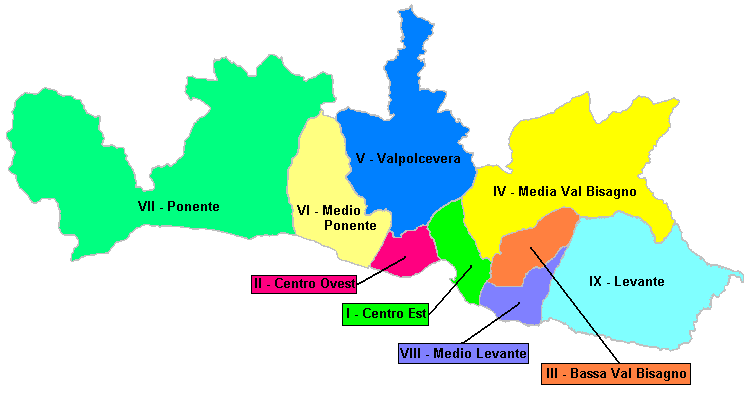
The West Central municipio is marked in pink

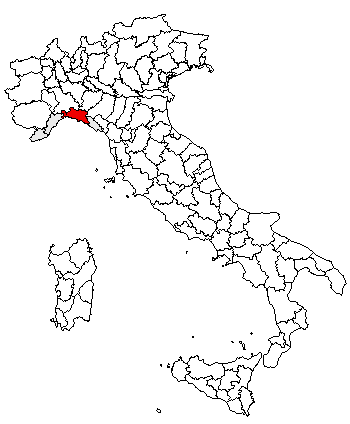
Location of the province of Genoa

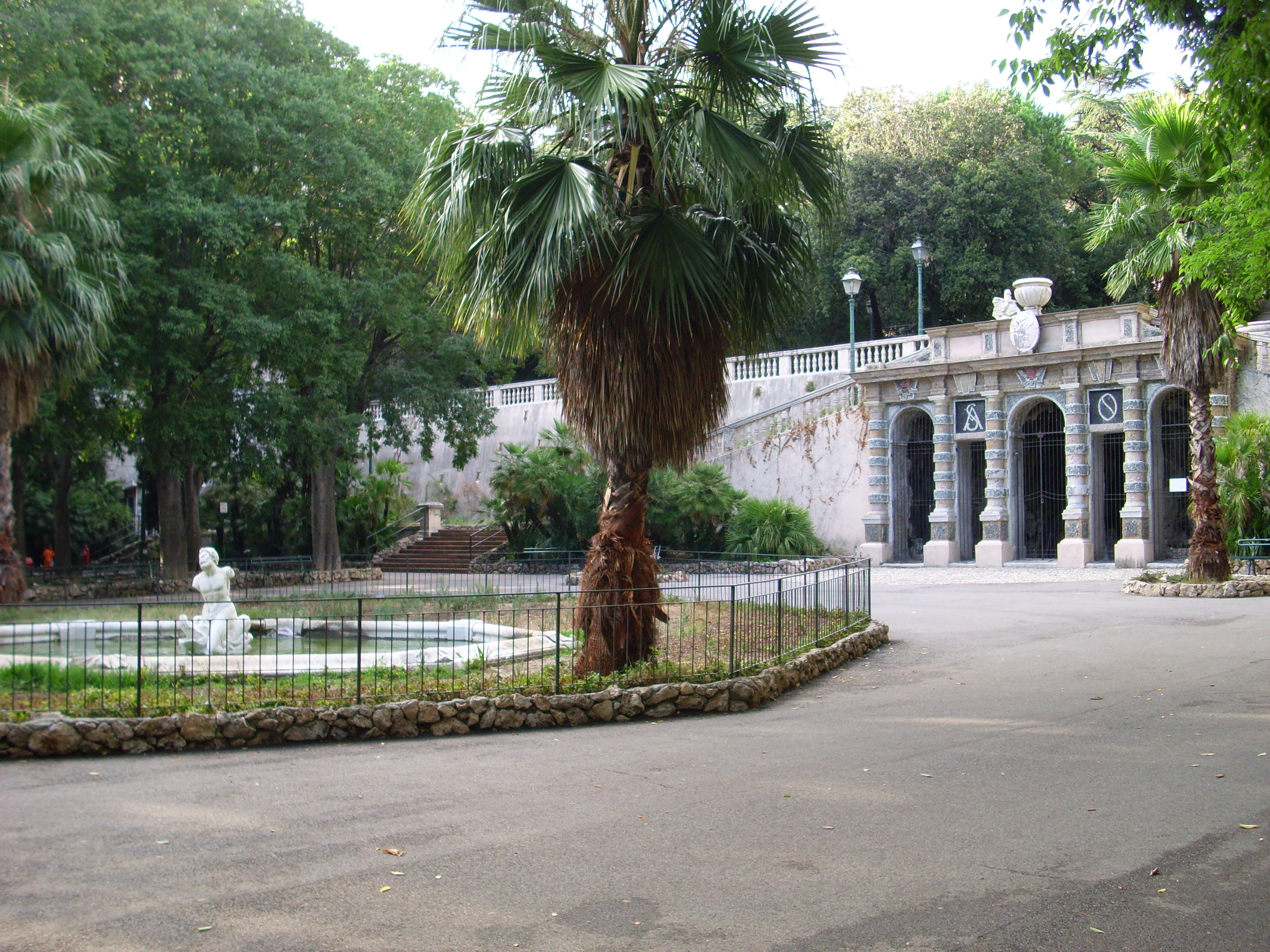
Villa Scassi park

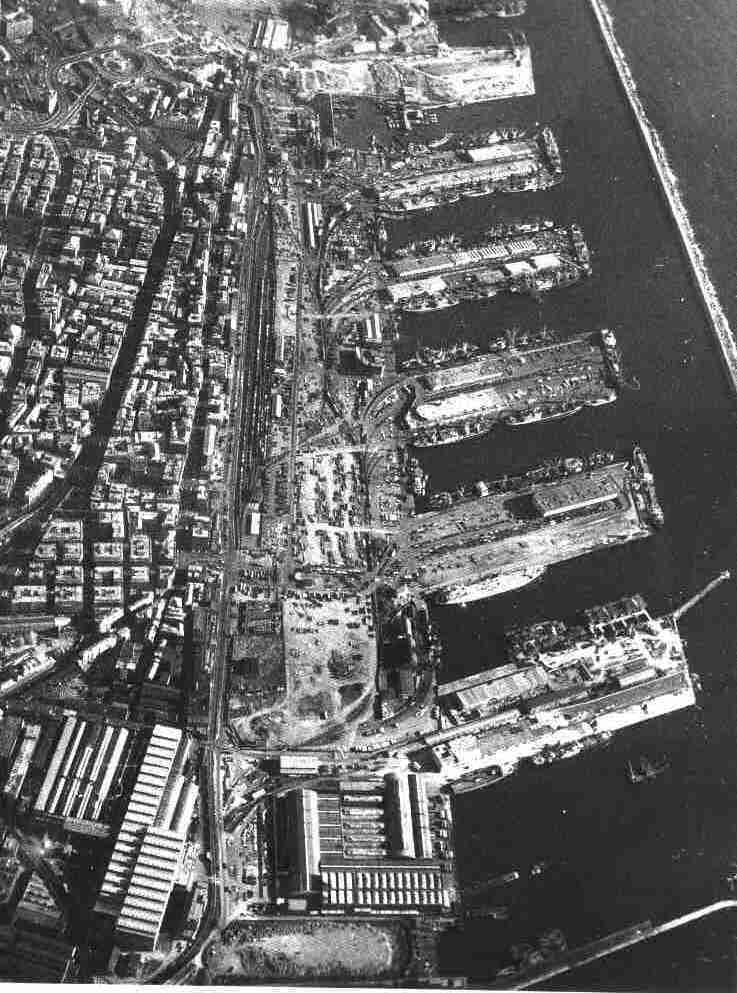
The port nears completion

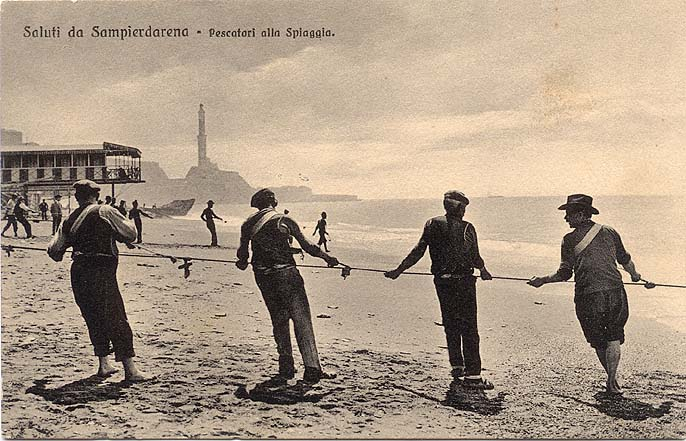
Old postcard of the beach

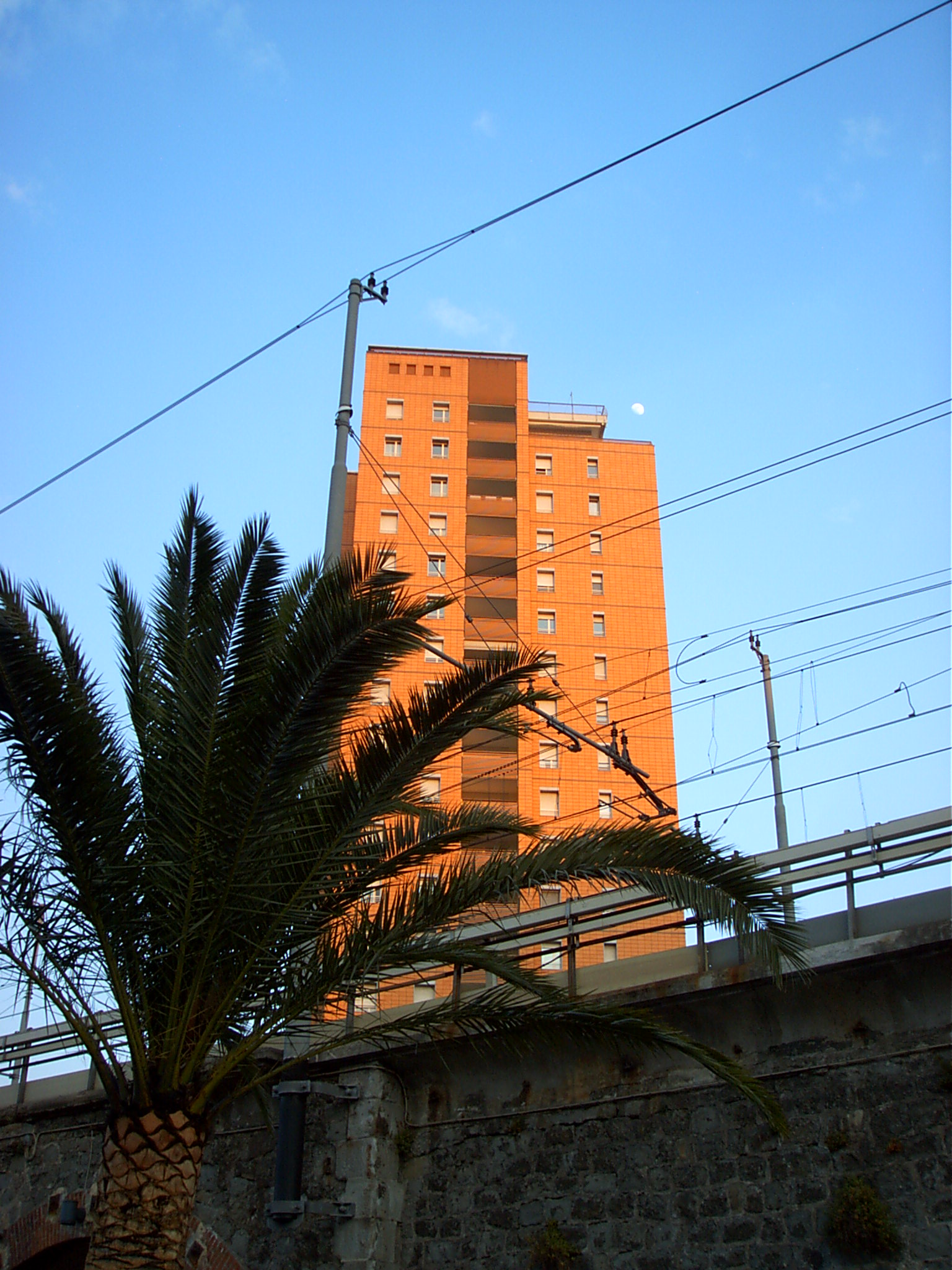
The Torre Sole in the Fiumara development

Sampierdarena or San Pier d'Arena (Ligurian: San Pê d'Ænn-a) is a major port and industrial area of Genoa, in northwest Italy. With San Teodoro it forms the Centro Ovest (West Central) municipio (borough).

== Geography ==
Sampierdarena lies on the coast about 4 kilometres (2 miles) west of the centre of Genoa. In 2017 the population was made of 43,463 inhabitants.

== History ==
Sampierdarena was an ancient fishing village, named after the church of San Pietro d'Arena ("St. Peter of the Sand"). During the Italian Renaissance it became a residential area, with great palaces being built such as the Palazzo Imperiale Scassi, designed by Domenico and Giovanni Ponzello according to the style of Galeazzo Alessi and for this reason believed in the past to be a work of Alessi himself and the Palazzo Spinola di San Pietro (whose designer is unknown), one of those drawn by the painter Peter Paul Rubens in the book Palazzi di Genova, published in Antwerp in 1622. After the coming of the railways (1854) it became one of the great industrial centres of Italy. Gio. Ansaldo & C. was one of the leading companies of the area involved in shipbuilding and armaments, building the first locomotive in Italy, named Sampierdarena, before it was finally taken over by Finmeccanica in 1993.

In 1926 the comune of Sampierdarena was absorbed by Greater Genoa, becoming in 1969 a delegazione, and in 1978 a circoscrizione of the city. At present it is part of the Genoa's city Municipio II (Centro Ovest), together with the neighbourhood of San Teodoro.

The Samp- in the name of Genoese football club U.C. Sampdoria (and the unique striped bands across the kit) derives from the local team Ginnastica Sampierdarenese, which merged with Società Andrea Doria in 1946.

== Economy ==
Historically the area was dominated by heavy industry such as shipbuilding.

== Architecture ==
=== Lighthouse ===
At the border to the San Teodoro district, there stands the symbol of Genoa, the lighthouse, the oldest still-working one in the world.

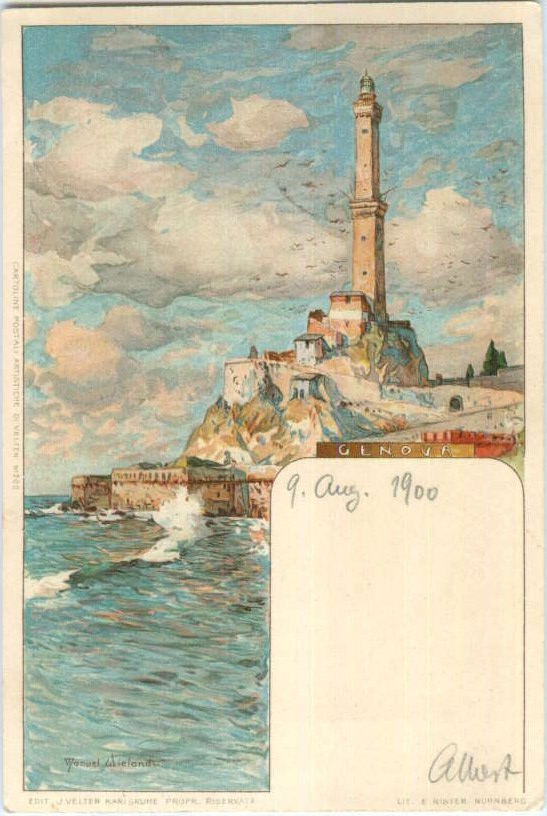
The lighthouse in 1900.

== See also ==
- Lighthouse of Genoa

Media related to Sampierdarena at Wikimedia Commons
