= Francesco Costa =

Italian painter (1672–1740)

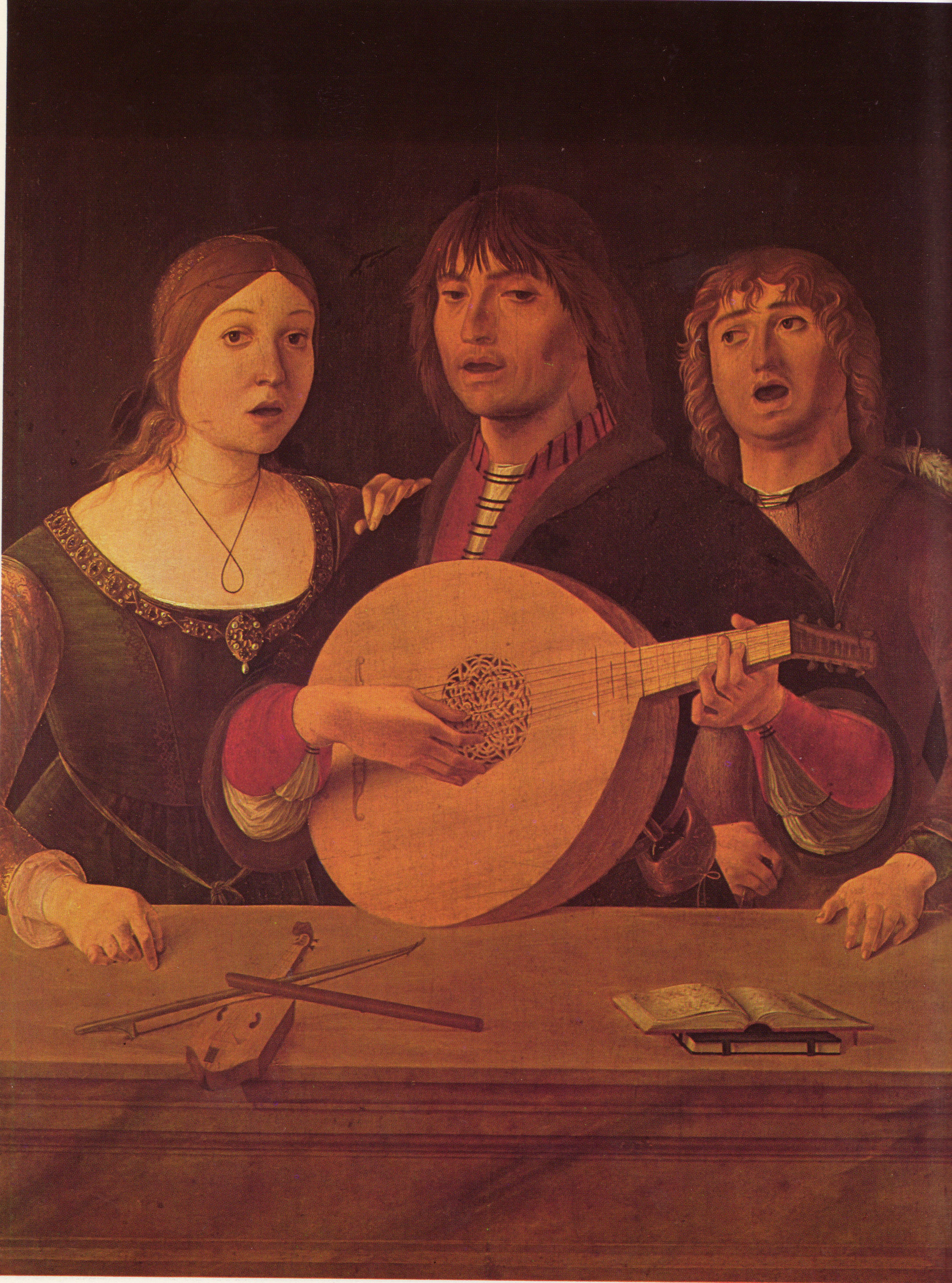
The Concert attributed to Costa

Francesco Costa (1672–1740) was an Italian painter of the late-Baroque period, active mainly in his native Genoa. He was the pupil of the painter Gregorio de Ferrari in Genoa, and later of Antonio Maria Haffner. He often painted with Giovanni Battista Revello (il Mustacchi). He painted in the Palazzo Grilli in Pegli, Genoa. He chiefly painted ornaments and quadratura. He painted Landscape with Rape of Europa which currently sits in the Uffizi museum.
