= San Sisto, Genoa =

Church building in Genoa, Italy

Coordinates: 44°24′50.67″N 8°55′34.75″E

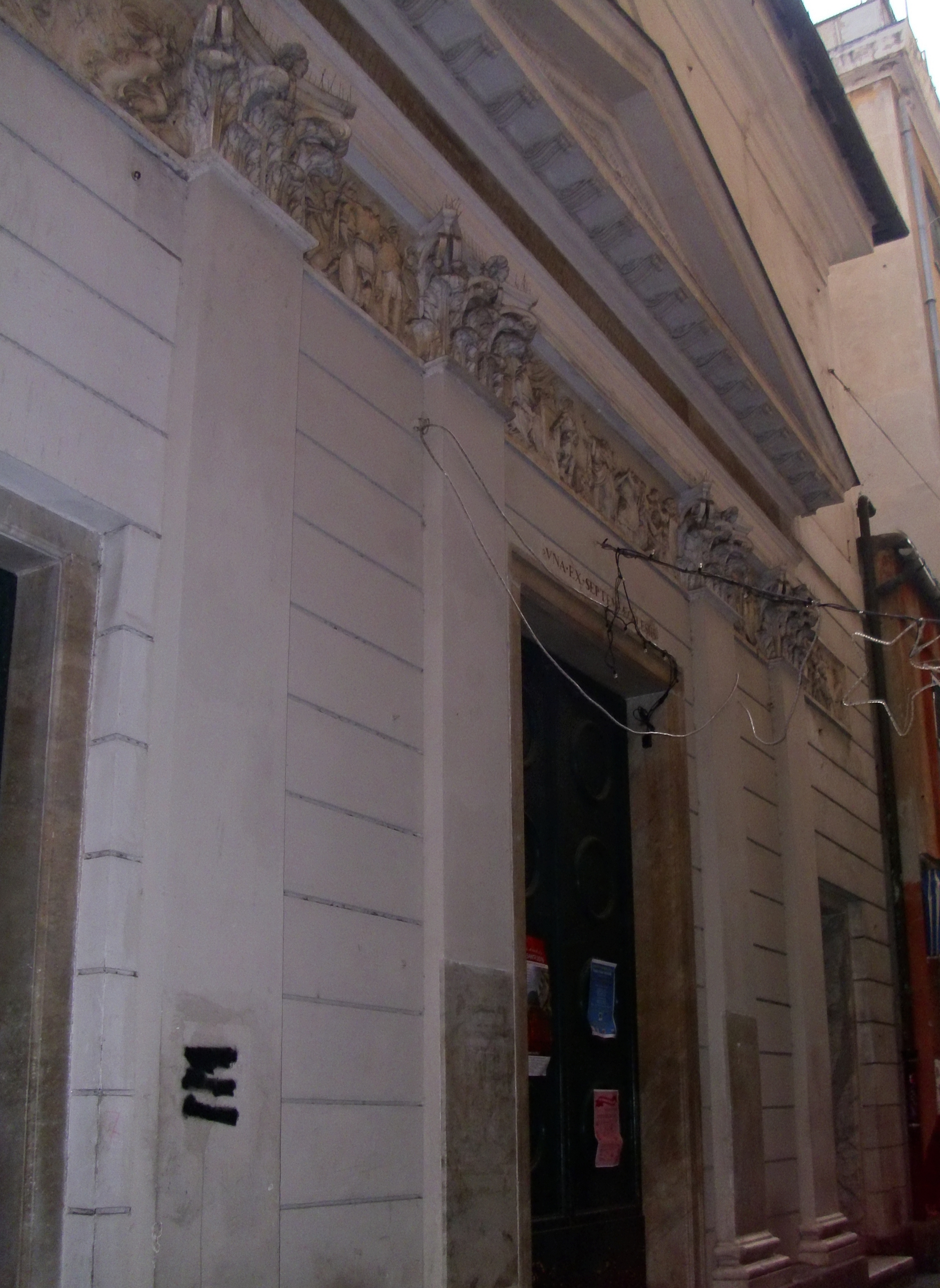
The facade of the church of San Sisto and the Nativity of the Holy Mary in Genoa, in the Prè district

San Sisto is a Roman Catholic church in Genoa, Italy, located in Centro-Est quartiere of Prè, near the railway station of Genova Piazza Principe.

== Background ==
A Romanesque church was built here from 1088 to 1093 to commemorate a victory on August 6, 1087, by the navies of Genoa and Pisa against a raiding Arab fleet; since Pope Sixtus II was honored on that date, the church was dedicated to him. The church belonged to the Benedictine Order of monks allied with Sacra di San Michele till 1479, except 1217–1241.

== Restored, Razed, Rebuilt ==
After a restoration in the 18th century, the church was completely razed and rebuilt in 1825, to make way for the road, now via Antonio Gramsci. Rebuilt in Neoclassicism style in 1827 by designs of Giovanni Battista Resasco and Pietro Pellegrini, the cupola was frescoed by Michel Cesare Danielli. The statue of San Sisto on the main altar was completed by Giovanni Battista Cevasco and donated to the church by the Marquis Ignazio Alessandro Pallavicini.

== Bibliography ==
- Paglieri, Nadia Pazzini & Paglieri, Rinangelo (1990). Chiese in Liguria. Genoa. ISBN 88-7058-361-9.
