= Pegli =

Pegli Pêgi
- Quartiere
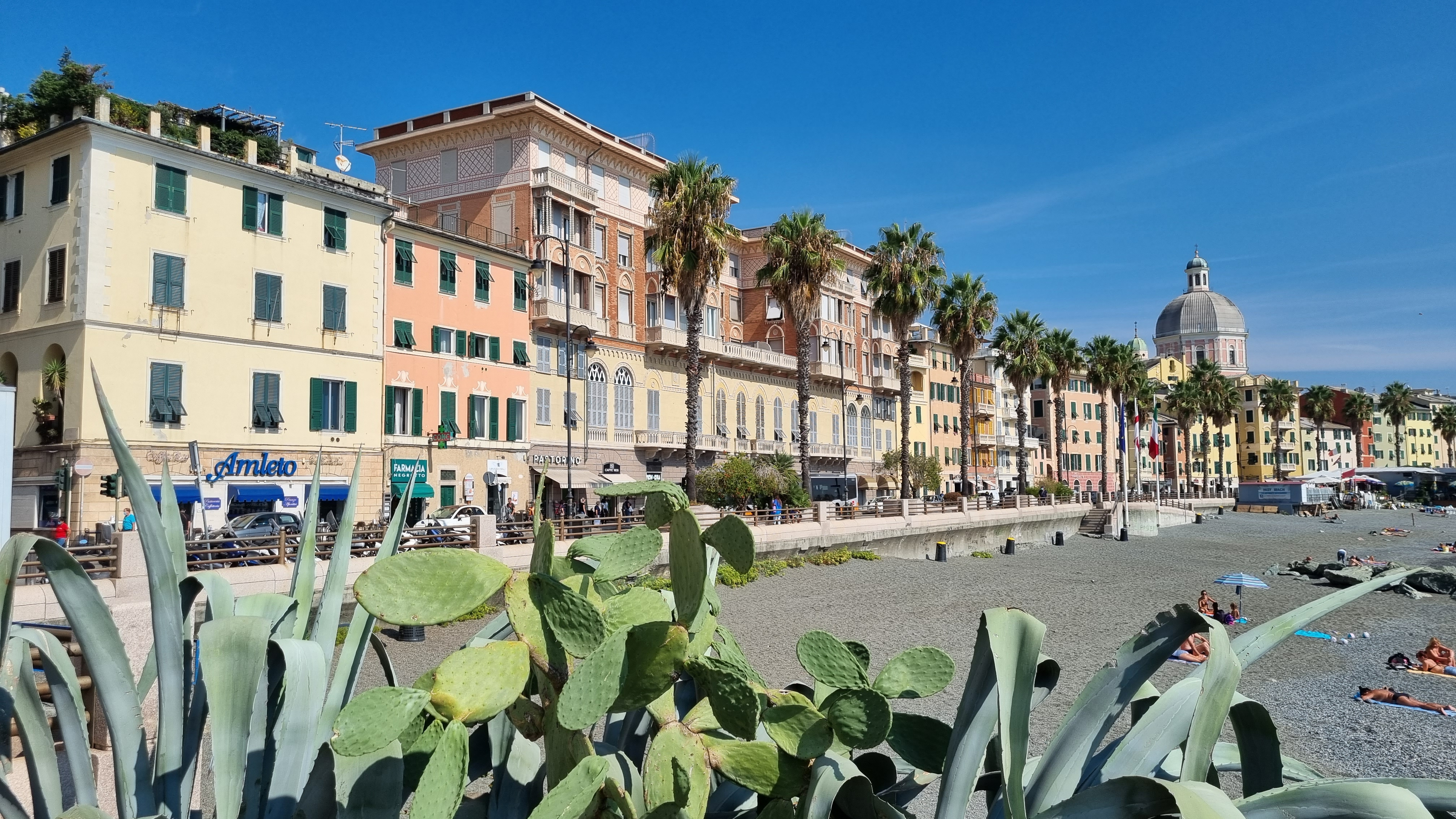
- Pegli - Lungomare centrale

- Coat of arms

- Location in Italy
- Coordinates: 44°25′31″N 8°48′52″E
- Country: Italy
- Region: Liguria
- Province: Province of Genoa
- Comune: Genoa

Pegli (Ligurian: Pêgi) is a neighbourhood in the west of Genoa, Italy. With other eighteen autonomous municipalities, in 1926 it ceased being independent and was merged into the municipality of Genoa.

With a mild climate and a promenade, Pegli is mainly a residential area with four public parks and several villas and mansions. It is also known as a tourist resort with some hotels, camping and bathing establishments. Many restaurants and shops characterize the town, which is connected to central Genoa by railway, water bus and bus.

== Notable residents ==
- Fabrizio De André - Italian singer and songwriter
- Renzo Piano - Italian architect
- Liliana Ross - Italian-born Chilean actress
- Alberto Lupo - Italian actor
- Gino Paoli - Italian recording artist

According to an oral tradition, on November 21, 1854, Giacomo Della Chiesa, later to become Pope Benedict XV, would have been born in Pegli, in the holiday palace of the Marquises Della Chiesa. In front of the palace, where he often stayed as a child and sometimes as an adult before his election to the papal throne, there is a small monument, whose inscription claims the birth of the future pope. However more reliable sources say he was born in the main family palace, in via di Santa Caterina, in the center of Genoa.
