= Giovanni Battista Revello =

Italian painter (1672–1732)

Giovanni Battista Revello (1672–1732), also called il Mustacchi, was an Italian Baroque painter. He painted both quadratura and still-life.

He was born in Recco near Genoa and studied under Enrico Haffner, and formed a close friendship with Francesco Costa. For twenty years they worked painting landscape elements for other historical painters.

Revello gained his nickname due to his unusual habit of painting moustaches on his works. He is said to have traveled to Tunisia to paint for the Bey. His son Paolo as also a painter (died in 1763).
