= Pierre-Edmé Babel =

French engraver (1719–1775)

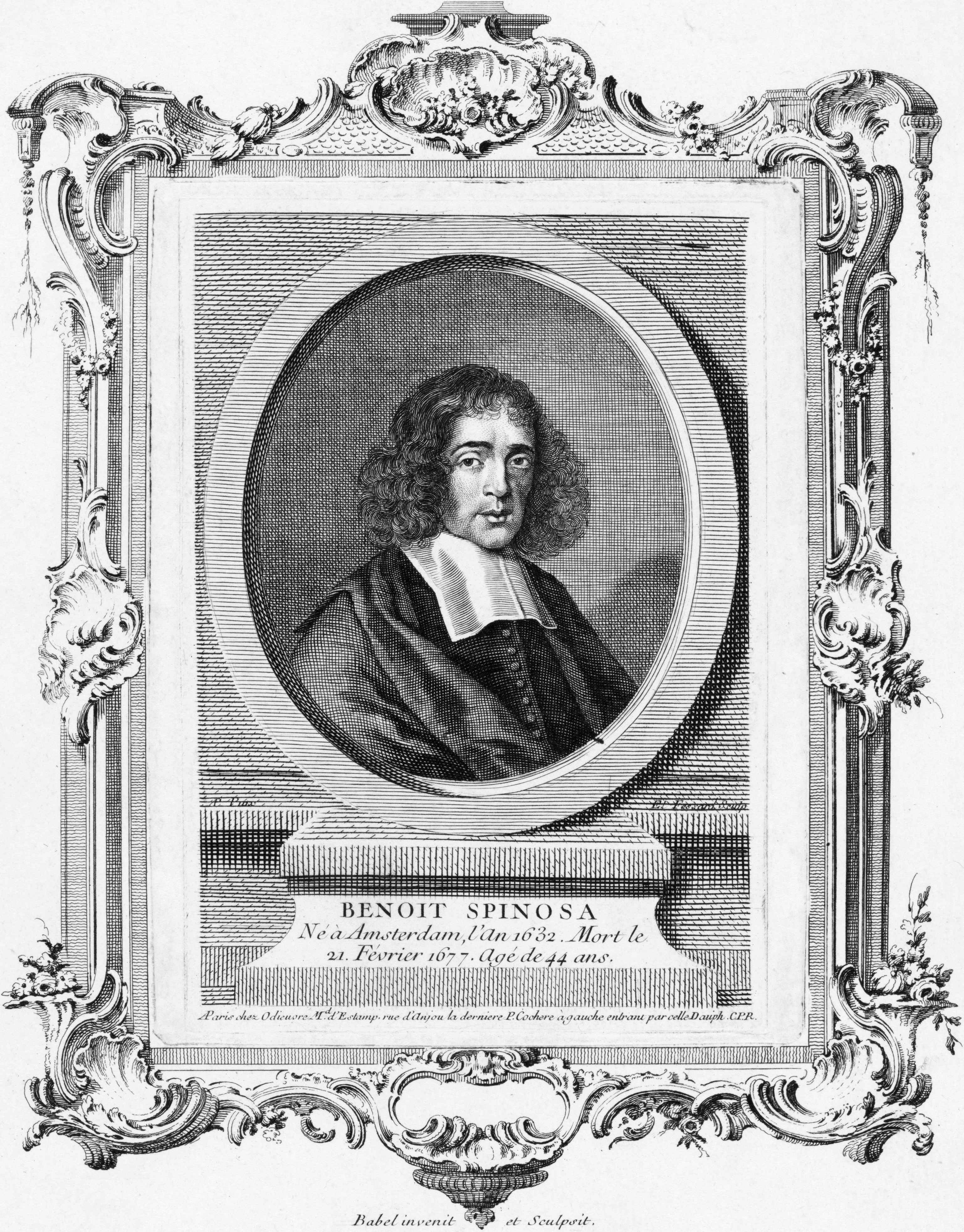
Benedictus de Spinoza (1632–1677). Engraving. Rijksmuseum Amsterdam, by Babel

Pierre-Edmé Babel (Paris, 11 November 1719 – Kehl, 26 October 1775) was a Parisian sculptor, draftsman, and etcher. Babel designed pieces for the Palace of Versailles, today they are seen in the Hall of Mirrors at the Palace. Works by Babel are held in the collection of the Cooper-Hewitt, National Design Museum, Metropolitan Museum of Art, Victoria and Albert Museum and the Harvard Art Museums.
