= Obaku Dokuryu =

Japanese calligrapher, scholar, monk and artist (1596–1672)

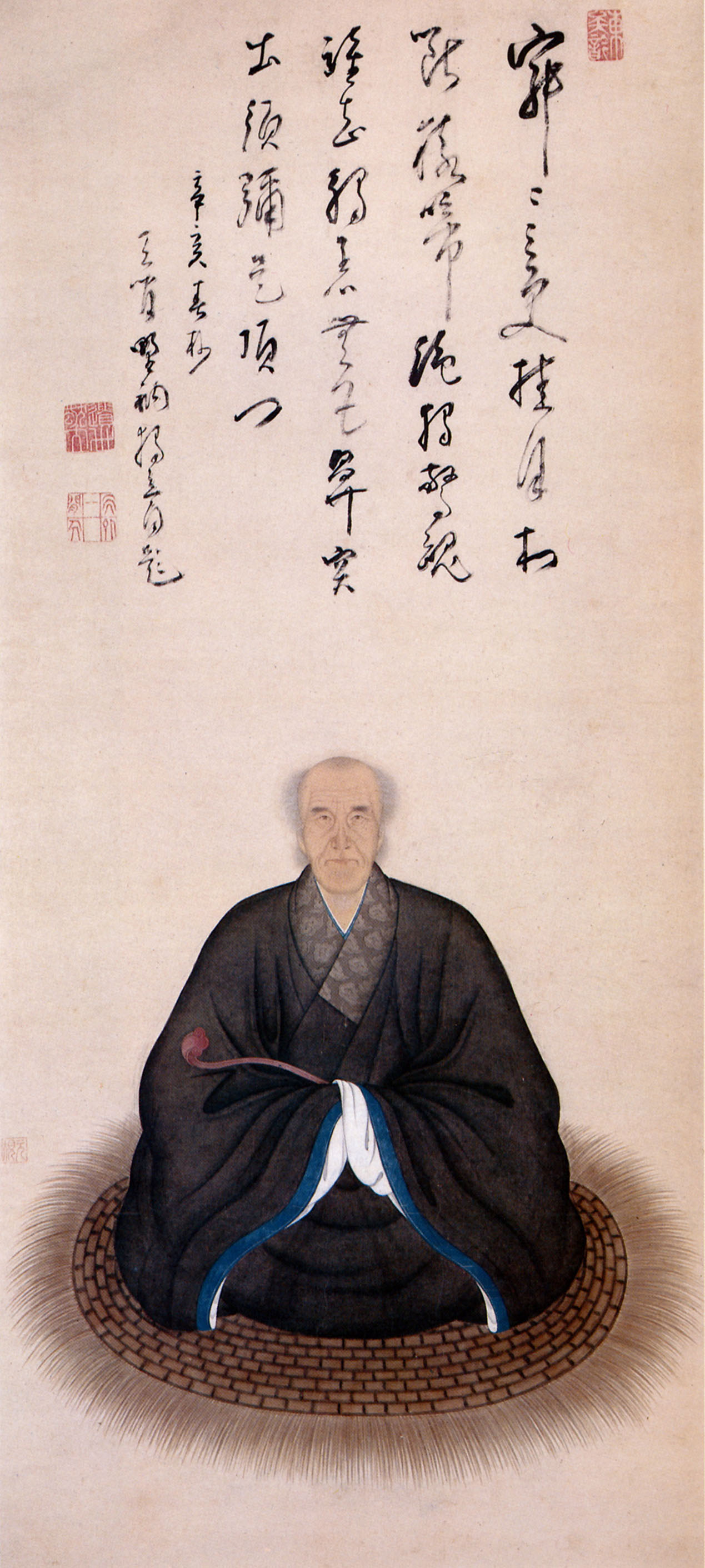
Portrait of Ōbaku Zen monk Dokuryū Shōeki of the early Edo period by Kita Genki, Cleveland Museum of Art

Obaku Dokuryu (1596–1672) was a Japanese calligrapher, scholar, monk and artist.

Dokuryu was born in China, but fled to Japan during the Manchu conquest resulting from the Seven Grievances. After settling at an Ōbaku Zen Temple and becoming a monk, he produced numerous works of calligraphy. He died in 1672. Some of his works can be seen at the Indianapolis Museum of Art.
