= Pietro Gaspari =

Italian painter

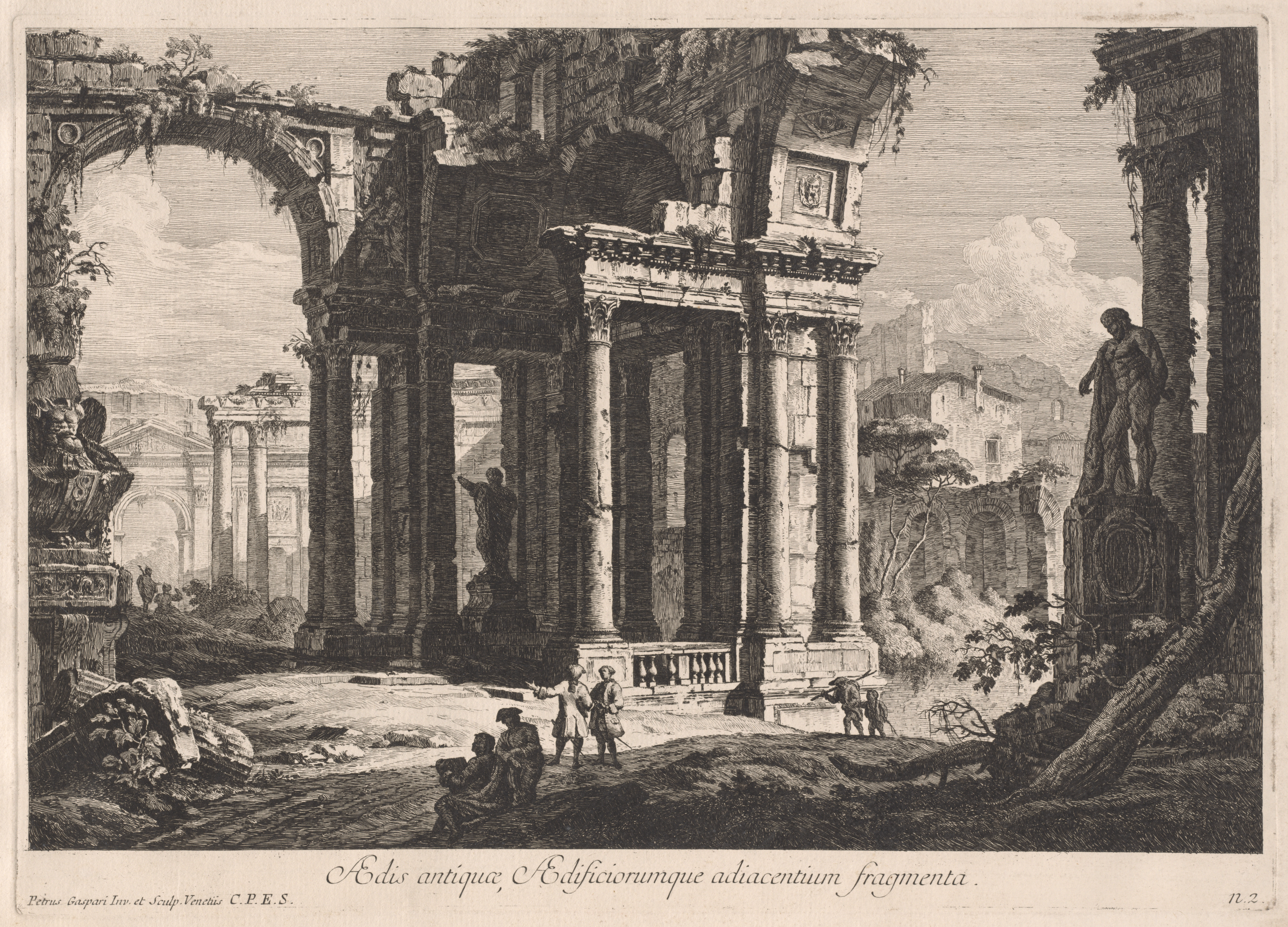
Ædis antiquæ, Ædificiorumque adiacentium fragmenta, 1771, etching with engraving

Pietro Gaspari (1720–1785) was an Italian artist, known for veduta and capriccio in etchings and paintings. Some of them resemble a more barren and finely detailed Piranesi. He worked for many years in Munich, Germany He was active mainly in Venice.
