= Anton Giuseppe Barbazza =

Italian painter and engraver

Anton Giuseppe Barbazza (c. 1720 – after 1771) was an Italian painter and engraver of the Baroque period. He was born in Rome, moved to Bologna, and in 1771 moved to Spain. In Rome, he had engraved the prints for Francesco Bianchini's L'istoria universale provata coi monumenti, published first in 1697 and reissued in 1747.

== Bibliography ==
- Ticozzi, Stefano (1830). Dizionario degli architetti, scultori, pittori, intagliatori in rame ed in pietra, coniatori di medaglie, musaicisti, niellatori, intarsiatori d'ogni etá e d'ogni nazione' (Volume 1). Milan: Gaetano Schiepatti. p. 108.
