= Alberto Carlieri =

Italian painter

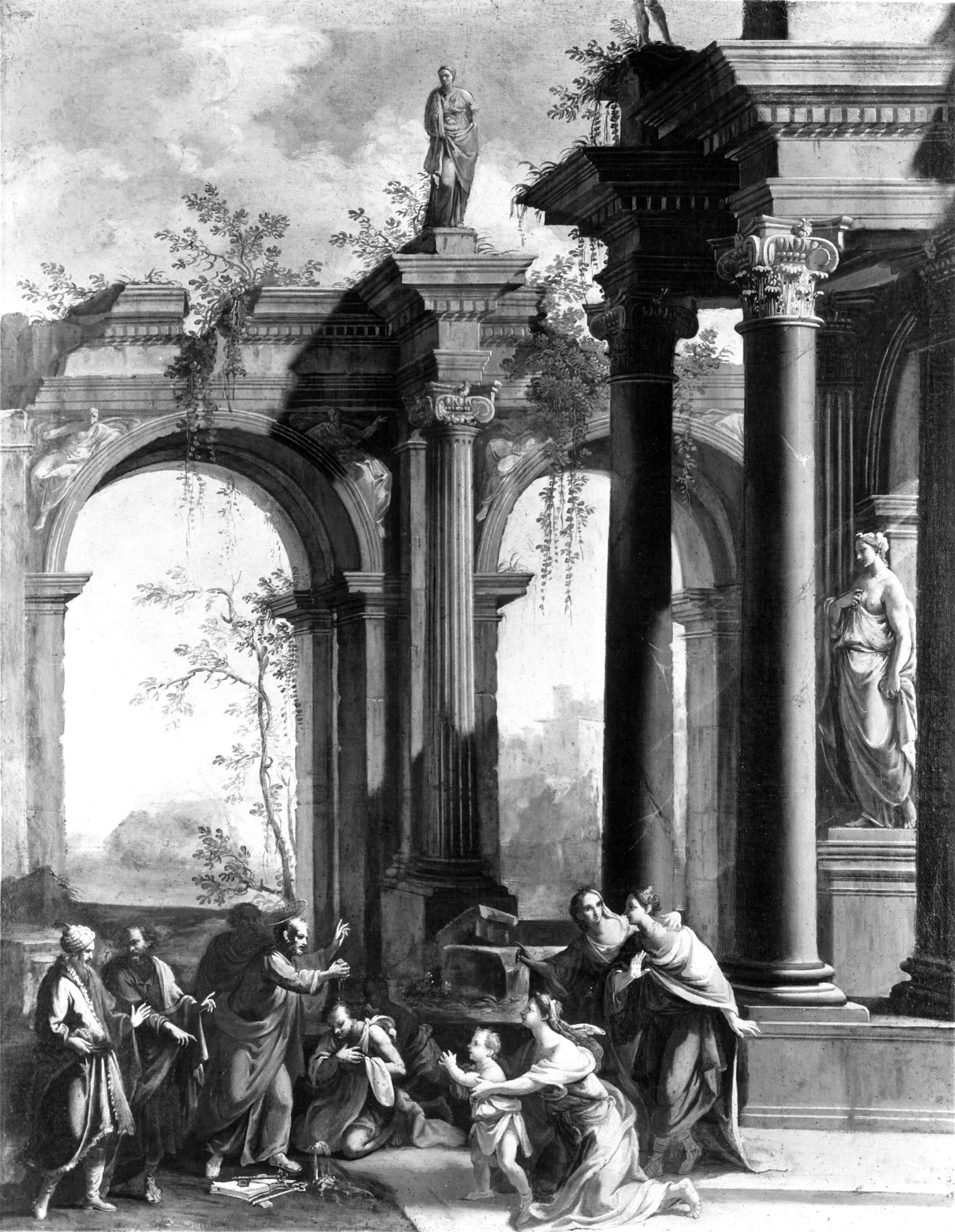
St. Peter Baptizing the Centurion, Cornelius, oil on canvas. In the collection of the Walters Art Museum.

Alberto Carlieri (1672-after 1720) was an Italian painter of the late-Baroque period. He was born at Rome, where he was first a pupil of Giuseppe Marchi, but afterwards of Andrea Pozzo. He excelled in painting quadratura.
